= List of United States Air Force missile squadrons =

This article lists the missile squadrons of the United States Air Force. There are nine missile squadrons currently active in the United States (listed in bold type); all nine are equipped to operate intercontinental ballistic missiles.

== Aerodynamic missile squadrons ==
**Aerodynamic Missile Squadrons**
Squadron	Emblem	Location	Weapons System	Active	Notes
1st Guided Missiles Squadron		Eglin AFB; Patrick AFB	Republic-Ford JB-2; VB-6 Felix; VB-3 Razon; VB-13 Tarzon	1946–1950	
1st Tactical Missile Squadron		Patrick AFB; Bitburg AB	B-61 (later TM-61) Matador, 1951–1958	1951–1958	Activated as **1st Pilotless Bomber Squadron**, first USAF operational tactical missile squadron. Replaced by 71st Tactical Missile Squadron
2d Guided Missiles Squadron		Holloman AFB; Patrick AFB	MM-3 Nike-Ajax; QB-17L Flying Fortress (Drone)	1949–1952	Evaluated/testing Nike-Ajax against QB-17L Drone testing. Re-designated 4802d Guided Missile Squadron 30 Dec 1950-14 May 1951 and moved to Patrick AFB. Re-designated 6555th Guided Missile Squadron, 14 May 1951 – 15 August 1959.
3d Guided Missiles Squadron		Patrick AFB; Holloman AFB	Consolidated-Vultee Lark	1950–1951	Evaluated/testing US Navy Lark SS Missile at Patrick AFB. Re-designated 4803d Guided Missile Squadron 30 Dec 1950 – 14 May 1951. Returned to Patrick AFB and re-designated 6556th Guided Missile Squadron, 14 May 1951 – 1 Mar 1953.
6th Air Defense Missile Squadron		Suffolk County AFB	CIM-10 Bomarc 1959–1964	1959–1964	
11th Tactical Missile Squadron		SEMBACH AB; RAF Greenham Common	TM-61 Matador, 1954–1958; BGM-109G 1981–1991	1954–1958; 1981–1991	Replaced by 822d Tactical Missile Squadron in 1958; Reactivated as a BGM-109G GLCM squadron during the 1980s, last to inactivate in 1991
17th Tactical Missile Squadron		Orlando AFB 1955–1957; Tainan AS 1957–1958	TM-61 Matador 1955–1958	1956–1958	Deployed to Taiwan, 1 May 1957, became operational in November. Re-designated as 868th Tactical Missile Squadron, June 1958
19th Tactical Missile Squadron		Orlando AFB 8–25 June 1956	TM-61 Matador 1956	1956	Inactivated after only 17 days, personnel were absorbed by the existing units at Orlando AFB, mainly the 17th TMS.
22d Air Defense Missile Squadron		Langley AFB	CIM-10 Bomarc 1959–1969	1959–1969	
24th Tactical Missile Squadron		Orlando AFB	MGM-1 Matador 1957–1958	1957–1958	Inactivated at Orlando AFB 1958, elements eventually joining 310th Tactical Missile Squadron at Osan AB, South Korea.
26th Air Defense Missile Squadron		Otis AFB	CIM-10 Bomarc 1959–1969	1959–1969	
30th Air Defense Missile Squadron		Dow AFB	CIM-10 Bomarc 1959–1964	1959–1964	
35th Air Defense Missile Squadron		Niagara Falls AFMS	CIM-10 Bomarc 1960–1969	1960–1969	
37th Air Defense Missile Squadron		Kincheloe AFB	CIM-10 Bomarc 1960–1972	1960–1972	Re-designated as the 37th Tactical Missile Squadron on 19 September 1985 while remaining inactive
41st Tactical Missile Squadron			Planned for BGM-109G		Re-designated in 1985 as a TMS. Never activated.
42d Tactical Missile Squadron			Planned for BGM-109G		Re-designated in 1985 as a TMS. Never activated.
46th Air Defense Missile Squadron		McGuire AFB	CIM-10 Bomarc 1959–1972	1959–1972	Both first and last operational BOMARC squadron. Re-designated as the 46th Tactical Missile Squadron on 19 September 1985 while remaining inactive.
69th Tactical Missile Squadron		Patrick AFB; Hahn AB	TM-61 Matador, 1952–1958	1952–1958	Activated as **69th Pilotless Bomber Squadron (Light)**. Replaced by 405th Tactical Missile Squadron.
71st Tactical Missile Squadron		Bitburg AB; Florennes AB	MGM-1 Matador, 1958–1962; MGM-13 Mace, 1962–1969; BGM-109G 1984–1989	1958–1969; 1984–1989	Operated three different types of Tactical missiles in USAFE. Was a B-57 Canberra Night Bombardment Squadron at Laon AB, France 1955–1958, converted to tactical missiles at Bitburg AB, 1958.
74th Air Defense Missile Squadron		Duluth AFMS	CIM-10 Bomarc 1960–1972	1960–1972	Re-designated as the 74th Tactical Missile Squadron on 19 September 1985 while remaining inactive.
87th Tactical Missile Squadron		RAF Molesworth	BGM-109G 1986–1989	1986–1989	
89th Tactical Missile Squadron		Hahn AB; Wueschheim AS	MGM-13 Mace, 1962–1966; BGM-109G 1985–1990	1962–1966; 1985–1990	
302d Tactical Missile Squadron		Comiso AB	BGM-109G 1983–1991	1983–1991	
310th Tactical Missile Squadron		Osan AB	MGM-1 Matador, 1958–1962	1958–1962	Missiles retained by host 58th Tactical Training Wing until inactivated December 1969
405th Tactical Missile Squadron		Hahn AB	MGM-1 Matador, 1958–1962; MGM-13 Mace, 1962–1966	1958–1966	Was a B-57 Canberra Night Bombardment Squadron at Laon AB, France 1955–1958, converted to tactical missiles at Hahn AB, 1958.
822d Tactical Missile Squadron		Sembach AB	TM-61 Matador, 1958–1960; MGM-13 Mace, 1961–1966	1958–1966	Was a B-57 Canberra Night Bombardment Squadron at Laon AB, France 1955–1958, converted to tactical missiles at Sembach AB, 1958.
823d Tactical Missile Squadron		Sembach AB	MGM-13 Mace, 1962–1966	1962–1966	
868th Tactical Missile Training Squadron		Tainan AS; Davis–Monthan AFB	TM-61 (later MGM-1) Matador 1958–1962; BGM-109G 1981–1990	1958–1962; 1981–1990	Stationed on Taiwan, 1958–1962 as 868th Tactical Missile Squadron. Reactivated in 1981 as BGM-109G cruise missile training unit
873d Tactical Missile Squadron		Kadena AB	MGM-13 Mace, 1961–1965	1961–1965	Missile operations were conducted directly by the parent 498th Tactical Missile Group after the squadron's inactivation, 8 July 1965 – 31 December 1969.
874th Tactical Missile Squadron		Kadena AB	MGM-13 Mace, 1961–1965	1961–1965	Missile operations were conducted directly by the parent 498th Tactical Missile Group after the squadron's inactivation, 8 July 1965 – 31 December 1969.
887th Tactical Missile Squadron		Sembach AB	MGM-13 Mace, 1962–1966	1962–1966	
4751st Air Defense Missile Squadron		Eglin AFB Aux #9	CIM-10 Bomarc 1959–1979	1959–1979	BOMARC Testing/Evaluation/Training Unit

== Ballistic missile squadrons ==
**Ballistic Missile Squadrons**
Squadron	Emblem	Location	Weapons System	Active	Notes
**10th Missile Squadron**		Malmstrom AFB	LGM-30A/B Minuteman I, 1962–1968; LGM-30F Minuteman II, 1968–1991; LGM-30G Minuteman III, 1996–present	1962–present	341st SMW/OG "First Ace in the Hole"; B-47 squadron, 1956–1961
**12th Missile Squadron**		Malmstrom AFB	LGM-30A/B Minuteman I, 1962–1968; LGM-30F Minuteman II, 1968–1991; LGM-30G Minuteman III, 1996–present	1962–present	341st SMW/OG "Red Dawgs"; B-47 squadron, 1956–1961
66th Missile Squadron		Ellsworth AFB	LGM-30B Minuteman I, 1963–1973; LGM-30F Minuteman II, 1972–1993	1963–1993	44th SMW/OG "The Peace Keepers"; B-47 squadron, 1953–1960
67th Missile Squadron		Ellsworth AFB	LGM-30B Minuteman I, 1963–1973; LGM-30F Minuteman II, 1972–1992	1963–1992	44th SMW/OG "The people rule"; B-47 squadron, 1953–1960
68th Missile Squadron		Ellsworth AFB	LGM-30B Minuteman I, 1963–1973; LGM-30F Minuteman II, 1972–1994	1963–1994	44th SMW/OG; B-47 squadron, 1953–1960
**319th Missile Squadron**		F.E. Warren AFB	LGM-30B Minuteman I 1964–1974; LGM-30G Minuteman III 1973–present	1964–present	90th SMW/OG "Screamin' Eagles"; RB-47 strategic reconnaissance squadron, 1954–1960
**320th Missile Squadron**		F.E. Warren AFB	LGM-30B Minuteman I 1964–1974; LGM-30G Minuteman III 1973–present	1964–present	90th SMW/OG "Naked Indians"; RB-47 strategic reconnaissance squadron, 1954–1960
**321st Missile Squadron**		F.E. Warren AFB	LGM-30B Minuteman I 1964–1974; LGM-30G Minuteman III 1973–present	1964–present	90th SMW/OG "Frontier Warriors"; RB-47 strategic reconnaissance squadron, 1954–1960
373d Strategic Missile Squadron		Little Rock AFB	LGM-25C Titan II 1962–1987	1962–1987	308th SMW; B-47 squadron, 1954–1959
374th Strategic Missile Squadron		Little Rock AFB	LGM-25C Titan II 1962–1987	1962–1987	308th SMW; B-47 squadron, 1954–1959
400th Missile Squadron		F.E. Warren AFB	LGM-30B Minuteman I, 1964–1974; LGM-30G Minuteman III, 1973–1987; LGM-118A Peacekeeper, 1987–2005	1964–2005	90th SMW/OG Only LGM-118A Peacekeeper squadron. With the deployment of the LGM-118A, 50 former Minuteman III silos were converted. Flights P through T were reassigned to the Peacekeeper for operational duty.
446th Missile Squadron		Grand Forks AFB	LGM-30F Minuteman II, 1965–1973; LGM-30G Minuteman III, 1972–1998	1965–1998	321st SMW/MG; B-47 squadron, 1953–1961
447th Missile Squadron		Grand Forks AFB	LGM-30F Minuteman II, 1965–1973; LGM-30G Minuteman III, 1972–1998	1965–1998	321st SMW/MG; B-47 squadron, 1953–1961
448th Missile Squadron		Grand Forks AFB	LGM-30F Minuteman II, 1965–1973; LGM-30G Minuteman III, 1972–1998	1965–1998	321st SMW/MG; B-47 squadron, 1953–1961
**490th Missile Squadron**		Malmstrom AFB	LGM-30A/B Minuteman I, 1962–1968; LGM-30F Minuteman II, 1968–1991; LGM-30G Minuteman III, 1996–present	1962–present	341st SMW/OG; B-47 squadron, 1956–1961 "Farsiders"
508th Missile Squadron		Whiteman AFB	LGM-30B Minuteman I, 1963–1967; LGM-30F Minuteman II, 1966–1995	1963–1995	351st SMW/OG
509th Missile Squadron		Whiteman AFB	LGM-30B Minuteman I, 1963–1967; LGM-30F Minuteman II, 1966–1994	1963–1994	351st SMW/OG
510th Missile Squadron		Whiteman AFB	LGM-30B Minuteman I, 1963–1967; LGM-30F Minuteman II, 1966–1995	1963–1995	351st SMW/OG Emergency Rocket Communications System (1967–1995)
532d Strategic Missile Squadron		McConnell AFB	LGM-25C Titan II, 1962–1986	1962–1986	381st SMW
533d Strategic Missile Squadron		McConnell AFB	LGM-25C Titan II, 1962–1986	1962–1986	381st SMW
548th Strategic Missile Squadron		Forbes AFB	SM-65E Atlas, 1960–1964	1960–1964	40th SAW
549th Strategic Missile Squadron		Offut AFB	SM-65D Atlas, 1961–1964	1961–1964	385th SAW
550th Strategic Missile Squadron		Schilling AFB	SM-65F Atlas, 1961–1965	1961–1965	310th SAW
551st Strategic Missile Squadron		Lincoln AFB	SM-65F Atlas, 1961–1965	1961–1965	98th SAW
556th Strategic Missile Squadron		Presque Isle AFB, 9–16 Jul 1959; Plattsburgh AFB 1961–1965	SM-62 Snark, 1958–1959; SM-65F Atlas, 1962–1965	1958–1959; 1962–1965	702d SAW (1959); 820th SAD (1961–1965) Only operational SM-62 Snark aerodynamic intercontinental missile squadron; only Atlas (or any other) ICBM squadron east of the Mississippi River.
564th Missile Squadron		F.E. Warren AFB 1958–1964; Malmstrom AFB 1966–2008	SM-65D Atlas, 1960–1964; LGM-30F Minuteman II, 1967–1975; LGM-30G Minuteman III, 1975–2008	1958–2008	706th SMW (1958–1961); 389th SMW (1961–1964); 341st SMW/OG (1966–2008) 564th Strategic Missile Squadron was the first ICBM operational squadron activated (1 May 1958).
565th Strategic Missile Squadron		F.E. Warren AFB	SM-65D Atlas, 1958–1965	1958–1965	706th SMW (1958–1961); 389th SMW (1961–1965)
566th Strategic Missile Squadron		F.E. Warren AFB	SM-65E Atlas, 1961–1965	1959–1965	389th SMW (1961–1965)
567th Strategic Missile Squadron		Fairchild AFB	SM-65E Atlas, 1960–1965	1960–1965	92d SAW
568th Strategic Missile Squadron		Larson AFB	SM-68 Titan I 1961–1965	1961–1965	462d SAW
569th Strategic Missile Squadron		Mountain Home AFB	SM-68 Titan I 1962–1964	1961–1964	9th SAW
570th Strategic Missile Squadron		Davis–Monthan AFB	LGM-25C Titan II, 1962–1984	1962–1984	390th SMW
571st Strategic Missile Squadron		Davis–Monthan AFB	LGM-25C Titan II, 1962–1984	1962–1984	390th SMW
576th Strategic Missile Squadron		Cooke (later, Vandenberg) AFB	SM-65D/E/F Atlas, 1958–1966	1958–1966	704th SMW (1958), 1st SAD (1959–1966), first SM-65D Atlas squadron put on alert, 1958. Operated Atlas-D/E/F until 1966 Today, current 576th Test Squadron tested LGM-118 Peacekeeper, 1991–2004 and LGM-30G Minuteman III, 1991–present.
577th Strategic Missile Squadron		Altus AFB	SM-65F Atlas, 1961–1965	1961–1965	11th SAW
578th Strategic Missile Squadron		Dyess AFB	SM-65F Atlas, 1961–1965	1961–1965	96th SAW
579th Strategic Missile Squadron		Walker AFB	SM-65F Atlas, 1962–1965	1962–1965	6th SAW
644th Strategic Missile Squadron		Vandenberg AFB	PGM-17 Thor, 1959; HGM-25A Titan I 1959; SM-65 Atlas, 1959	1959	Short-lived Missile Training squadron at Vandenberg AFB. Provided training for Royal Air Force personnel in the operation and launching of the PGM-17 Thor Intermediate-Range Missie. Also provided training to SAC personnel on SM-65 Atlas and HGM-25A Titan I Intercontinental Ballistic Missiles. Later became a B-52H Stratofortress bombardment squadron.
672d Strategic Missile Squadron		RAF Feltwell; RAF Lakenheath	PGM-17 Thor, 1958–1959	1958–1959	Short-lived Missile Training squadron in the UK for RAF Thor missile crews.
724th Strategic Missile Squadron		Lowry AFB	HGM-25A Titan I, 1961–1965	1961–1965	Former 848th Strategic Missile Squadron (1960–1961), never manned or equipped. 703d SMW/451st SMW
725th Strategic Missile Squadron		Lowry AFB	HGM-25A Titan I, 1961–1965	1961–1965	Former 849th Strategic Missile Squadron (1960–1961), never manned or equipped. 703d SMW/451st SMW
**740th Missile Squadron**		Minot AFB	LGM-30 Minuteman I, 1963–1971; LGM-30 Minuteman III, 1968–present	1963–present	455th SMW/91st SMW/OG "Vulgar Vultures"
**741st Missile Squadron**		Minot AFB	LGM-30 Minuteman I, 1963–1971; LGM-30 Minuteman III, 1968–present	1963–present	455th SMW/91st SMW/OG "Gravel Haulers"
**742d Missile Squadron**		Minot AFB	LGM-30 Minuteman I, 1963–1971; LGM-30 Minuteman III, 1968–present	1963–present	455th SMW/91st SMW/OG "The Wolfpack"
850th Strategic Missile Squadron		Ellsworth AFB	HGM-25A Titan I, 1960–1965	1960–1965	44th SMW
851st Strategic Missile Squadron		Beale AFB	HGM-25A Titan I, 1962–1965	1962–1965	456th SAW
864th Strategic Missile Squadron		Redstone Arsenal	PGM-19 Jupiter, 1958–1960	1958–1960	Provided training for Italian Air Force personnel in the operation and launching of the PGM-19 Jupiter
865th Strategic Missile Squadron		Redstone Arsenal	PGM-19 Jupiter, 1958–1959	1958–1959	Provided training for Italian Air Force personnel in the operation and launching of the PGM-19 Jupiter
866th Strategic Missile Squadron		Redstone Arsenal	PGM-19 Jupiter, 1958–1962	1958–1962	Provided training for Turkish Air Force personnel in the operation and launching of the PGM-19 Jupiter

== See also ==
- 6555th Aerospace Test Group
- List of United States Air Force squadrons
