= Si Spiegel =

American bomber pilot and artificial christmas tree manufacturer (1924–2024)

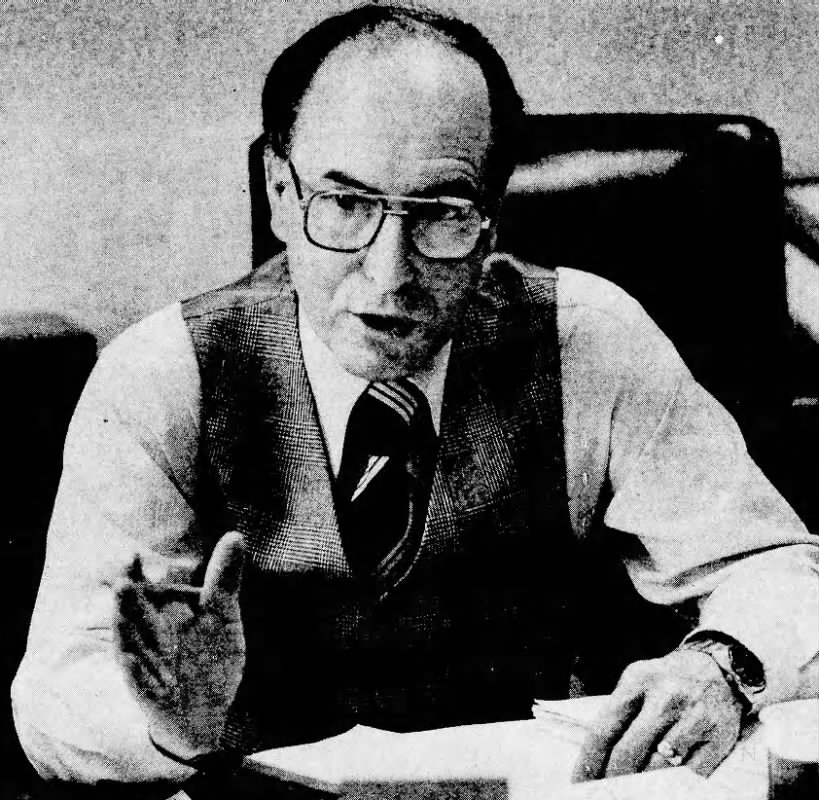
- Spiegel in 1978
- Born: Si Herbert Spiegel; May 28, 1924; Manhattan, New York, U.S.
- Died: January 21, 2024 (aged 99); New York City, U.S.
- Military career
- Allegiance: United States
- Branch: United States Army Air Corps; Eighth Air Force
- Rank: First lieutenant
- Units: 490th Bombardment Group; 849th Strategic Missile Squadron
- Conflicts: World War II

Si Herbert Spiegel (May 28, 1924 – January 21, 2024) was an American bomber pilot and artificial christmas tree manufacturer.

== Life and career ==
Spiegel was born in Manhattan, New York, the son of David Spiegel and Massia Perlman. He attended Textile High School, graduating in 1942. After graduating, he enlisted and served in the United States Army. He was a bomber pilot during World War II.

After World War II ended, Spiegel worked as a radio announcer in New Mexico. He then was president of the American Tree & Wreath Company. In 1993, he retired his position as president and sold his business.

== Death ==
Spigel died on January 21, 2024, in New York City, at the age of 99.
