= 13th Strategic Missile Division =

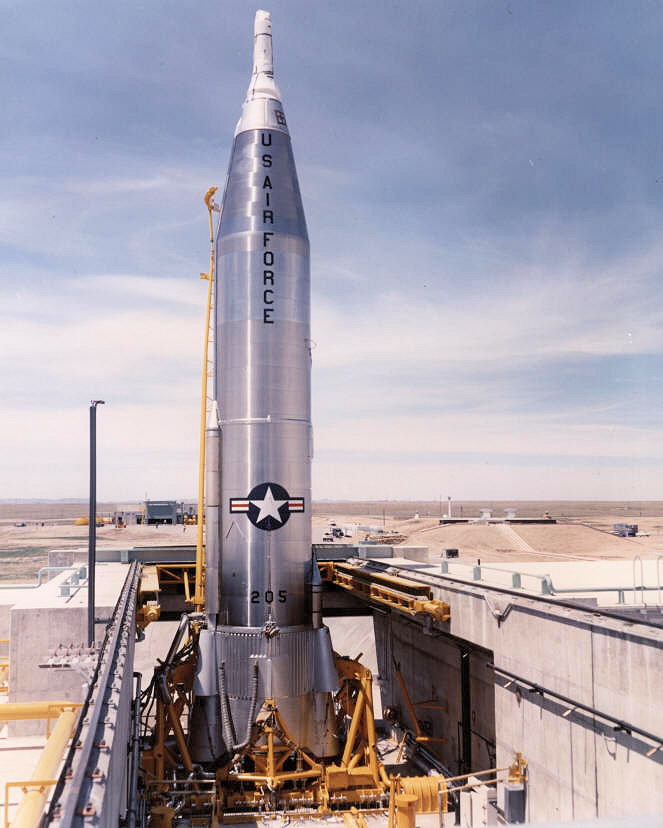
- 564th Strategic Missile Squadron Convair SM-65D Atlas
- Active: 1940–1966
- Country: United States
- Branch: United States Air Force
- Role: Strategic Missile Command and Control
- Engagements: World War II EAME Theater

Insignia
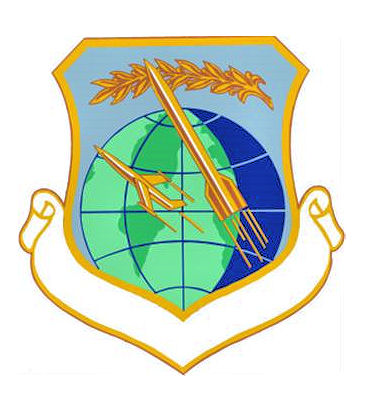
- 13th Strategic Missile Division emblem (approved 4 January 1961)

The 13th Strategic Missile Division is an inactive United States Air Force unit. Its last assignment was with Fifteenth Air Force, based at Francis E. Warren Air Force Base, Wyoming. It was inactivated on 2 July 1966.

Initially formed in 1940 as an air defense formation in the Caribbean, it later commanded Boeing B-17 Flying Fortress groups of Eighth Air Force in the United Kingdom. Its units carried out strategic bombardment missions over Occupied Europe and Nazi Germany. During the Cold War, the division controlling early ICBM wings of Strategic Air Command in the Midwest.

== History ==
The unit was initially organized at Langley Field, Virginia, as the 13th Composite Wing in October 1940. It was assigned to the new Caribbean Air Force as a command organization for units in the Caribbean.

Assigned to Borinquen Field, Puerto Rico, its mission was to provide an air strike force for the defense of Puerto Rico and the U.S. Virgin Islands. During the period 1940 to 1942, the wing controlled 21 Douglas B-18 Bolo medium bombers and 92 assorted fighters in about a dozen groups and squadrons. On 17 April 1942, the wing was inactivated, and its mission was taken over by the VI Interceptor Command, Antilles Air Task Force.

The organization was reactivated as the 13th Bombardment Wing in October 1942 at MacDill Field, Florida under Third Air Force. It was one of three bombardment wing headquarters (12th, 13th, 14th) which were formed at MacDill for deployment to Eighth Air Force in England. The 13th deployed in June 1943. There, it controlled the 95th, 100th and 390th Bombardment Groups under the 3d Bombardment Division, flying Boeing B-17 Flying Fortresses. Controlling the combat operations of the groups, it carried out strategic bombing of enemy aircraft, petroleum, and ball bearing industries as well as German airfields. Later, organizational units took part in the famous raid against the ball bearing industry at Schweinfurt in October 1943 and followed with missions against shipyards and shipbuilding installations at Wilhelmshaven and Bremen. With the end of the war in Europe, it returned to the United States and was inactivated on 17 October 1945.

The wing was redesignated as the 13th Air Division and then activated under Strategic Air Command (SAC) in July 1959. The 13th was one of SAC's first strategic missile command organizations, initially being assigned the 703d and 706th Strategic Missile Wings at Lowry AFB, Colorado with the new SM-68 Titan I ICBM. However, these wings never became operational; instead the division became an SM-65 Atlas organization, controlling the 389th and 451st Strategic Missile Wings. In 1963, it assumed command of the 90th Strategic Missile Wing with the new LGM-30A Minuteman I.

In 1965, the first-generation Atlas intercontinental ballistic missile was taken off alert and its subordinate wings were inactivated. It was briefly assigned some KC-135A Tankers and EC-135 electronic intelligence aircraft after the 98th Bombardment Wing was inactivated at Lincoln Air Force Base, Nebraska afterwards, however the 13th Strategic Missile Division was itself inactivated in July 1966, its mission being taken over by the 821st Strategic Aerospace Division in a SAC reorganization.

=== Lineage ===
- Established as the 13th Composite Wing on 2 October 1940

Activated on 10 October 1940
Inactivated on 17 April 1942

- Redesignated: 13th Bombardment Wing on 23 August 1942

Activated on 1 October 1942
Redesignated 13th Bombardment Wing (Heavy) on 1 February 1943
Redesignated 13th Combat Bombardment Wing (Heavy) on 30 August 1943
Redesignated 13th Combat Bombardment Wing, Heavy on 24 August 1944
Redesignated 13th Bombardment Wing, Heavy on 18 June 1945
Redesignated 13th Bombardment Wing, Very Heavy on 17 August 1945
Inactivated on 17 October 1945

- Redesignated 13th Air Division on 20 May 1959

Activated on 1 July 1959
Redesignated 13th Strategic Missile Division on 1 January 1963
Discontinued and inactivated, on 2 July 1966

=== Assignments ===
- Unknown, 10 October 1940
- Panama Canal Air Force (later Caribbean Air Force), c. 1 November 1940 – 25 October 1941
- Third Air Force, 1 October 1942
- Eighth Air Force, c. 1 June 1943
- VIII Bomber Command, 4 June 1943
- 3d Air Division, 16 July 1945
- Second Air Force, c. 15 August 1945 – 17 October 1945
- Fifteenth Air Force, 1 July 1959
- Eighth Air Force, 1 July 1963
- Fifteenth Air Force, 1 July 1965 – 2 July 1966

=== Components ===
Wings

HGM-25A Titan I ICBM

- 703d Strategic Missile Wing: 1 July 1959 – 1 July 1961
- 706th Strategic Missile Wing: 1 July 1959 – 1 July 1961

SM-65A Atlas ICBM

- 389th Strategic Missile Wing: 1 July 1961 – 25 March 1965
- 451st Strategic Missile Wing: 1 July 1961 – 25 June 1965

LGM-30A Minuteman I ICBM

- 90th Strategic Missile Wing: 1 July 1963 – 2 July 1966

Squadron

- 34th Air Refueling Squadron: 1 July 1965 – 25 June 1966.

Groups

- 25th Bombardment Group: 1 November 1940 – c. 6 January 1941
- 36th Pursuit Group: January-3 June 1941
- 40th Bombardment Group: 1 May – 25 October 1941
- 95th Bombardment Group: September 1943 – c. 19 June 1945
- 100th Bombardment Group: c. September 1943 – c. December 1945
- 390th Bombardment Group: 13 September 1943 – c. 4 August 1945
- 490th Bombardment Group: c. March – August 1945
- 493d Bombardment Group: c. March – August 1945

=== Stations ===
- Langley Field, Virginia, 10 – 26 October 1940
- Borinquen Field, Puerto Rico, 1 November 1940
- San Juan, Puerto Rico, c. 6 January 1941
- Borinquen Field, Puerto Rico, c. 1 May – 25 October 1941
- MacDill Field, Florida, 1 October 1942 – c. 10 May 1943
- Marks Hall, England, c. 2 June 1943
- Camp Blainey, England, c. 13 June 1943
- RAF Horham, England, 13 September 1943 – c. 6 August 1945
- Sioux Falls Army Air Field, South Dakota, c. 15 August 1945
- Peterson Field, Colorado, 17 August – 17 October 1945
- Francis E. Warren Air Force Base, Wyoming, 1 July 1959 – 2 July 1966

=== Aircraft and missiles ===
- Douglas B-18 Bolo, 1940–1941
- Boeing B-17 Flying Fortress, 1941, 1943–1945
- Martin B-26 Marauder, 1941
- Bell P-39 Airacobra, 1941
- Curtiss P-40 Warhawk, 1941
- SM-65 Atlas, 1960–1965
- SM-68A Titan I, 1962–1965
- LGM-30 Minuteman I, 1964–1966
- Boeing EC-135, 1965–1966
- Boeing KC-135 Stratotanker, 1965–1966

=== Heraldry ===
Light blue, issuant from base a sphere light green with land areas vert, grid lined azure, the sinister quarter of the last with grid lines of the field, above the sphere in chief an olive branch arched fesswise or, overall an aircraft and a missile bendwise each trailing speedlines of the like and all within a diminished border of the last.
