= 850th Strategic Missile Squadron =

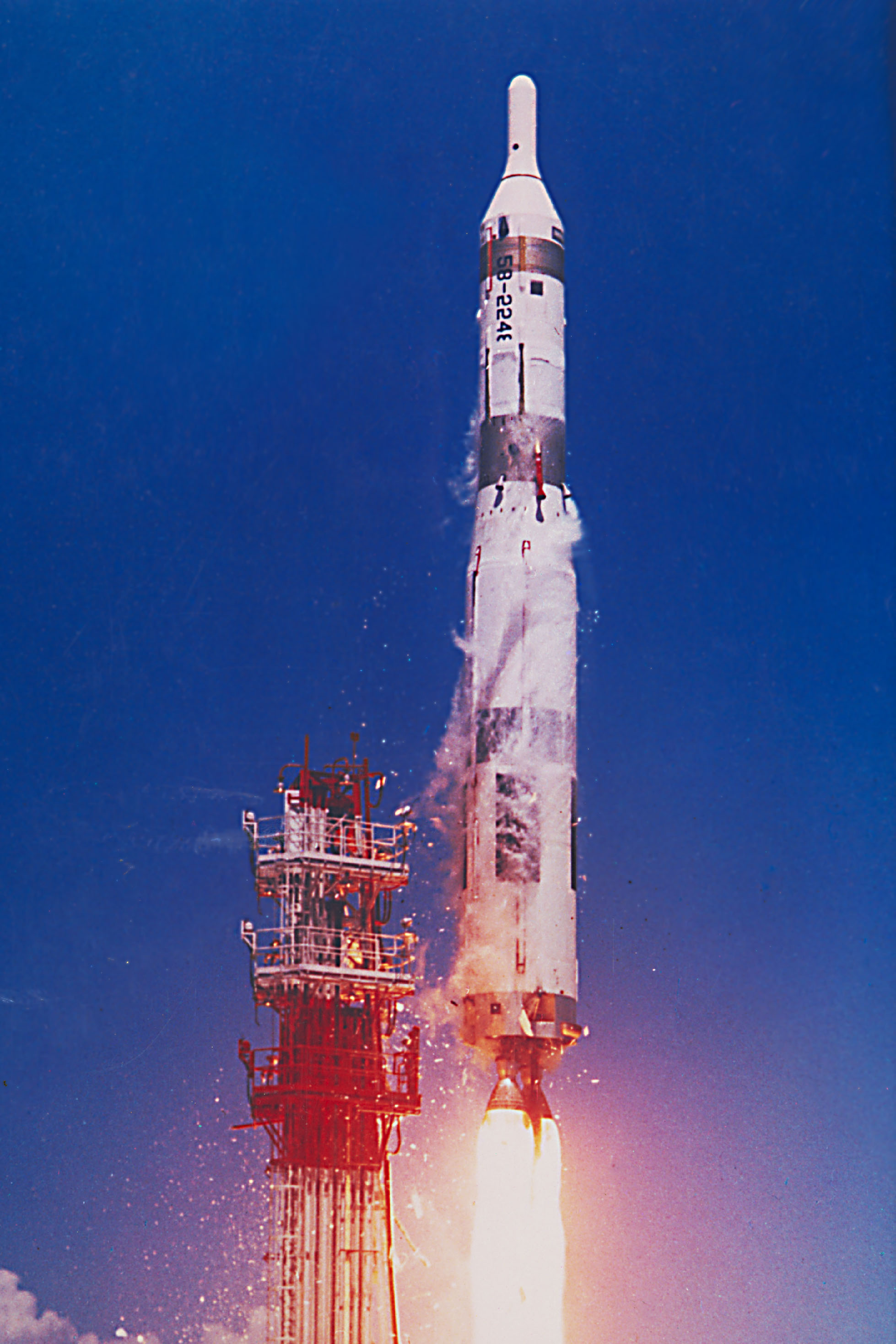
- First successful launch of an SM-68 Titan I ICBM at Cape Canaveral, Florida (Note: The launch of Titan J-7 was on 10 August 1960 using the Atlantic Missile Range.)
- Active: 1943–1945; 1960–1965
- Country: United States
- Branch: United States Air Force
- Type: Squadron
- Role: Intercontinental ballistic missile
- Motto: Always on Target (1960-1965)
- Engagements: European Theater of Operations
- Decorations: French Croix de Guerre with Palm

Insignia
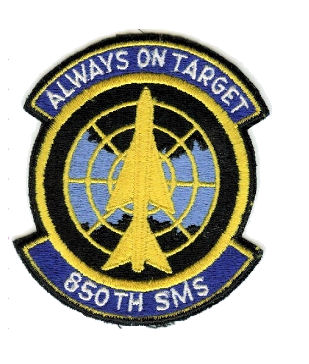
- Patch with 850th Strategic Missile Squadron emblem (Note: Approved 11 September 1962. Description: On a circular representation of a target, Air Force golden yellow and black, water areas, light blue and land areas silhouetted black, surmounted palewise throughout by an Air Force golden yellow missile in upward flight.)
- World War II fuselage code (Note: Although assigned the fuselage code, the squadron did not display the code until after the war had ended. Watkins, pp. 116-117.): 7Q

The 850th Strategic Missile Squadron is an inactive United States Air Force unit. It was last assigned to the 44th Strategic Missile Wing at Ellsworth Air Force Base, South Dakota, where it was inactivated on 25 March 1965. The squadron was first activated in 1943 as the 850th Bombardment Squadron. After training in the United States, it deployed to the European Theater of Operations and participated in the strategic bombing campaign against Germany. Following V-E Day, the squadron returned to the United States, where it was inactivated in November 1945.

The squadron was redesignated as an intercontinental ballistic missile squadron, activated in June 1960, and equipped with the SM-68 Titan I intercontinental ballistic missile, with a mission of nuclear deterrence. The squadron was inactivated as part of the phaseout of the Titan I ICBM on 25 March 1965.

== History ==
=== World War II ===
The squadron was first activated at Salt Lake City Army Air Base, Utah on 1 October 1943 as one of the four original squadrons of the 490th Bombardment Group. In December, it moved to Mountain Home Army Air Field, Idaho, where it began training with Consolidated B-24 Liberators. The 850th left its training base on 9 April 1944 for the European Theater of Operations. The ground echelon departed the port of embarkation at Camp Shanks, New York, sailing on the SS Nieuw Amsterdam on 11 April and arriving in the United Kingdom on 25 April. The air echelon flew its planes along the southern ferry route beginning on 12 April.

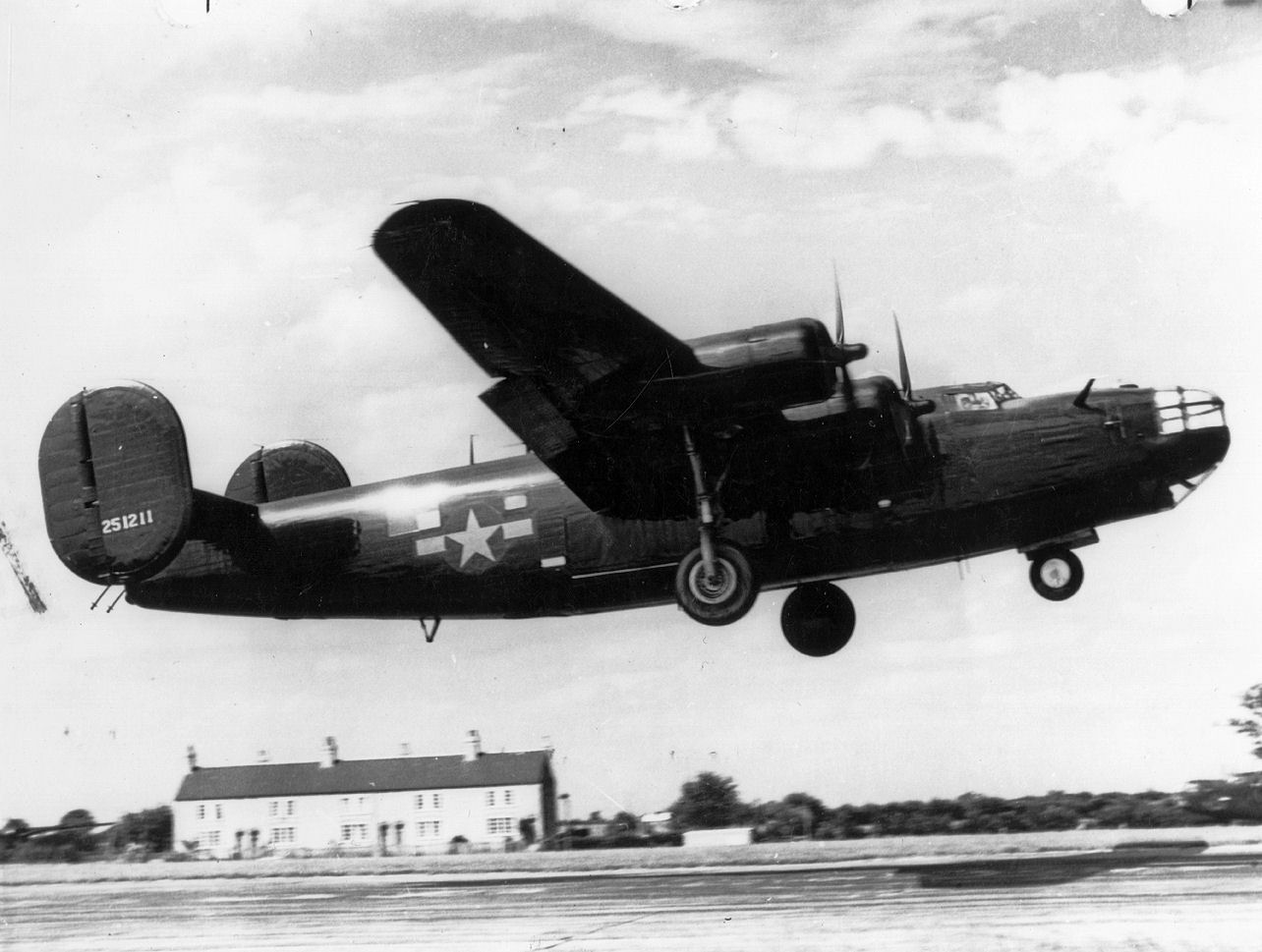
Black B-24 Liberator assigned to Carpetbagger duties (Note: Aircraft is Douglas Aircraft built Consolidated B-24H-30-DT, serial 42-51211. This aircraft was destroyed in a taxi accident on 18 October 1944. Baugher, Joe (14 May 2023). "1942 USAF Serial Numbers". Joe Baugher.)

The squadron arrived at RAF Eye, (Note: Eye had been built by US Army aviation engineers as a heavy bomber base. Anderson, p. 6.) its combat station, on 28 April Before it could begin combat with the 490th Group, the squadron moved to RAF Cheddington two weeks later and was attached to the 801st Bombardment Group (Provisional) to perform Operation Carpetbagger missions. It used its B-24s to drop personnel and supplies to the resistance forces in occupied France, Belgium, the Netherlands, Denmark, and Norway. The squadron was relieved from clandestine operations on 12 August 1944 and its personnel and equipment were transferred to the 857th Bombardment Squadron of the 492d Bombardment Group, which replaced the provisional 801st Group as Eighth Air Force's special operations unit. The 850th was awarded the French Croix de Guerre with Palm for its support of French resistance forces. The squadron was reformed at RAF Eye in the 490th Group, which was in the process of converting from Liberators to the Boeing B-17 Flying Fortress as the 93d Combat Bombardment Wing transitioned to make the 3d Bombardment Division an all B-17 unit.

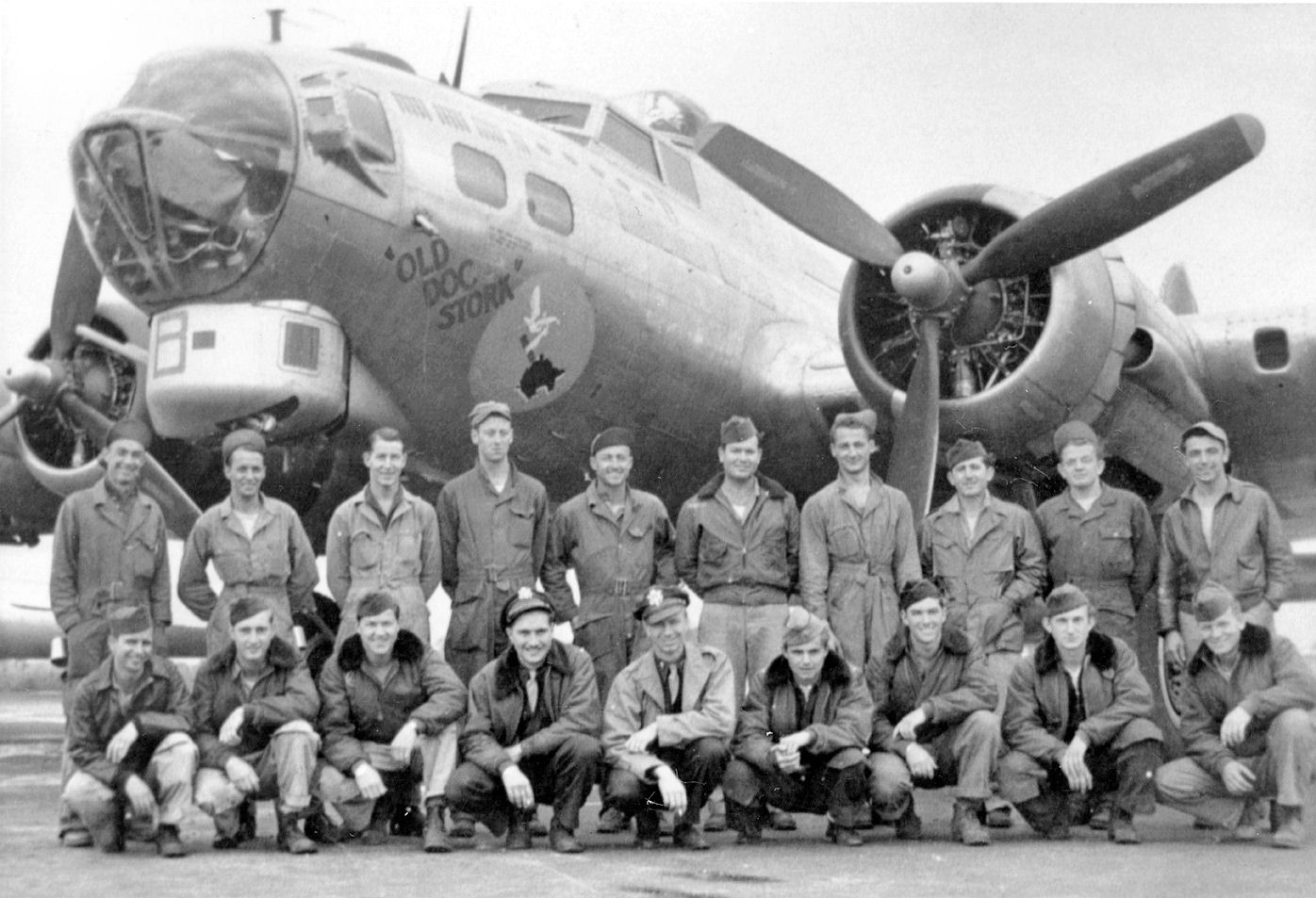
850th Bombardment Squadron crew with its B-17G (Note: Aircraft is Douglas Aircraft built Boeing B-17G-75-DL Flying Fortress, serial 44-83254, Old Doc Stork This plane survived the war and was stored at South Plains Army Air Field, Texas until sold for scrap in July 1946. Baugher, Joe (10 June 2023). "1944 USAF Serial Numbers". Joe Baugher..)

Once transition to the B-17 was completed on 24 August, the squadron concentrated on strategic bombing, attacking oil refineries, airfields, marshalling yards, and factories manufacturing aircraft and armored vehicles. It participated in raids against Berlin, Cologne, Hamburg, Hanover, Kassel, Merseburg and Münster. On occasion, the squadron was diverted from the strategic bombing campaign. It attacked enemy lines of communication during the Battle of the Bulge from December 1944 through January 1945. In the last month of the war in Europe, it carried out interdiction missions to support advancing ground forces. The squadron's last combat mission was flown on 20 April 1945.

Following V-E Day, the squadron carried food to flooded areas of the Netherlands and transported prisoners of war to Allied repatriation centers. The air echelon began flying its planes back to the United States on 6 July 1945. The ground echelon sailed from Southampton on the RMS Queen Elizabeth on 26 August 1945. The unit regrouped at Drew Field, Florida in September. It was inactivated there on 7 November 1945.

=== Intercontinental Ballistic Missile Squadron ===
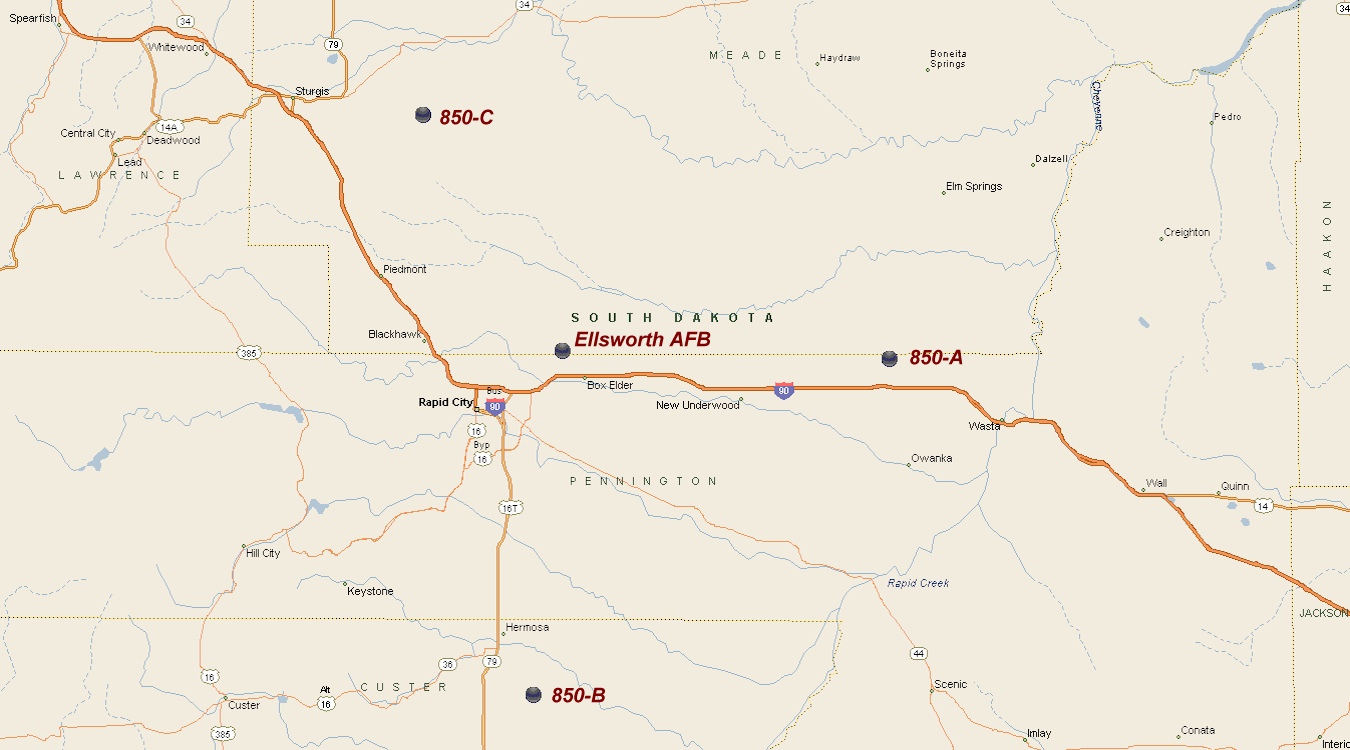
HGM-25A Titan I Missile Sites

The squadron was organized at Ellsworth Air Force Base, South Dakota in December 1960 as the 850th Strategic Missile Squadron, a SM-68 Titan I intercontinental ballistic missile launch squadron and assigned to the 28th Bombardment Wing. The squadron was deployed in a 3x3 configuration, which meant a total of nine missiles were divided into three sites. Each missile base had three missiles ready to launch at any given time. The squadron was reassigned to the newly established 44th Strategic Missile Wing on 1 January 1962. It operated three missile sites:

850-A, 4 miles NNW of Wicksville, South Dakota 44°08′10″N 102°37′02″W
850-B, 5 miles SSE of Hermosa, South Dakota 43°46′34″N 103°08′46″W
850-C, 10 miles SE of Sturgis, South Dakota 44°23′51″N 103°18′48″W

Between 8 and 15 April 1963, the squadron became the first missile squadron to be the subject of a SAC Operational Readiness Inspection. The squadron, however, did not pass the inspection. On 19 November 1964, Defense Secretary Robert S. McNamara announced the phase-out of remaining first-generation SM-65 Atlas and Titan I missiles by the end of June 1965. Consequently, the Titan Is of the 850th began to be removed from alert status on 4 January 1965. The last missile was shipped out on 12 February, and the squadron was declared nonoperational on 15 February. The Air Force subsequently inactivated the squadron on 25 March.

== Lineage ==
- Constituted as the 850th Bombardment Squadron (Heavy) on 14 September 1943

Activated on 1 October 1943
Redesignated 850th Bombardment Squadron, Heavy c. 1944
Inactivated on 7 November 1945

- Redesignated 850th Strategic Missile Squadron (ICBM-Titan) and activated on 22 June 1960 (not organized)
- Organized on 1 December 1960 (Note: Maurer omits the organization date in the lineage portion of the entry for the squadron, however he does give it as the start date for both assignment and station history. Cf. Mueller, p. 155 (dates stationed at Ellsworth).)

Inactivated on 25 March 1965

=== Assignments ===
- 490th Bombardment Group, 1 October 1943
- VIII Air Force Composite Command, 11 May 1944 (attached to 801st Bombardment Group (Provisional) after 22 May 1944)
- 490th Bombardment Group, 10 August 1944 – 7 November 1945
- Strategic Air Command, 22 June 1960 (not organized)
- 28th Bombardment Wing, 1 December 1960
- 44th Strategic Missile Wing, 1 January 1962 – 25 March 1965

=== Stations ===
- Salt Lake City Army Air Base, Utah, 1 October 1943
- Mountain Home Army Air Field, Idaho, 4 December 1943 – 9 April 1944
- RAF Eye (AAF-138), England, 27 April 1944 – c. 26 August 1945
- RAF Cheddington (AAF-113), England, 11 May 1944
- RAF Harrington (AAF-179), England, 27 May 1944
- RAF Eye, England (AAF-138), 12 August 1944-c. 26 August 1945
- Drew Field, Florida 3 September–7 November 1945
- Ellsworth Air Force Base, South Dakota, 1 December 1960 – 25 March 1965

=== Aircraft and missiles ===
- Consolidated B-24 Liberator, 1944
- Boeing B-17 Flying Fortress, 1944–1945
- SM-68 (later LGM-25A) Titan I, 1960-1965

=== Awards and campaigns ===
Award streamer	Award	Dates	Notes
	French Croix de Guerre with Palm	May–August 1944	850th Bombardment Squadron

Campaign Streamer	Campaign	Dates	Notes
	Air Offensive, Europe	28 April 1944 – 5 June 1944	850th Bombardment Squadron
	Air Combat, EAME Theater	28 April 1944 – 11 May 1945	850th Bombardment Squadron
	Normandy	6 June 1944 – 24 July 1944	850th Bombardment Squadron
	Northern France	25 July 1944 – 14 September 1944	850th Bombardment Squadron
	Rhineland	15 September 1944 – 21 March 1945	850th Bombardment Squadron
	Ardennes-Alsace	16 December 1944 – 25 January 1945	850th Bombardment Squadron
	Central Europe	22 March 1944 – 21 May 1945	850th Bombardment Squadron

== See also ==
- List of United States Air Force missile squadrons
- B-17 Flying Fortress units of the United States Army Air Forces
- B-24 Liberator units of the United States Army Air Forces
