= 851st Strategic Missile Squadron =

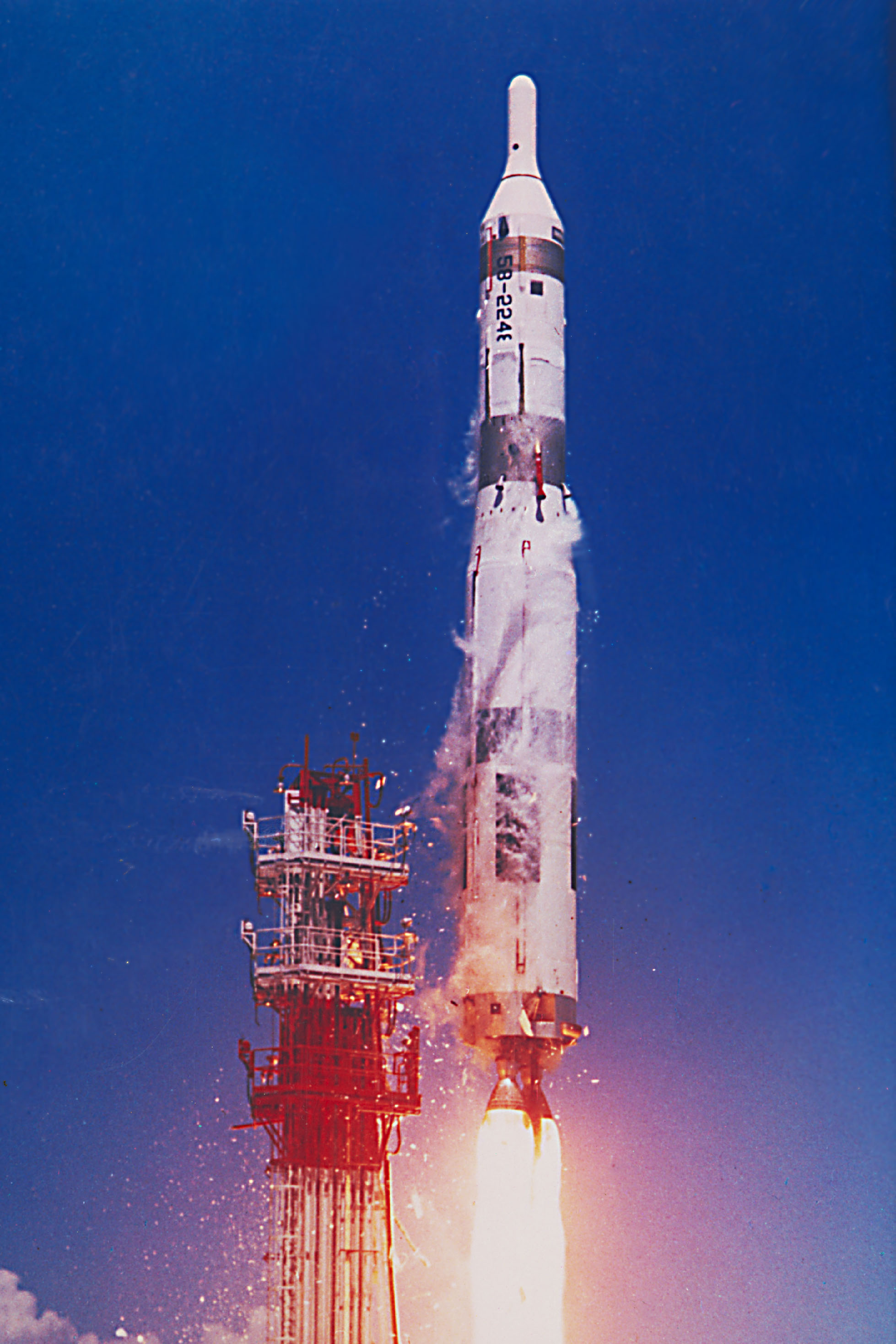
- Launch of an SM-68 Titan I
- Active: 1941–1945; 1960–1965
- Country: United States
- Branch: United States Air Force
- Type: Squadron
- Role: Intercontinental ballistic missile
- Engagements: Antisubmarine; European Theater of Operations

Insignia
- 851st Strategic Missile Squadron emblem (Note: Approved 22 March 1962. Description: On an Air Force blue disc, fimbriated white, within a red border, a white globe shaded light bluish-gray, surmounted in dexter base by an atomic symbol of three orbits counterchanged; in dexter a red and Air Force golden yellow nosecone pointing downward leaving a lightning-like trail arched to base and surmounting the globe in sinister, red, bordered Air Force golden yellow.)
- World War II fuselage code (Note: Although assigned the fuselage code, the squadron did not display the code until after the war had ended. Watkins, pp. 116–117.): S3

The 851st Strategic Missile Squadron is an inactive United States Air Force unit. It was last assigned to the 456th Strategic Aerospace Wing, stationed at Beale Air Force Base, California. It was equipped with the HGM-25A Titan I intercontinental ballistic missile, with a mission of nuclear deterrence. It was the last Titan I squadron to achieve alert status on 1 February 1961. The squadron was inactivated as part of the phaseout of the Titan I on 25 March 1965.

The squadron was first activated as the 78th Bombardment Squadron in November 1940. Following the attack on Pearl Harbor, the squadron began flying antisubmarine patrols off the Atlantic coast, and later in the Gulf of Mexico and Caribbean, redesignating as the 7th Antisubmarine Squadron in November 1942. After the Navy assumed the coastal antisubmarine mission in 1943, the squadron moved to Mountain Home Army Air Field, where it became the 851st Bombardment Squadron and formed the cadre for the new 490th Bombardment Group. After training in the United States, it deployed to the European Theater of Operations and participated in the strategic bombing campaign against Germany. Following V-E Day, the squadron returned to the United States, where it was inactivated in November 1945. It was organized as an intercontinental ballistic missile squadron in 1961.

== History ==
=== World War II ===
==== Organization and antisubmarine warfare ====
The squadron was organized at Army Air Base, Savannah, Georgia in January 1941 as the 78th Bombardment Squadron, one of the original squadrons of the 45th Bombardment Group, and equipped with Douglas A-20 Havocs (along with a few DB-7s, an export version of the A-20). (Note: The United States impounded 356 DB-7s ordered for France or Great Britain Baugher, Joseph (27 October 2001). "Douglas DB-73". Joe Baugher..) In June the 80th moved with the group to Army Air Base, Manchester, New Hampshire.

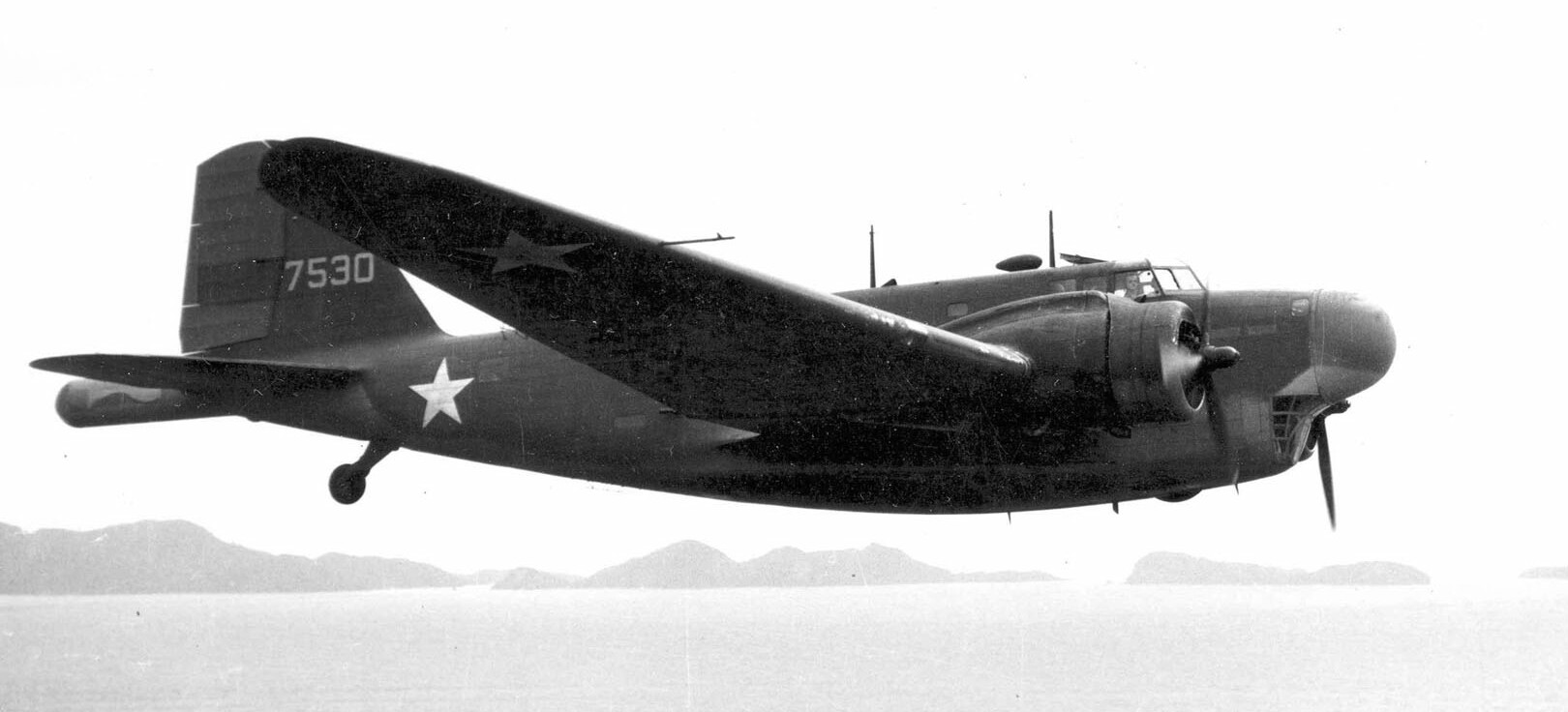
Douglas B-18B equipped for antisubmarine warfare

Following the attack on Pearl Harbor the squadron began flying antisubmarine patrols off the Atlantic coast. In 1942, it converted to the Douglas B-18 Bolo, which was equipped with radar for the antisubmarine mission. The squadron moved to Langley Field, Virginia in April 1942 and to Jacksonville Army Air Field, Florida in May.

In October 1942, the Army Air Forces organized its antisubmarine forces into the single Army Air Forces Antisubmarine Command, which established the 26th Antisubmarine Wing the following month to control its forces operating over the Gulf of Mexico and the Caribbean Sea. The command's bombardment group headquarters, including the 45th, were inactivated and the squadron, now designated the 7th Antisubmarine Squadron, was assigned directly to the 26th Wing. However, most squadron missions were flown over the Atlantic, so the 7th was attached to 25th Antisubmarine Wing, whose area of responsibility covered the Atlantic coast.

By the fall of 1942, the U-boat threat along the Atlantic coast had substantially diminished, but German wolfpacks were attacking merchant shipping in the waters near Trinidad. In April 1943, the squadron began operating from Edinburgh Field, where it joined elements of the 25th Bombardment Group, a Sixth Air Force unit, that was also engaged in antisubmarine patrols. They remained there until July 1943, when the 23d Antisubmarine Squadron deployed to Edinburgh to experiment with its 75mm cannon armed North American B-25 Mitchells in the antisubmarine role and the 7th returned to its base in Jacksonville.

In July 1943, the AAF and Navy reached an agreement to transfer the coastal antisubmarine mission to the Navy. This mission transfer also included an exchange of AAF long-range bombers equipped for antisubmarine warfare for Navy Consolidated B-24 Liberators without such equipment.

==== Combat in the European Theater ====
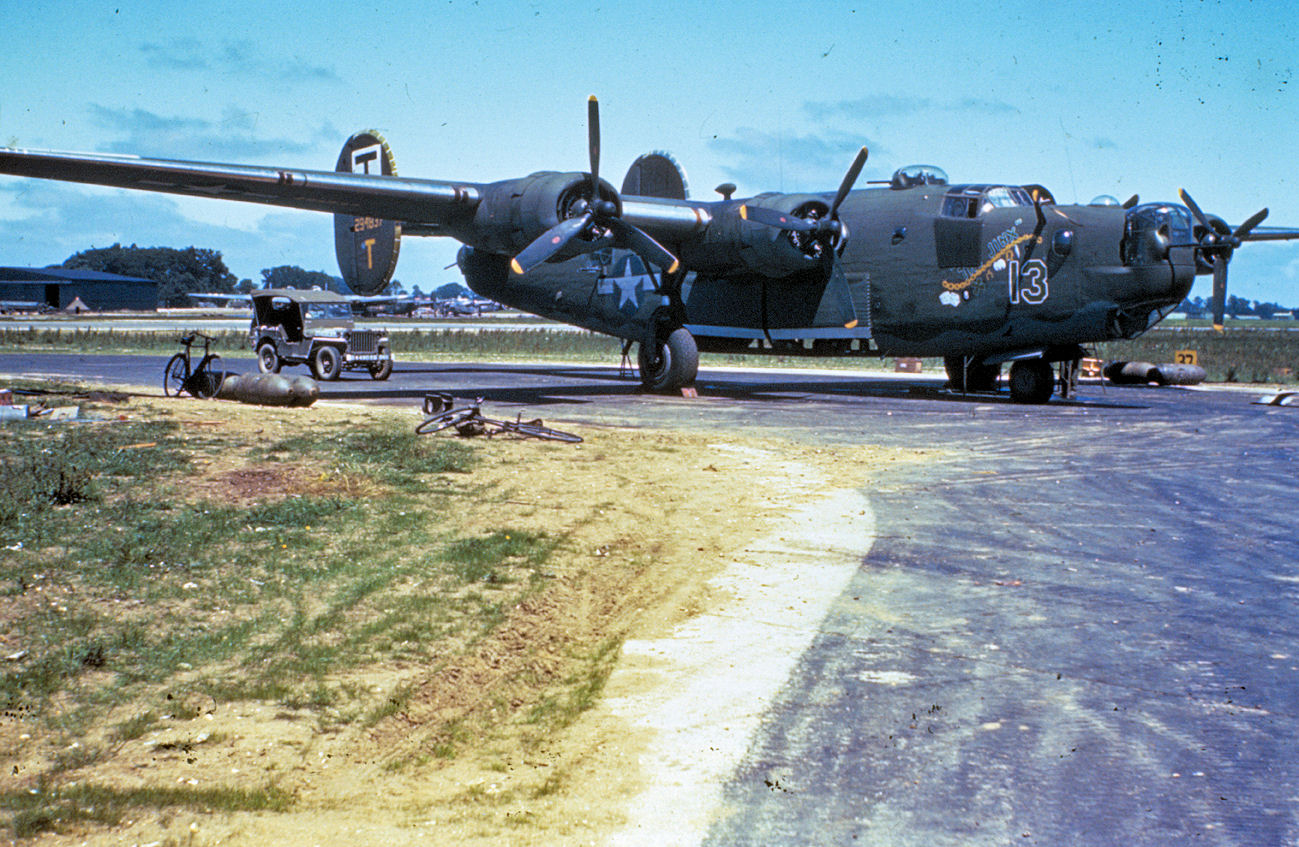
490th Bombardment Group B-24 Liberator (Note: Aircraft is Ford Motors built Consolidated B-24H-20-FO Liberator, serial 42-94837, The Jinx. This plane was broken up in the United Kingdom in May 1945. Baugher, Joe (26 July 2023). "1942 USAF Serial Numbers". Joe Baugher.)

The squadron moved to Mountain Home Army Air Field, Idaho on 27 September 1943. On 1 October, it formed the cadre for the new 490th Bombardment Group. In early December, group headquarters and the other three squadrons of the group joined it at Mountain Home and it began training with Consolidated B-24 Liberators. The 851st left its training base on 9 April 1944 for the European Theater of Operations. The ground echelon departed the port of embarkation at Camp Shanks, New York, sailing on the SS Nieuw Amsterdam on 11 April and arriving in the United Kingdom on 25 April. The air echelon flew its planes along the southern ferry route beginning on 12 April.

The squadron arrived at RAF Eye, (Note: Unlike most bases used by the Army Air Forces in the United Kingdom, Eye had been built by US Army aviation engineers as a heavy bomber base. Anderson, p. 6.) its combat station, on 28 April and began combat operations on 31 May 1944. Its initial missions were flown to prepare for Operation Overlord, the invasion of Normandy, as the squadron concentrated on targets in France. It supported the landings on D-Day and attacked coastal defenses, airfields, rail lines and vehicles near the landings. It flew close air support missions to assist British forces near Caen in July and American forces near Brest in September. It was withdrawn from combat on 6 August 1944, to convert to the Boeing B-17 Flying Fortress as the 93d Combat Bombardment Wing transitioned to make the 3d Bombardment Division an all B-17 unit.

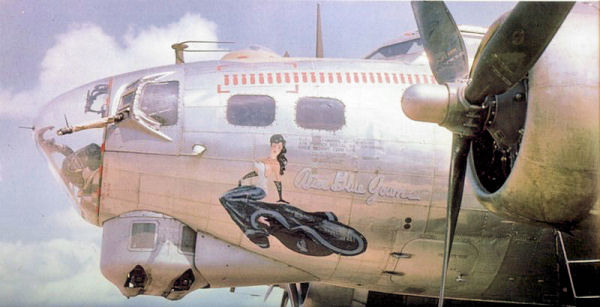
851st Bombardment Squadron B-17 (Note: Aircraft is Boeing B-17G-85-BO Flying Fortress, serial 43-38400, Alice Blue Gown. After the war this plane returned to the United States and was put into storage at Kingman Army Air Field on 15 December 1945. It was sold for scrap in July 1946. Baugher, Joe (14 May 2023). "1943 USAF Serial Numbers". Joe Baugher. Photograph taken at RAF Eye. This aircraft completed 67 missions.)

Once transition to the B-17 was completed on 24 August, the squadron concentrated on strategic bombing, attacking oil refineries, airfields, marshalling yards, and factories manufacturing aircraft and armored vehicles. It participated in raids against Berlin, Cologne, Hamburg, Hanover, Kassel, Merseburg and Münster. On occasion, the squadron was diverted from the strategic bombing campaign. It attacked enemy lines of communication during the Battle of the Bulge from December 1944 through January 1945. In the last month of the war in Europe, it carried out interdiction missions to support advancing ground forces. The squadron's last combat mission was flown on 20 April 1945.

Following V-E Day, the squadron carried food to flooded areas of the Netherlands and transported prisoners of war to Allied repatriation centers. The air echelon began flying its planes back to the United States on 6 July 1945. The ground echelon sailed from Southampton on the RMS Queen Elizabeth on 26 August 1945. The unit regrouped at Drew Field, Florida in September. It was inactivated there on 7 November 1945.

=== Intercontinental ballistic missile squadron ===
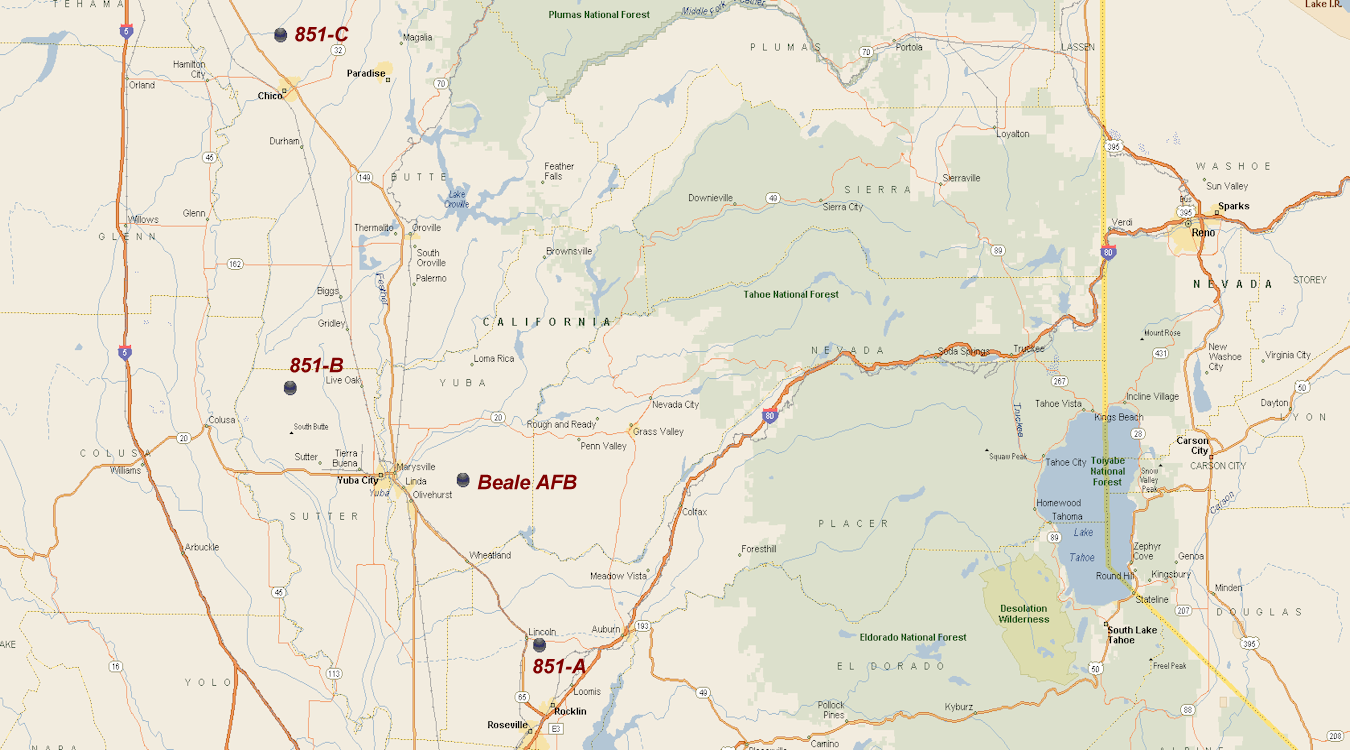
HGM-25A Titan I Missile Sites

The squadron was again organized in February 1961 as a Strategic Air Command (SAC) SM-68 Titan I intercontinental ballistic missile launch squadron. On 1 April 1961, SAC placed the 851st Strategic Missile Squadron on operational status. In September 1962, the 851st became the last Titan I Squadron to achieve alert status. The squadron's missiles were deployed in a 3x3 configuration, which meant a total of nine missiles were divided into three sites. Each missile site had three ICBM missiles. Missiles were installed in the silos between 28 February and 20 April 1962. The missile sites were:

851-A, 2 miles ESE of Lincoln, California 38°52′54″N 121°15′56″W
851-B, 4 miles NNE of Sutter Buttes, California 39°16′32″N 121°49′46″W
851-C, 6 miles N of Chico, California 39°49′05″N 121°51′10″W

On 24 May 1962, during a contractor checkout of a missile, a blast rocked launcher 1 at complex 4C at Chico (851-C), destroying a Titan I and causing heavy damage to the silo. After the investigation, the Air Force concluded that the two separate explosions occurred because of a blocked vent and blocked valve. After damages were repaired, the Chico complex became operational again on 9 March 1963.

In November 1962, two months after the squadron became fully operational, SAC subjected the unit to an operational readiness inspection. The 851st became the first Titan I unit to pass.

On 19 November 1964, Defense Secretary Robert S. McNamara announced the phase-out of remaining first-generation Titan I missiles by the end of June 1965. Consequently, the Titan Is of the 851st were removed from alert status on 4 January 1965. The last missile was shipped out on 10 February. The Air Force subsequently inactivated the squadron on 25 March.

== Lineage ==
- Constituted as the 78th Bombardment Squadron (Light) on 20 November 1940

Activated on 15 January 1941
Redesignated 78th Bombardment Squadron (Medium) on 30 December 1941
Redesignated 7th Antisubmarine Squadron (Heavy) on 29 November 1942
Redesignated 851st Bombardment Squadron (Heavy) on 27 September 1943
Redesignated 851st Bombardment Squadron, Heavy c. 1944
Inactivated on 7 November 1945

- Redesignated 851st Strategic Missile Squadron (ICBM-Titan) and activated on 25 August 1960 (not organized)

Organized on 1 February 1961
Discontinued and inactivated 25 March 1965

=== Assignments ===
- 45th Bombardment Group, 15 January 1941
- 26th Antisubmarine Wing, 8 December 1942 (attached to 25th Antisubmarine Wing, c. 16 December 1942; 25th Bombardment Group, 4 April – 20 July 1943
- 490th Bombardment Group, October 1943 – 7 November 1945
- Strategic Air Command, 25 August 1960 (not organized)
- 4126th Strategic Wing, 1 February 1961
- 456th Strategic Aerospace Wing, 1 February 1963 – 25 March 1965

=== Stations ===
- Army Air Base, Savannah, Georgia, 15 January 1941
- Army Air Base, Manchester (later Grenier Field), New Hampshire, 20 June 1941
- Langley Field, Virginia, 9 April 1942
- Jacksonville Army Air Field, Florida, 16 May 1942 (operated from Edinburgh Field, Trinidad, 20 April – 20 July 1943)
- Mountain Home Army Air Field, Idaho, 27 September 1943 – 9 April 1944
- RAF Eye (Station 134), England, 28 April 1944 – c. 26 August 1945
- Drew Field, Florida, 3 September 1945 – 7 November 1945
- Beale Air Force Base, California, 1 February 1961 – 25 March 1965

=== Aircraft and missiles ===
- Douglas A-20 Havoc, 1941–1942
- Douglas DB-7, 1941–1942
- Douglas B-18 Bolo, 1942–1943
- Consolidated B-24 Liberator, 1944
- Boeing B-17 Flying Fortress, 1944–1945
- SM-68 (later HGM-25A) Titan I, 1962–1965

=== Campaigns ===
Campaign Streamer	Campaign	Dates	Notes
	Antisubmarine	7 December 1941 – 1 August 1943	78th Bombardment Squadron (later 7th Antisubmarine Squadron)
	Air Offensive, Europe	28 April 1944 – 5 June 1944	851st Bombardment Squadron
	Air Combat, EAME Theater	28 April 1944 – 11 May 1945	851st Bombardment Squadron
	Normandy	6 June 1944 – 24 July 1944	851st Bombardment Squadron
	Northern France	25 July 1944 – 14 September 1944	851st Bombardment Squadron
	Rhineland	15 September 1944 – 21 March 1945	851st Bombardment Squadron
	Ardennes-Alsace	16 December 1944 – 25 January 1945	851st Bombardment Squadron
	Central Europe	22 March 1944 – 21 May 1945	851st Bombardment Squadron

== See also ==
- List of United States Air Force missile squadrons
- B-17 Flying Fortress units of the United States Army Air Forces
- B-24 Liberator units of the United States Army Air Forces
