= 849th Strategic Missile Squadron =

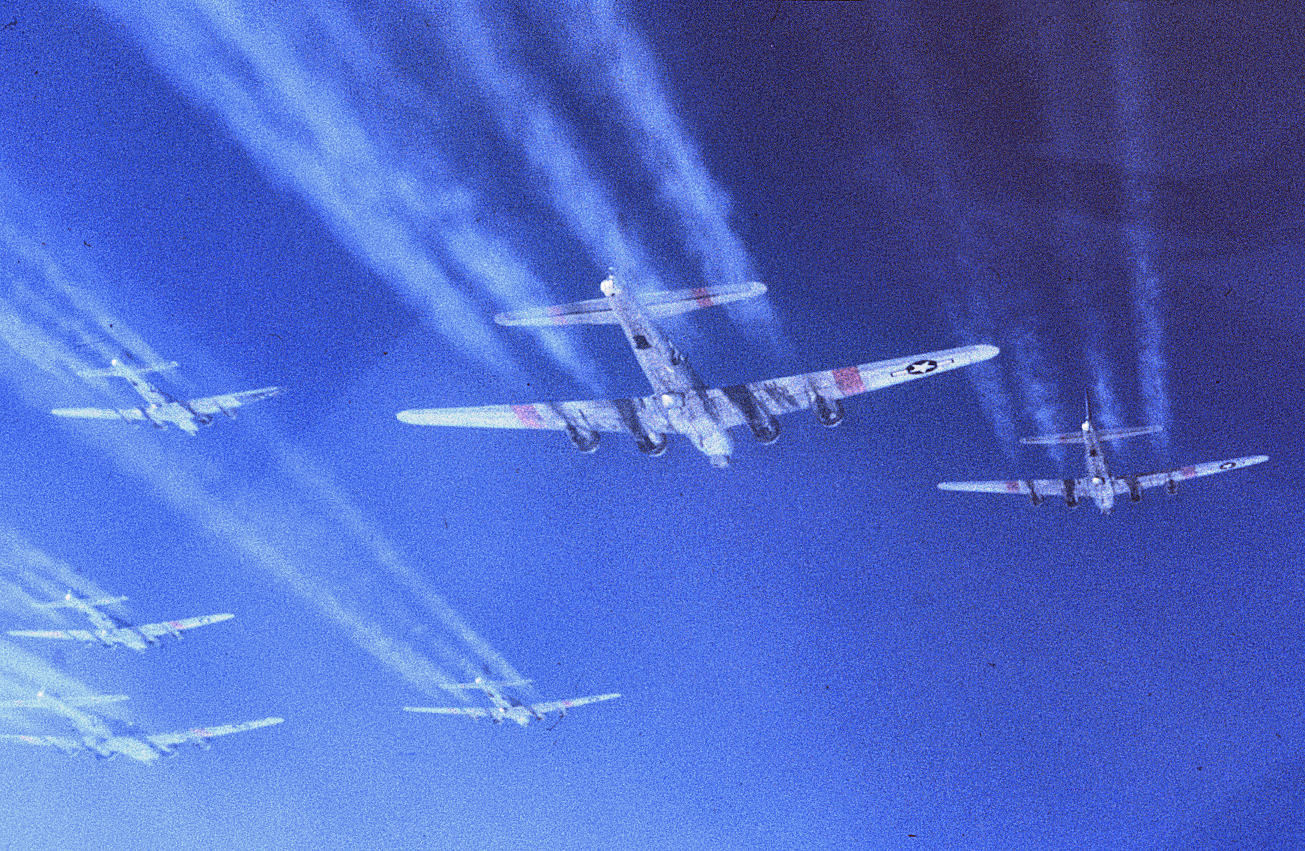
- 490th Bombardment Group B-17G Flying Fortresses in formation during a mission
- Active: 1943-1945; 1960-1961
- Country: United States
- Branch: United States Air Force
- Role: intercontinental ballistic missile

Insignia
- World War II fuselage code (Note: Although assigned the fuselage code, the squadron did not display the code until after the war had ended. Watkins, pp. 116-117.): W8

The 849th Strategic Missile Squadron is an inactive United States Air Force unit. It was last assigned to the 703d Strategic Missile Wing at Lowry Air Force Base, Colorado, where it was inactivated on 1 July 1961 and its assets transferred to another squadron that was simultaneously activated.

The squadron was first activated in 1943 as the 849th Bombardment Squadron. After training in the United States, it deployed to the European Theater of Operations and participated in the strategic bombing campaign against Germany. Following V-E Day, the squadron returned to the United States, where it was inactivated in November 1945. It was activated as an intercontinental ballistic missile squadron in 1960.

== History ==
=== World War II ===
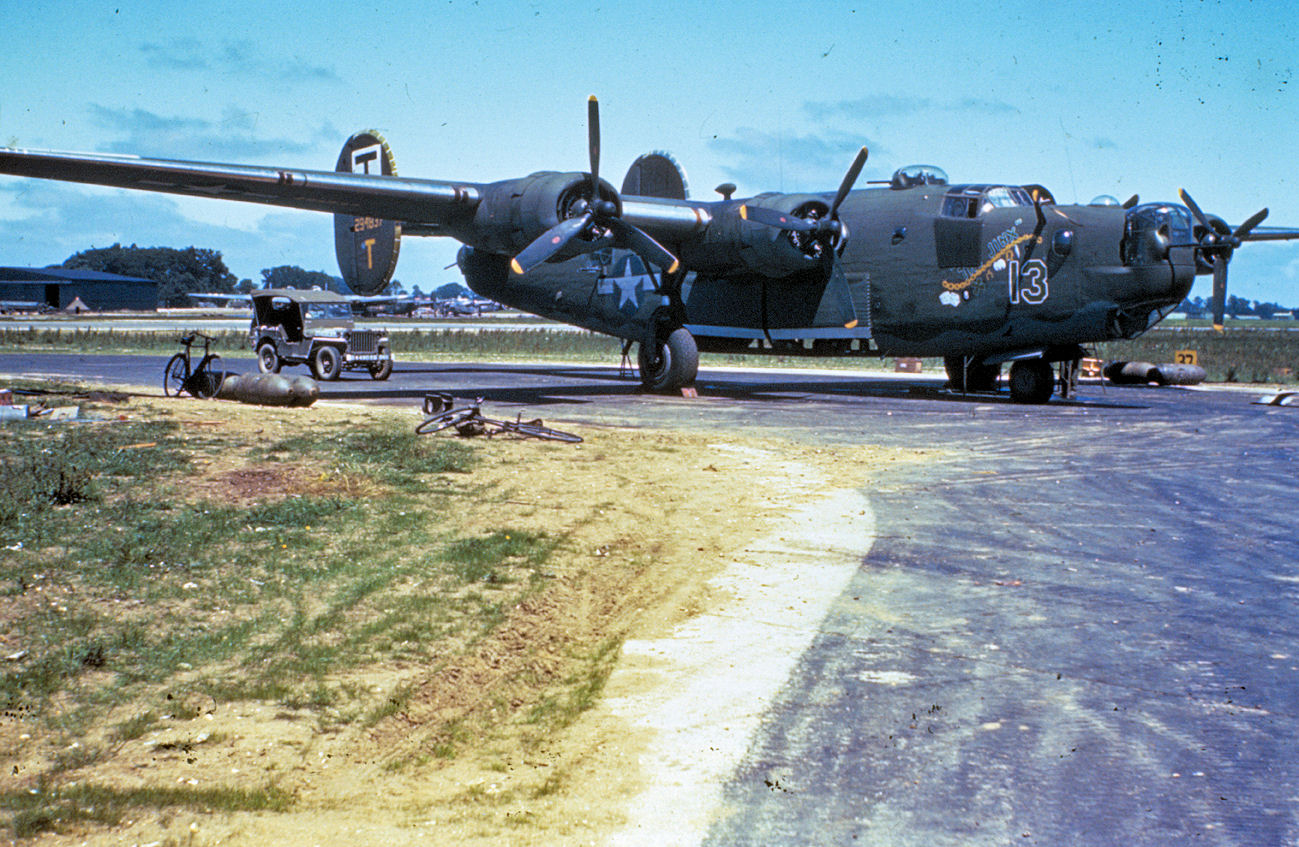
490th Bombardment Group B-24 Liberator (Note: Aircraft is Ford Motors built Consolidated B-24H-20-FO Liberator, serial 42-94837, The Jinx. This plane was broken up in the United Kingdom in May 1945. Baugher, Joe (26 July 2023). "1942 USAF Serial Numbers". Joe Baugher.)

The squadron was first activated at Salt Lake City Army Air Base, Utah on 1 October 1943 as one of the four original squadrons of the 490th Bombardment Group. In December, it moved to Mountain Home Army Air Field, Idaho, where it began training with Consolidated B-24 Liberators. The 849th left its training base on 9 April 1944 for the European Theater of Operations. The ground echelon departed the port of embarkation at Camp Shanks, New York, sailing on the SS Nieuw Amsterdam on 11 April and arriving in the United Kingdom on 25 April. The air echelon flew its planes along the southern ferry route beginning on 12 April.

The squadron arrived at RAF Eye, (Note: Eye had been built by US Army aviation engineers as a heavy bomber base. Anderson, p. 6.) its combat station, on 28 April and began combat operations on 31 May 1944. Its initial missions were flown to prepare for Operation Overlord, the invasion of Normandy, as the squadron concentrated on targets in France. It supported the landings on D-Day and attacked coastal defenses, airfields, rail lines and vehicles near the landings. It flew close air support missions to assist British forces near Caen in July and American forces near Brest in September. It was withdrawn from combat on 6 August 1944, to convert to the Boeing B-17 Flying Fortress as the 93d Combat Bombardment Wing transitioned to make the 3d Bombardment Division an all B-17 unit.

Once transition to the B-17 was completed on 24 August, the squadron concentrated on strategic bombing, attacking oil refineries, airfields, marshalling yards, and factories manufacturing aircraft and armored vehicles. It participated in raids against Berlin, Cologne, Hamburg, Hanover, Kassel, Merseburg and Münster. On occasion, the squadron was diverted from the strategic bombing campaign. It attacked enemy lines of communication during the Battle of the Bulge from December 1944 through January 1945. In the last month of the war in Europe, it carried out interdiction missions to support advancing ground forces. The squadron's last combat mission was flown on 20 April 1945.

Following V-E Day, the squadron carried food to flooded areas of the Netherlands and transported prisoners of war to Allied repatriation centers. The air echelon began flying its planes back to the United States on 6 July 1945. The ground echelon sailed from Southampton on the RMS Queen Elizabeth on 26 August 1945. The unit regrouped at Drew Field, Florida in September. It was inactivated there on 7 November 1945.

=== Strategic missile operations ===
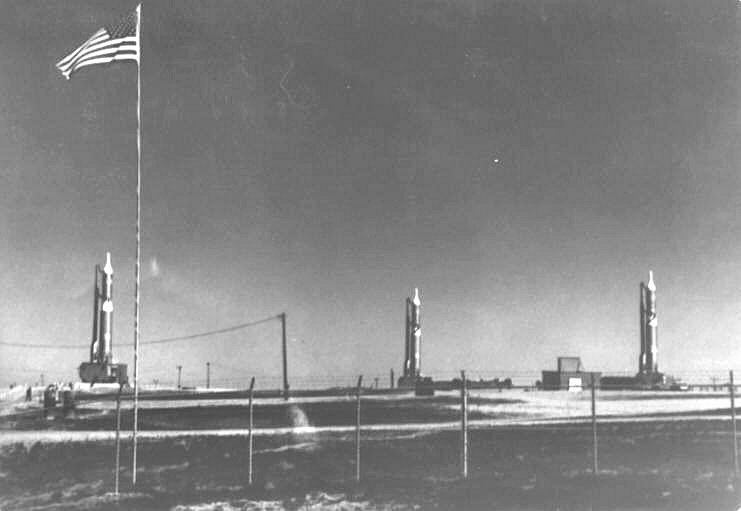
Titan I Missiles at Lowry AFB

The squadron was redesignated the 849th Strategic Missile Squadron and organized at Lowry Air Force Base, Colorado in August 1960, where it was assigned to the 703d Strategic Missile Wing. The squadron began to train with the SM-68 Titan I intercontinental ballistic missile, but was nonoperational. On 1 July 1961, the squadron was inactivated and its assets transferred to the 725th Strategic Missile Squadron, which was simultaneously activated at Lowry.

== Lineage ==
- Constituted as the 849th Bombardment Squadron (Heavy) on 14 September 1943

Activated on 1 October 1943
Redesignated 849th Bombardment Squadron, Heavy c. 1944
Inactivated on 7 November 1945

- Redesignated 849th Strategic Missile Squadron (ICBM-Titan) and activated on 29 February 1960 (not organized)

Organized on 1 August 1960
Discontinued and inactivated on 1 July 1961

=== Assignments ===
- 490th Bombardment Group, 1 October 1943 – 7 November 1945
- Strategic Air Command, 29 February 1960
- 703d Strategic Missile Wing, 1 August 1960 – 1 July 1961

=== Stations ===
- Salt Lake City Army Air Base, Utah, 1 October 1943
- Mountain Home Army Air Field, Idaho, 4 December 1943 – 9 April 1944
- RAF Eye (AAF-138), England, 27 April 1944 – c. 26 August 1945
- Drew Field, Florida 3 September–7 November 1945
- Lowry Air Force Base, Colorado, 1 August 1960 – 1 July 1961

=== Aircraft and missiles ===
- Consolidated B-24 Liberator, 1944
- Boeing B-17 Flying Fortress, 1944–1945
- SM-68 Titan I, 1960-1961

=== Campaigns ===
Campaign Streamer	Campaign	Dates	Notes
	Air Offensive, Europe	28 April 1944 – 5 June 1944	849th Bombardment Squadron
	Air Combat, EAME Theater	28 April 1944ť–11 May 1945	849th Bombardment Squadron
	Normandy	6 June 1944 – 24 July 1944	849th Bombardment Squadron
	Northern France	25 July 1944 – 14 September 1944	849th Bombardment Squadron
	Rhineland	15 September 1944 – 21 March 1945	849th Bombardment Squadron
	Ardennes-Alsace	16 December 1944 – 25 January 1945	849th Bombardment Squadron
	Central Europe	22 March 1944 – 21 May 1945	849th Bombardment Squadron

== See also ==
- B-17 Flying Fortress units of the United States Army Air Forces
- B-24 Liberator units of the United States Army Air Forces
