= 703rd Strategic Missile Wing =

- Active: 1958–1961
- Country: United States
- Branch: United States Air Force
- Role: intercontinental ballistic missile

The 703rd Strategic Missile Wing is an inactive United States Air Force unit. It was last assigned to Strategic Air Command's 13th Air Division at Lowry Air Force Base, Colorado. It was Strategic Air Command's first Titan I wing, but never achieved full operational status. It was inactivated on 1 July 1961 and its assets transferred to another wing.

== History ==
The 703rd was the first HGM-25A Titan I Intercontinental ballistic missile wing. It was activated on 25 September 1958, but never became fully operational. Partial capability was achieved on 10 December 1958, with training on the operation of the Titan I ICBM until March 1960.

The missiles, personnel and facilities of the wing were reassigned to the 451st Strategic Missile Wing on 1 July 1961 and the unit was inactivated.

== Lineage ==
- Established as 703rd Strategic Missile Wing (ICBM-Titan) on 5 September 1958

Activated on 25 September 1958
Discontinued and inactivated on 1 July 1961

- Consolidated with the 303rd Fighter Wing on 31 July 1985 as the 503rd Tactical Missile Wing

=== Assignments ===
- 1st Missile Division, 25 September 1958
- Fifteenth Air Force, 15 January 1959
- 13th Air Division, 1 July 1959 – 1 July 1961

=== Components ===
- 848th Strategic Missile Squadron: 1 February 1960 – 1 July 1961
- 849th Strategic Missile Squadron: 1 August 1960 – 1 July 1961

=== Stations ===
- Lowry Air Force Base, Colorado, 25 September 1958 – 1 July 1961

=== Missiles ===
- HGM-25A Titan I
