= RAF Eye =

Former RAF station in Suffolk, England

RAF Eye USAAF Station 134
- Located Near Stowmarket, Suffolk, United Kingdom
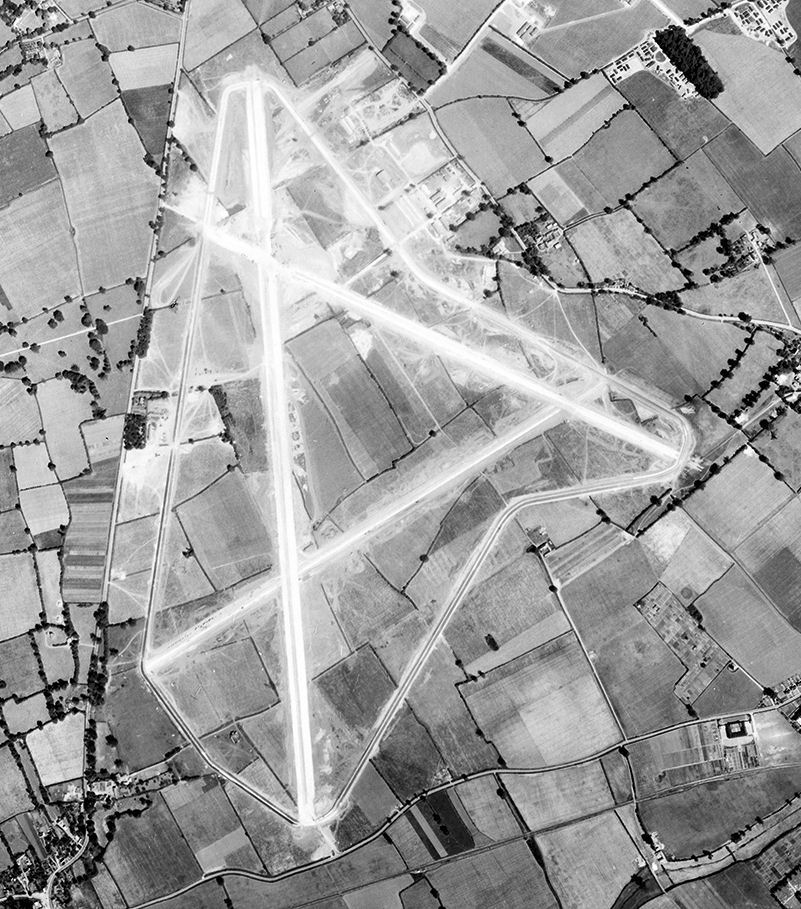
- Aerial photograph of Eye Airfield, looking north, 16 July 1943 while still under construction . Photograph taken by 7th Photographic Reconnaissance Group, oriented north.

Site information
- Type: Royal Air Force station
- Code: EY
- Controlled by: Royal Air Force; United States Army Air Forces

Location
- RAF Eye, shown within Suffolk
- Coordinates: 52°19′58.73″N 001°07′47.65″E

Site history
- Built: 1943
- In use: 1944-1963
- Battles/wars: European Theatre of World War II; Air Offensive, Europe July 1942 - May 1945

Garrison information
- Garrison: Eighth Air Force; RAF Bomber Command
- Occupants: 490th Bombardment Group

Royal Air Force Eye or more simply RAF Eye is a former Royal Air Force station located 11 miles (18 km) northeast of Stowmarket, Suffolk, England on the northwest edge of Eye and south of Diss.

== History ==
Eye was a standard Class A airfield for heavy bombers. The U.S. Army 829th Engineer Battalion began construction of this WWII air base in September 1942, with the 827th Battalion arriving that December to assist. The 859th Battalion arrived in May of the following year when the 829th Battalion left. The bulk of the work was done in the summer of 1943 with the 827th setting records in pouring concrete while the 859th made their mark in building construction. Additional work was performed by British contractors.

The airfield was declared operational and turned over to the U.S. Army Air Forces on 7 December 1943, two years after the attack on Pearl Harbor. On 1 April 1944, the entire airfield was complete and occupied by the 8th Air Force, which designated it AAF Station 134. RAF Eye was one of the last wartime airfields to be built in the area and some of the equipment used in its construction remained for many years after the war.

=== United States Army Air Forces use ===
USAAF Station Units assigned to RAF Eye were:

- 477th Sub-Depot
- 18th Weather Squadron
- 329th Station Complement Squadron
- 1240th Quartermaster Company
- 1276th Military Police Company
- 1448th Ordnance Supply & Maintenance Company
- 814th Chemical Company
- 2116th Engineer Fire Fighting Platoon

==== 490th Bombardment Group (Heavy) ====
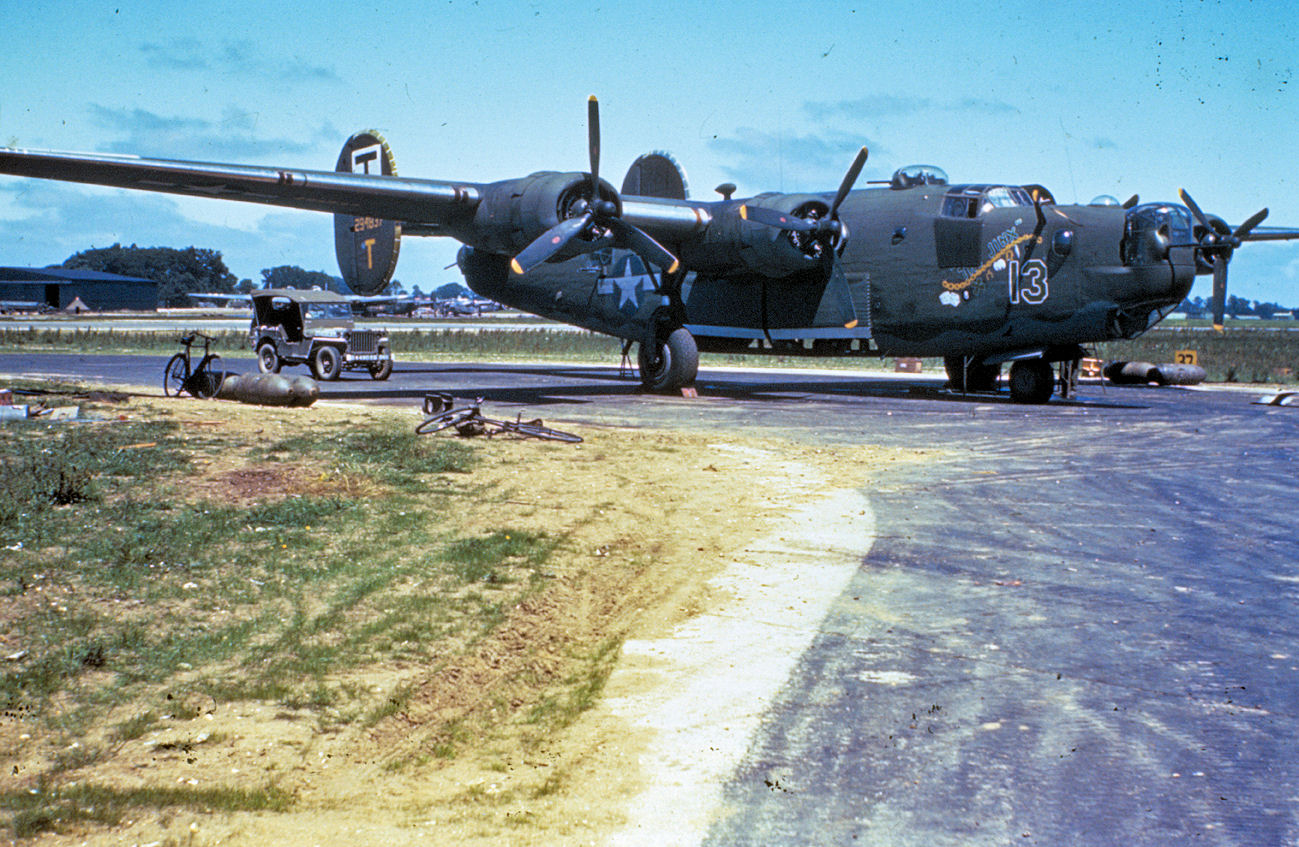
Ground personnel of the 490th Bomb Group work on a B-24 Liberator (serial number 42-94837) nicknamed "The Jinx 13" at Eye.

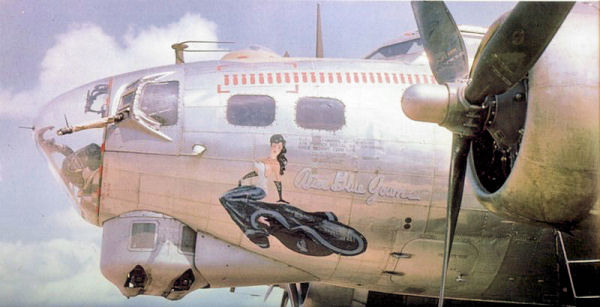
Boeing B-17G-85-BO Fortress Serial No. 43-38400 "Alice Blue Gown" of the 851st Bomb Squadron. This aircraft completed 67 missions.

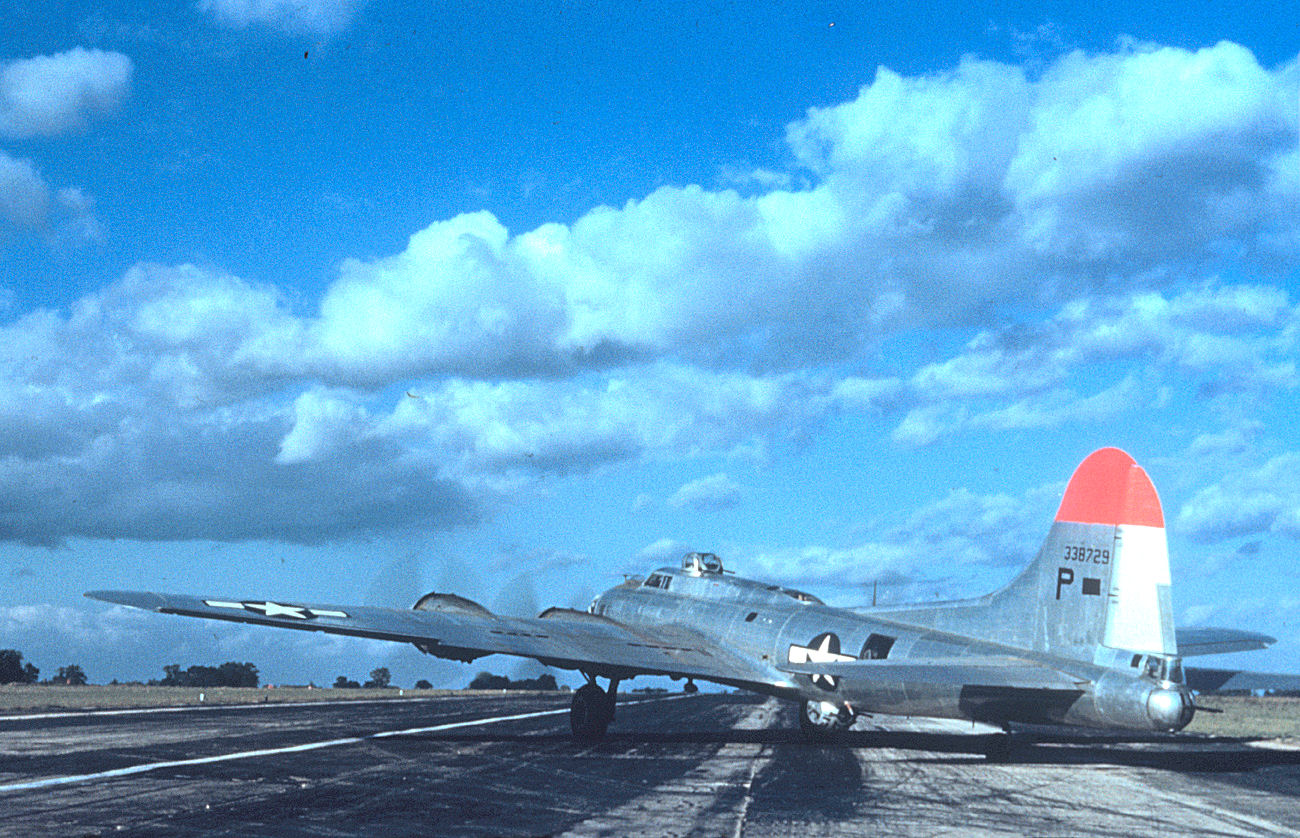
A B-17 Flying Fortress (serial number 43-38729) of the 490th Bomb Group moves into takeoff position at Eye

The airfield was opened on 1 May 1944 and was used by the United States Army Air Forces Eighth Air Force 490th Bombardment Group (Heavy). The 490th arrived from Mountain Home AAF Idaho and was assigned to the 93d Combat Bombardment Wing. The group flew Boeing B-17 Flying Fortresses and Consolidated B-24 Liberators as part of the Eighth Air Force's strategic bombing campaign.

The group tail code was initially a "Square-T" when it moved in with B-24 Liberators. After being re-equipped with B-17G Flying Fortresses, it adopted a red stripe at the top of aircraft fins.

Operational flying squadrons of the group were:

- 848th Bombardment Squadron (7W)
- 849th Bombardment Squadron (W8)
- 850th Bombardment Squadron (7Q)
- 851st Bombardment Squadron (S3)

The 490th BG entered combat in June 1944 with B-24s, bombing airfields and coastal defences in France immediately preceding and during the invasion of Normandy. They targeted bridges, rail lines, vehicles, road junctions, and troop concentrations in France, in support of ground forces near Caen in July and near Brest in September 1944.

The group converted to B-17s in October and operated primarily against strategic targets until the end of February 1945. The 490th mounted attacks against enemy oil plants, tank factories, marshalling yards, aircraft plants, and airfields in such cities as Berlin, Hamburg, Merseburg, Münster, Kassel, Hannover, and Cologne. They interrupted strategic missions to attack supply lines and military installations during the Battle of the Bulge, December 1944-January 1945. Beginning in March 1945, they attacked interdictory targets and supported advancing ground forces.

After V-E Day, they carried food to flood stricken areas of the Netherlands and transported French, Spanish, and Belgian prisoners of war from Austria to Allied centres.

The 490th returned to the US to Drew Field, Florida on 3 September 1945, then was inactivated on 7 November 1945.

=== Postwar RAF use ===
With the war over, Eye transferred to RAF Bomber Command on 1 November 1945 as an active station. However, the airfield was gradually run down and was finally sold by the Air Ministry during 1962–63.

== Current use ==
With the end of military control, Eye airfield was converted into an industrial estate with a large factory for processing straw being established in the hangars and former technical site. Later, other industrial development occurred and new buildings were built in the same area. There is a natural gas pumping station in the centre of the former airfield.

The world's first poultry litter-fuelled generating plant was built on the site in 1992. It produces 12.7 MW of power and consumes 140,000 tonnes of chicken litter a year and is owned by Energy Power Resources (EPR).

Many of the old taxiways and runways remain, along with a T-2 hangar and various wartime buildings in various states of repair and use.

== Memorial ==
A memorial dedicated to those who served with the 490th Bombardment Group during World War II was unveiled on 29 May 2016.

== See also ==
- List of former Royal Air Force stations
