= 490th Bombardment Group =

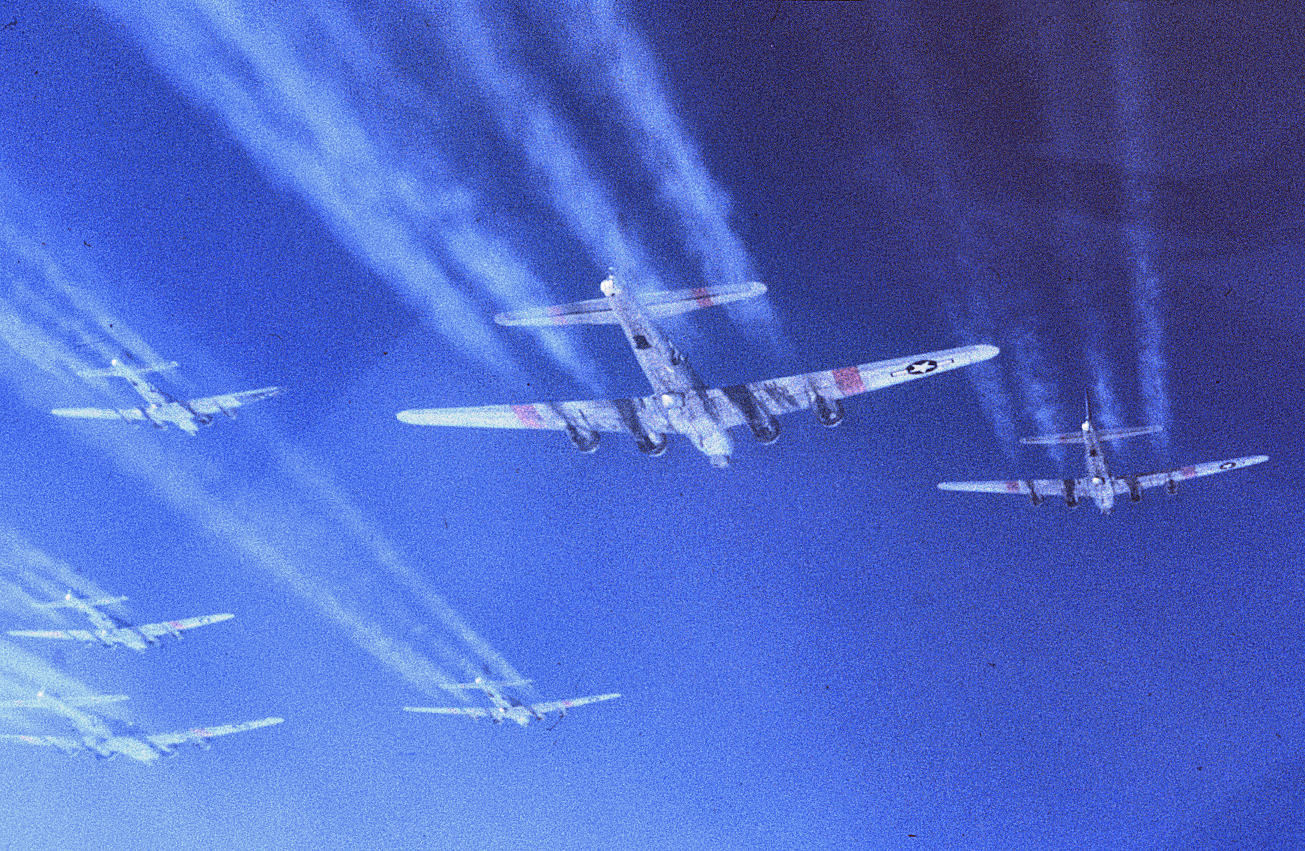
- 490th Bombardment Group B-17G Flying Fortresses in formation during a mission
- Active: 1943–1945
- Country: United States
- Branch: United States Army Air Forces
- Role: Bombardment
- Part of: Eighth Air Force
- Engagements: European Theater of Operations

Insignia
- Tail Code (Note: The square was white on the group's original camouflaged B-24s. Replacements in natural metal displayed a black square. The tail code was replaced by high-visibility red tail markings on group B-24s before the unit converted to B-17s and continued on the Flying Fortresses. Watkins pp. 116–117.): Square T

The 490th Bombardment Group is a former United States Army Air Forces unit. The group was activated in October 1943. After training in the United States, it deployed to the European Theater of Operations and participated in the strategic bombing campaign against Germany from 31 May 1944 to 20 April 1945, losing 22 aircraft while flying more than 5,000 sorties. Following V-E Day, the group returned to the United States, where it was inactivated in November 1945.

== History ==
=== World War II ===
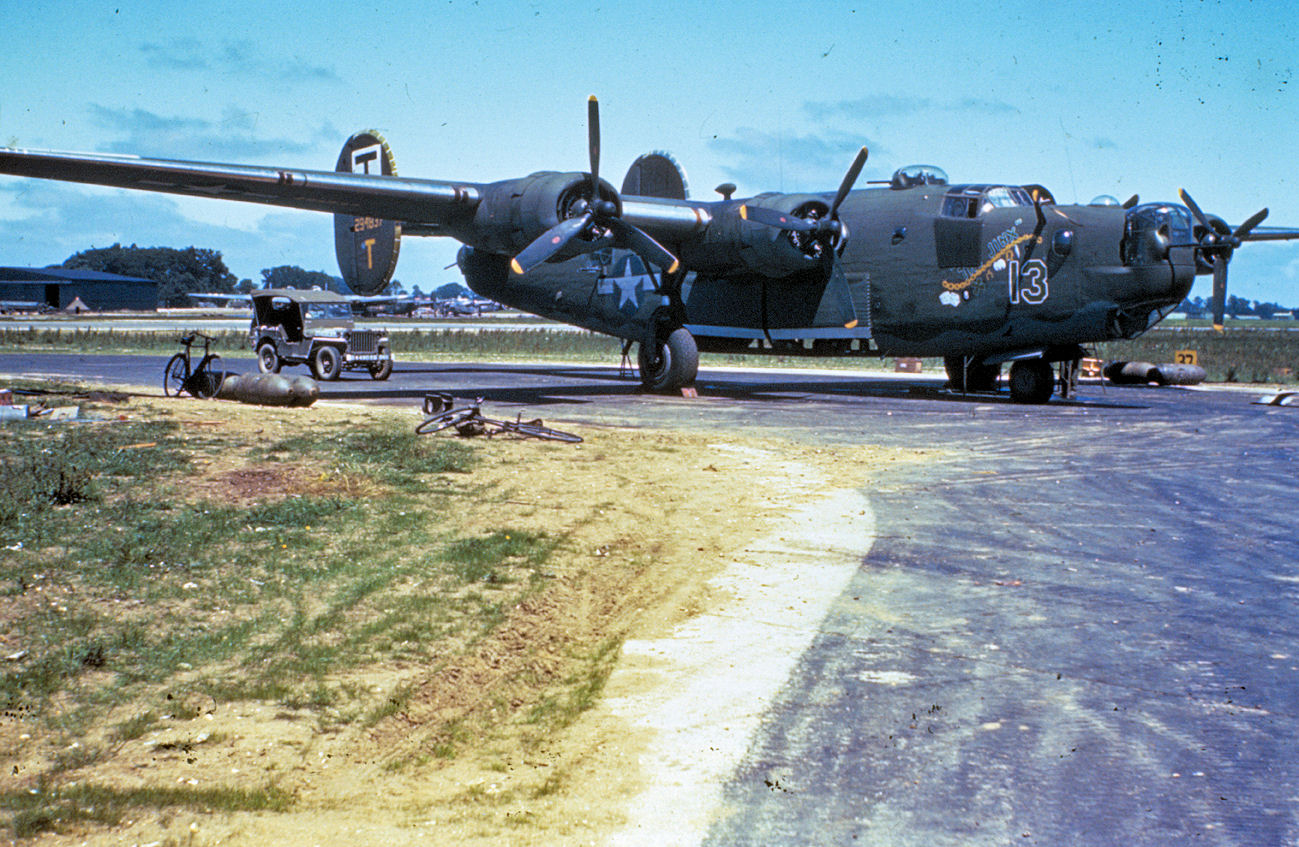
490th Bombardment Group B-24 Liberator

The 490th Bombardment Group was activated at Salt Lake City Army Air Base, Utah on 1 October 1943, with four squadrons, the 848th, 849th, 850th and 851st Bombardment Squadrons assigned. The 848th through 850th Squadrons were activated with the group at Salt Lake City, while the 851st, a former antisubmarine squadron that provided the group's cadre, was located at Mountain Home Army Air Field, Idaho.

In December, group headquarters and the three squadrons at Salt Lake City moved to Mountain Home, where they began training with Consolidated B-24 Liberators. The squadrons left their training base on 9 April 1944 for the European Theater of Operations. The group's ground echelon departed the port of embarkation at Camp Shanks, New York, sailing on the SS Nieuw Amsterdam on 11 April and arriving in the United Kingdom on 25 April. The air echelon flew its planes along the southern ferry route beginning on 12 April.

The group arrived at RAF Eye, its combat station, on 28 April. However, before the group could fly its first combat mission, the 850th Squadron was reassigned to VIII Air Force Composite Command to fly Operation Carpetbagger missions with the 801st Bombardment Group (Provisional). The remaining three squadrons of the group began combat operations on 31 May 1944. The group's initial missions were flown to prepare for Operation Overlord, the invasion of Normandy, as the squadron concentrated on targets in France. It supported the landings on D-Day and attacked coastal defenses, airfields, rail lines and vehicles near the landings. It flew close air support missions to assist British forces near Caen in July and American forces near Brest in September. It was withdrawn from combat on 6 August 1944, to convert to the Boeing B-17 Flying Fortress as the 93d Combat Bombardment Wing transitioned to make the 3d Bombardment Division an all B-17 unit. While the group was transitioning aircraft, the 492d Bombardment Group replaced the 801st Group in the Carpetbagger mission on 12 August. The 850th Squadron transferred its crews and B-24s to the 492d Group, and returned to the 490th on paper to be included in the change to the group's new bomber.

Once transition to the B-17 was completed on 24 August, the squadron concentrated on strategic bombing, attacking oil refineries, airfields, marshalling yards, and factories manufacturing aircraft and armored vehicles. It participated in raids against Berlin, Cologne, Hamburg, Hanover, Kassel, Merseburg and Münster. The 490th flew its first mission with the B-17 on 27 August to Genshagen, Germany to attack the BMW engine factory although the mission was aborted due to weather. On occasion, the squadron was diverted from the strategic bombing campaign. It attacked enemy lines of communication during the Battle of the Bulge from December 1944 through January 1945. In the last month of the war in Europe, it carried out interdiction missions to support advancing ground forces. The squadron's last combat mission was flown on 20 April 1945.

Following V-E Day, the squadron carried food to flooded areas of the Netherlands and transported prisoners of war to Allied repatriation centers. The air echelon began flying its planes back to the United States on 6 July 1945. The ground echelon sailed from Southampton on the RMS Queen Elizabeth on 26 August 1945. The unit regrouped at Drew Field, Florida in September. It was inactivated there on 7 November 1945.

=== Memorial ===
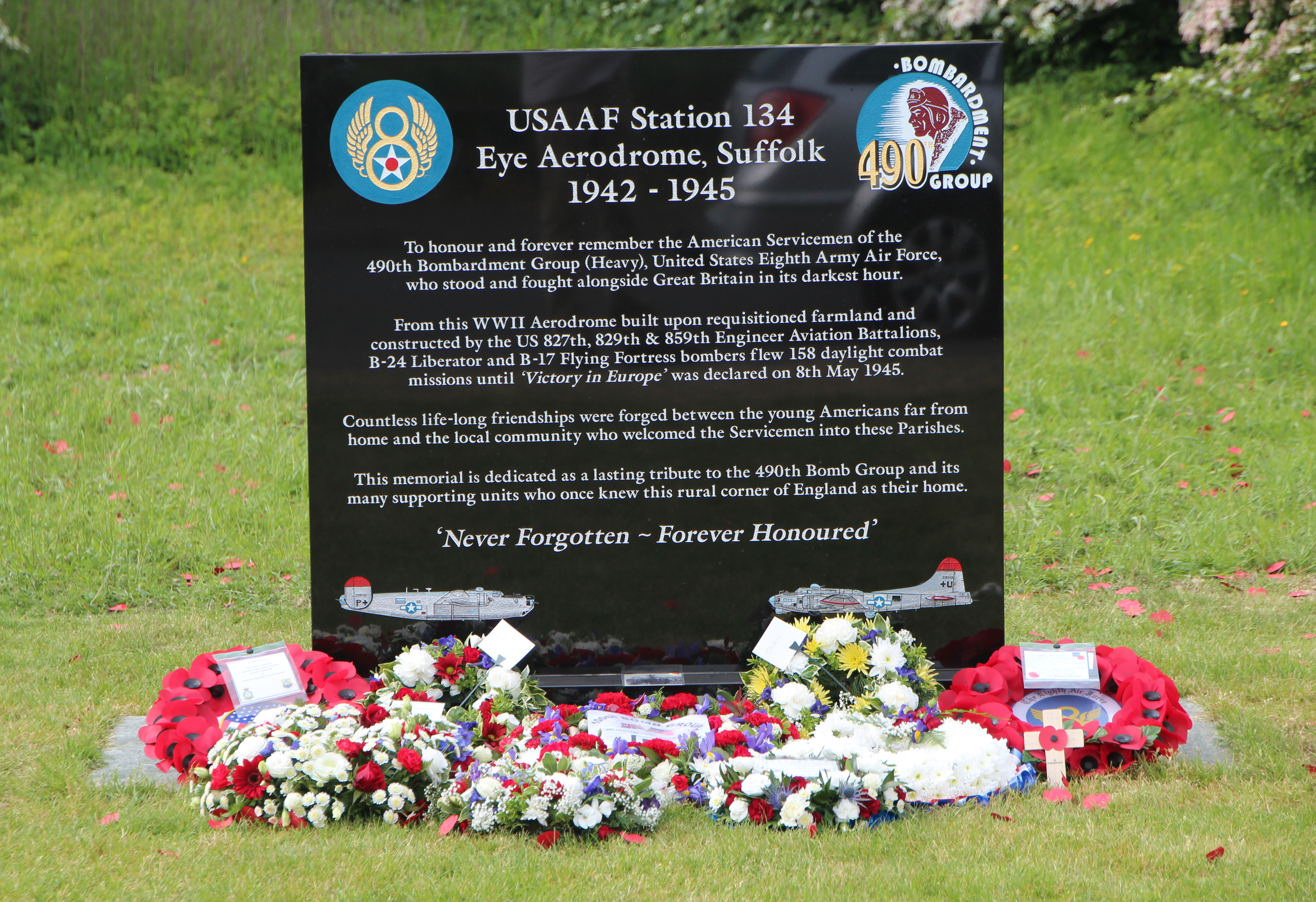
490th Group Memorial

A permanent memorial, situated near the old fuel dump on RAF Eye, was dedicated to the 490th Bombardment Group on 29 May 2016, in front of families of 490th veterans, current serving USAF personnel, and guest of honor, 490th veteran, Si Spiegel. Also present at the unveiling were the family’s of 490th veterans, the local parish priest who blessed the memorial and Niles Schilder who read the poem High flight by John Gillespie Magee Jr.

== Lineage ==
- Constituted as the 490th Bombardment Group (Heavy) on 14 September 1943

Activated on 1 October 1943
Redesignated 490th Bombardment Group, Heavy c. 1944
Inactivated on 7 November 1945

=== Assignments ===
- II Bomber Command, 1 October 1943
- Second Air Force, 6 October 1943
- 93d Combat Bombardment Wing, 7 April 1944
- 13th Combat Bombardment Wing (later 13th Bombardment Wing), March 1945–c. 26 August 1945
- III Bomber Command, 3 September-7 November 1945

=== Components ===
- 848th Bombardment Squadron, 1 October 1943 – 7 November 1945
- 849th Bombardment Squadron, 1 October 1943 – 7 November 1945
- 850th Bombardment Squadron, 1 October 1943 – 11 May 1944, 10 August 1944 – 7 November 1945
- 851st Bombardment Squadron, 1 October 1943 – 7 November 1945

=== Stations ===
- Salt Lake City Army Air Base, Utah, 1 October 1943
- Mountain Home Army Air Field, Idaho, 4 December 1943 – c. 9 April 1944
- RAF Eye (AAF-138), England, 28 April 1944 – c. 26 August 1945
- Drew Field, Florida 3 September–7 November 1945

=== Aircraft ===
- Consolidated B-24 Liberator, 1943–1944
- Boeing B-17 Flying Fortress, 1944–1945

=== Campaigns ===
Campaign Streamer	Campaign	Dates	Notes
	Air Offensive, Europe	28 April 1944 – 5 June 1944	490th Bombardment Group
	Air Combat, EAME Theater	28 April 1944 – 11 May 1945	490th Bombardment Group
	Normandy	6 June 1944 – 24 July 1944	490th Bombardment Group
	Northern France	25 July 1944 – 14 September 1944	490th Bombardment Group
	Rhineland	15 September 1944 – 21 March 1945	490th Bombardment Group
	Ardennes-Alsace	16 December 1944 – 25 January 1945	490th Bombardment Group
	Central Europe	22 March 1944 – 21 May 1945	490th Bombardment Group

== Notable members ==
- Howard Zinn, democratic socialist and historian.
- Ken Kavanaugh, American football player, coach, and scout.

== See also ==
- Media related to 490th Bombardment Group (United States Army Air Forces) at Wikimedia Commons
- B-17 Flying Fortress units of the United States Army Air Forces
- B-24 Liberator units of the United States Army Air Forces
