= SM-68 Titan =

Intercontinental ballistic missiles

The SM-68 Titan (individual variants later designated HGM-25 Titan I and LGM-25 Titan II) was the designation of two intercontinental ballistic missiles developed for the United States Air Force. The Titan I and Titan II missiles were operational between 1962 and 1987 during the Cold War. These missiles, particularly the Titan II, were the basis of the Titan family of space launch vehicles.

Titan was originally built as a backup to the SM-65 Atlas. The Titan I used RP-1 and liquid oxygen propellants and required around fifteen minutes to load the rocket and raise it to a launch position. The more powerful Titan II used nitrogen tetroxide and hydrazine, allowing it to be stored with propellant loaded, giving it a much shorter response time.

== Titan I ==
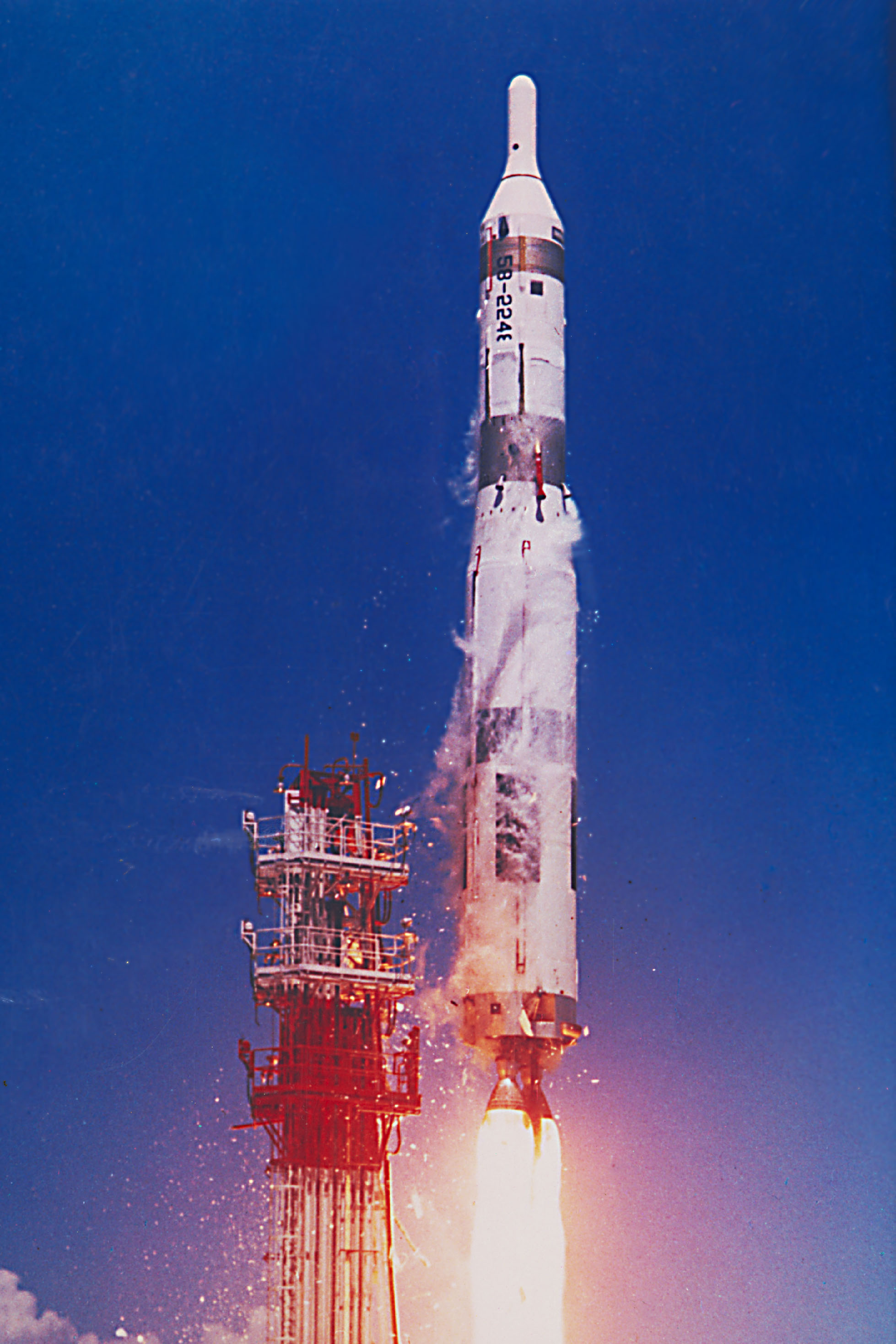
The launch of a Titan I missile

The Titan I was the first version of the Titan family of rockets. It began as a backup ICBM project in case the Atlas was delayed. It was a two-stage rocket propelled by RP-1 and liquid oxygen. Using RP-1 and LOX meant that the Titan I did not have a quick launch sequence. It took about fifteen minutes to load LOX on the first missile at a complex, raise it topside and launch it, with two other missiles following at about eight-minute intervals. Titan I was operational from early 1962 to mid-1965.

Several US Air Force units operated the Titan I:

- 568th Strategic Missile Squadron, Larson AFB, Moses Lake, Washington
- 569th Strategic Missile Squadron, Mountain Home AFB, Mt Home, Idaho
- 851st Strategic Missile Squadron, Beale AFB, Marysville, California
- 850th Strategic Missile Squadron, Ellsworth AFB, Rapid City, South Dakota
- 451st Strategic Missile Wing (formerly 703rd) Lowry AFB, Denver, Colorado

== Titan II ==
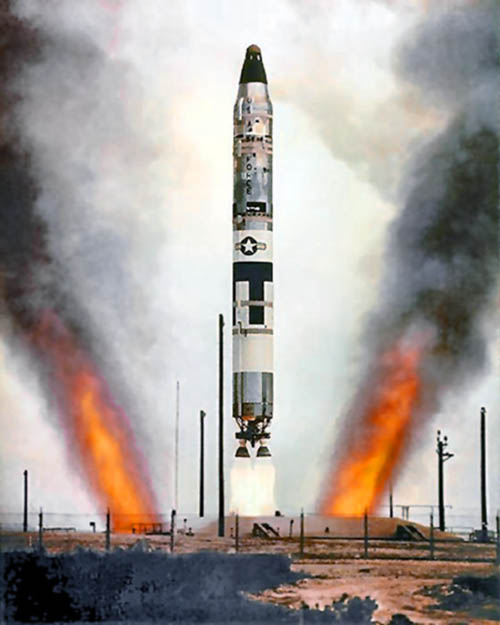
A Titan II emerges from its silo during launch

Most Titan rockets were the Titan II, which could carry a W-53 nuclear warhead with a nine megaton yield, making it the most powerful ICBM on-standby in the US nuclear arsenal. These were deployed in three squadrons of 18 missiles each, in Arizona, Kansas, and Arkansas. All of the ICBM Titan II missile sites have been decommissioned since the retirement of the Titan II as an ICBM in 1987, but the Titan Missile Museum on Interstate 19 south of Tucson, Arizona, has preserved one deactivated launch site. The Titan II was a two-stage ICBM that was used by the US Air Force from the mid-1960s to the mid-1980s. The Titan II used a hypergolic combination of nitrogen tetroxide and hydrazine for propellant. In addition to its use as an ICBM, twelve Titan II missiles were converted to launch Gemini spacecraft for NASA, ten of which were crewed. Following retirement, a further thirteen were converted to the Titan 23G configuration, and used to launch satellites, and the Clementine Lunar probe. The last Titan II launch occurred in 2003.

== See also ==
- Titan III
- Titan IIIB
- Titan 34D
- Titan IV
