= 93rd Combat Bombardment Wing =

93d Bombardment Wing
- Active: 1943 - 1945
- Country: United States
- Branch: United States Army Air Force
- Role: Bombardment (Command & Control)
- Part of: Eighth Air Force

The 93d Bombardment Wing is an inactive United States Air Force unit. Its last assignment was with the Second Air Force, based at Sioux Falls Army Air Field, South Dakota. It was inactivated on 28 August 1945.

The wing was a command and control organization for Eighth Air Force. It had no groups until April 1944. Flew in combat in the European theater from 2 June until 14 August 1944 when its groups were reassigned. Programmed to become B-29 Superfortress Wing in the Pacific Theater, but inactivated before becoming operational.

== History ==
=== Lineage ===
- Constituted as 93d Bombardment Wing (Heavy) on 25 October 1943

Activated on 1 November 1943
Redesignated 93d Combat Bombardment Wing (Heavy) in August 1943
Disbanded on 28 August 1945.

=== Assignments ===
- VIII Bomber Command, 1 November 1943
- 2d Bombardment (later, 3d Air) Division, 22 February 1944 – 18 June 1945
- Second Air Force, c. 27 July-28 August 1945

=== Units assigned ===
- 34th Bombardment Group: April 1944-18 June 1945
- 385th Bombardment Group: 1 January-4 August 1945
- 490th Bombardment Group: 1 January 1945 – 24 August 1945
- 493d Bombardment Group: April 1944-6 August 1945

=== Stations ===
- RAF Horsham St Faith, England, November 1943
- Elveden Hall, England, c. 10 January 1944
- Mendlesham Hall, England, c. 30 March 1944 – 11 July 1945
- Sioux Falls Army Air Field, South Dakota, C. 27 July-28 August 1945.
