= RAF Hethel =

Former RAF station in Norfolk, England

RAF Hethel USAAF Station 114
- Norwich, Norfolk in England
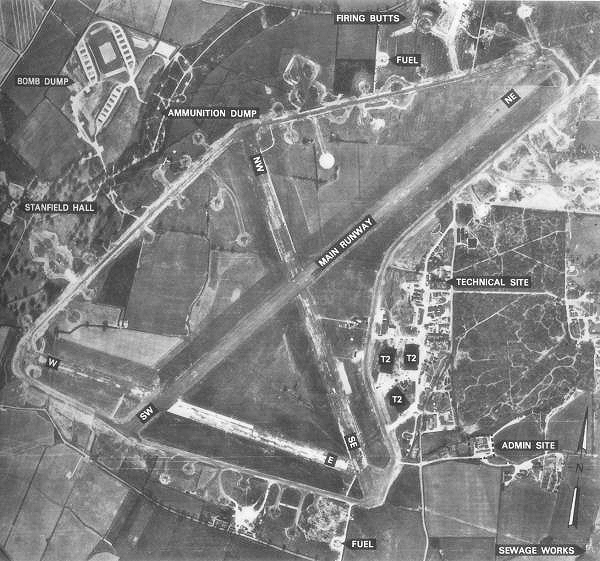
- Aerial Photo of Hethel Airfield - 16 April 1946

Site information
- Type: Royal Air Force station
- Owner: Air Ministry
- Operator: Royal Air Force; United States Army Air Forces
- Controlled by: Eighth Air Force; RAF Fighter Command; RAF Technical Training Command

Location
- Location in Norfolk
- Coordinates: 52°33′52″N 001°10′15″E

Site history
- Built: 1942
- In use: 1943-1948
- Battles/wars: European Theatre of World War II; Air Offensive, Europe July 1942 - May 1945

Garrison information
- Garrison: 320th Bombardment Group; 389th Bombardment Group

Airfield information
Runways
Direction	Length and surface
00/00	1,770 metres (5,807 ft) Concrete
00/00	1,200 metres (3,937 ft) Concrete
00/00	1,200 metres (3,937 ft) Concrete
- Code: HL

Royal Air Force Hethel or more simply RAF Hethel is a former Royal Air Force station (ICAO: EGSK) which was used by both the United States Army Air Forces (USAAF) and the Royal Air Force (RAF) during the Second World War. The airfield is located 7 miles (11 km) south west of Norwich, Norfolk, England and is now owned by Lotus Cars.

== History ==
=== United States Army Air Forces use ===
RAF Hethel was built during 1942 for use by the Americans and was transferred to the USAAF and given designation Station 114.

From 14 September 1943 through to 12 June 1945, RAF Hethel served as headquarters for the 2nd Combat Bombardment Wing of the 2nd Bombardment Division.

USAAF Station Units assigned to RAF Hethel were:

- 463rd Sub-Depot
- 18th Weather Squadron
- 48th Station Complement Squadron
- Headquarters (2nd Combat Bomb Wing)

Regular Army Station Units included:

- 1200th Military Police Company
- 1215th Quartermaster Company
- 1750th Ordnance Supply & Maintenance Company
- 874th Chemical Company (Air Operations)
- 2032nd Engineer Fire Fighting Platoon

==== 320th Bombardment Group (Medium) ====
The 320th Bombardment Group (Medium) was a Twelfth Air Force Martin B-26 Marauder group which arrived at Hethel on 12 September 1942 from Drane Army Airfield, Florida. At the time of their arrival, many of the airfield buildings were still uncompleted. The group used the airfield as a staging and transit point for deploying to La Senia Airfield, Algeria as part of Twelfth Air Force to 2 December 1942.

==== 310th Bombardment Group (Medium) ====
During the spring of 1943 Hethel housed elements of the Twelfth Air Force 310th Bombardment Group (Medium) which also used the airfield as a staging area for deploying from Greenville AAF, South Carolina to Mediouna Airfield, French Morocco.

In addition, the airfield was also used as a training airfield for Consolidated B-24 Liberators by other 2nd Air Division Groups.

==== 389th Bombardment Group (Heavy) ====
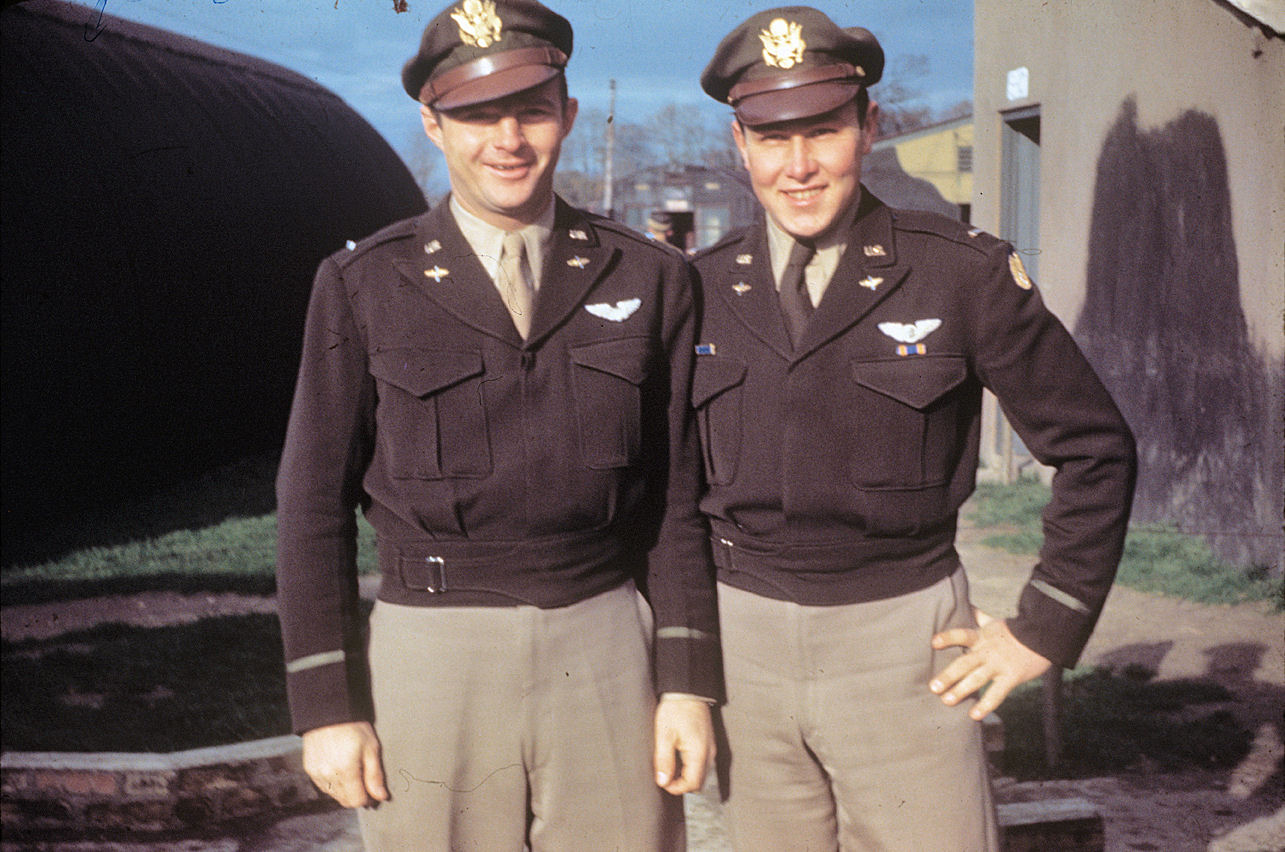
First Lieutenant Lucius R. Ades (Pilot) and Second-Lieutenant Preston G. Redd (Navigator) of the 389th Bomb Group.

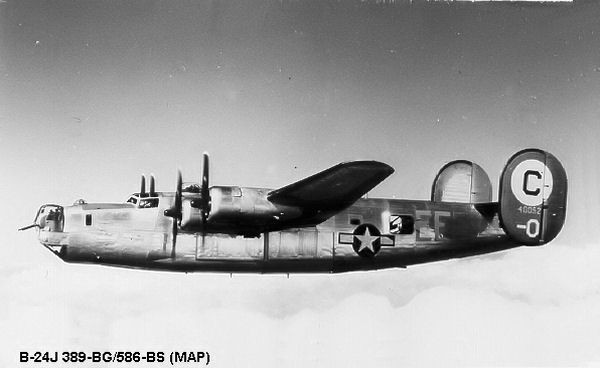
Consolidated B-24J-145-CO Liberator, AAF Ser. No. 44-40052 of the 565th Bombardment Squadron, 389th Bombardment Group.

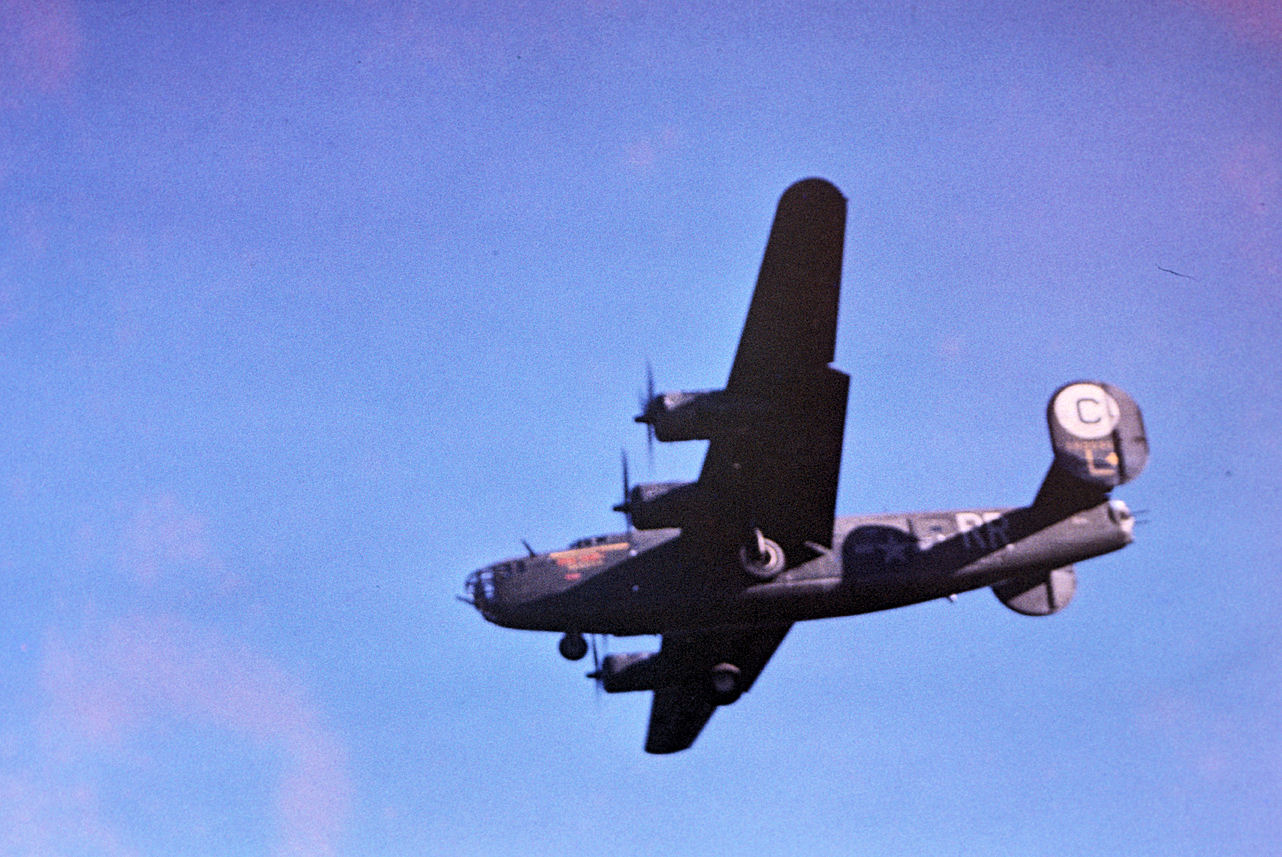
A B-24 Liberator of the 389th Bomb Group returns to RAF Hethel.

With the completion of the facility, Hethel was assigned to the 389th Bombardment Group (Heavy), arriving from Lowry AAF, Colorado on 11 June 1943. The 389th was assigned to the 2nd Combat Bombardment Wing, and the group tail code was a "Circle-C".

Its operational squadrons were:

- 564th Bombardment Squadron (YO)
- 565th Bombardment Squadron (EE)
- 566th Bombardment Squadron (RR)
- 567th Bombardment Squadron (HP)

The group flew Consolidated B-24 Liberators as part of the Eighth Air Force's strategic bombing campaign.

Upon its arrival at Hethel, almost immediately a detachment was sent to Libya, where it began operations on 9 July 1943. The detachment flew missions to Crete, Sicily, Italy, Austria, and Romania. The group received a Distinguished Unit Citation for the detachment's participation in the famed low-level attack against oil refineries at Ploesti on 1 August 1943.

For his action during the same operation, Second Lieutenant Lloyd Herbert Hughes was awarded the Medal of Honor. Refusing to turn back although petrol was streaming from his flak-damaged plane, Lt Hughes flew at low altitude over the blazing target area and bombed the objective. The plane crashed before Hughes could make the forced landing that he attempted after the bomb run.

The detachment returned to England in August and the group flew several missions against airfields in France and the Netherlands.

The unit deployed again temporarily to Tunisia during September and October 1943 with the group supporting Allied operations at Salerno and hit targets in Corsica, Italy, and Austria.

Resumed operations from England in October 1943 the group concentrated primarily on strategic objectives in France, the Low Countries, and Germany. Targets included shipbuilding yards at Vegesack, industrial areas of Berlin, oil facilities at Merseburg, factories at Münster, railroad yards at Sangerhausen, and V-weapon sites in the Pas de Calais. The group participated in the intensive air campaign against the German aircraft industry during Big Week, 20 – 25 February 1944. Also flew support and interdictory missions on several occasions, bombing gun batteries and airfields in support of the Normandy invasion in June 1944, striking enemy positions to aid the breakthrough at Saint-Lô in July 1944, hitting storage depots and communications centres during the Battle of the Bulge (December 1944 − January 1945), and dropping food, ammunition, petrol, and other supplies to troops participating in the airborne assault across the Rhine in March 1945.

The 389th Bomb Group flew its last combat mission late in April 1945. It returned to Charleston AAF, South Carolina on 30 May 1945 and was inactivated on 13 September 1945.

=== RAF Fighter Command use ===
After the departure of the Americans, RAF Hethel airfield was returned to the RAF for use by Fighter Command. Nos 303 and 316 Polish Squadrons arrived on 23 and 15 March, respectively, and both disbanded on 11 December 1946. Nos 302, 308, and 317 Squadrons all arrived on 7 October 1946, and all three squadrons disbanded on 18 December 1946. Some of these squadrons appear to have been flying North American Mustangs.

In mid-1947, RAF Hethel became home to No. 19 Personnel Transit Centre but was transferred to RAF Technical Training Command. With the reduction of the RAF, the station closed on 15 June 1948. For many years the airfield was inactive and abandoned until it was finally sold by the Air Ministry in 1964.

In 1948, the Nissen hut buildings around Marsworth airfield became home to around 900 Polish Displaced People. The camp was run by the National Assistance Board; the Polish camp was closed in 1960/61. There are a number of Polish graves in nearby All Saints Churchyard.

Other Units;

- No. 65 Squadron RAF
- No. 126 Squadron RAF
- No. 131 (Polish) (Fighter) Wing
- No. 4246 Anti-Aircraft Flight RAF Regiment

== Current use ==
For a number of years Nissen hut buildings were used to house many families awaiting re-housing under the post-war building programme. Forehoe & Henstead R D C [Rural District Council?] also used part of the area as a store depot. This would have been during the 1950s era and this was a number of years before the Lotus Factory arrived. With the end of military control, Hethel found a new life in civilian hands becoming the manufacturing and testing site for Lotus Cars. The location of the factory is on the old technical site and the manufacture of vehicles, originally started in the old hangars and workshops, now takes place in several modern buildings. Lotus utilizes parts of the airfield perimeter track and lengths of the main runway as a testing track.

Very little remains of any buildings on the dispersed sites around Hethel Wood; the only thing of real interest being a former gymnasium which became a chapel. On the end wall of this chapel, behind where the altar formerly stood, is a crucifix painted by the American "Bud" Doyle who was assistant to the Roman Catholic chaplain, Father Beck. It was painted in early 1944 and remains in good condition. The chapel has recently undergone extensive restoration carried out by a group of volunteers with the full support of the landowner. The chapel is on private property. The former 2nd Air Division Headquarters at Ketteringham Hall lies just to the north of the airfield. Group Lotus use it for their headquarters.

In June 1946 a memorial plaque was dedicated in Carleton Rode Church, in memory of 17 members of the 389th Bomb Group who were killed in a mid-air collision over the parish on 21 November 1944. A stained glass window in the church is also dedicated to the crew members killed in this collision.

A Memorial Headstone is located in the Hethel Churchyard and the 389th Roll of Honor is housed inside Hethel Church.

== Lotus Cars ==
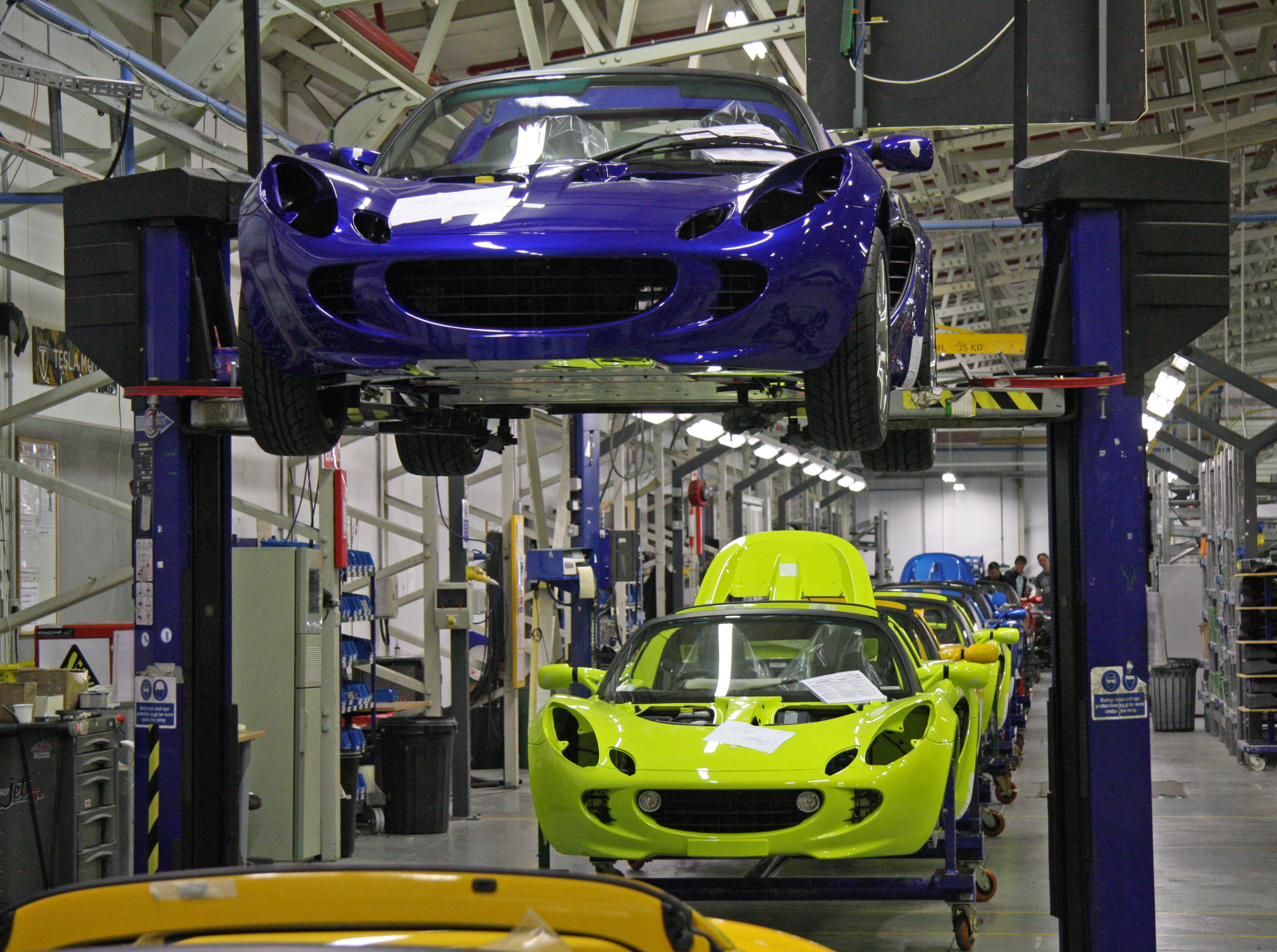
Interior of the Lotus Cars factory at the former Hethel Airfield.

Lotus Cars is a British manufacturer of sports and racing cars. The company designs and builds race and production cars of light weight and high handling characteristics.

In 1966 Lotus Cars moved into a purpose built factory on the site of the airfield and developed portions of the runways and taxiways as a test track for their cars. The factory and engineering centres cover 55 acres (0.22 km^{2}) of the former airfield, and use 2.5 miles (4.0 km) of the former runways. Much of the remaining runways have been removed and used to build roads, and returned to agricultural use. The layout can still be seen from aerial photos.

Today the company also acts as an engineering consultancy, providing engineering development within the automotive industry. The company's racing arm, Lotus Racing, and the Lotus Driving Academy are also located at Hethel.

== See also ==
- List of former Royal Air Force stations
