= Carlsen Air Force Base =

US Army Air Forces WWII airbase on Trinidad

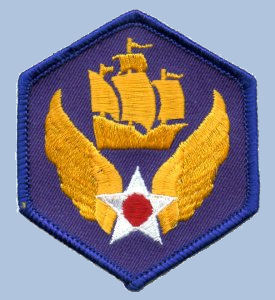
Carlsen Air Force Base
- Part of Sixth Air Force
- Chaguanas, Trinidad and Tobago

Site information
- Type: Military Airfield
- Owner: United States of America
- Controlled by: United States Air Force

Location
- Coordinates: 10°29′15.70″N 061°23′11.68″W

Site history
- Built: 1941
- Built by: US Army Air Force
- In use: 1941-1949
- Demolished: Most of the Airstrip is now used by a Company called National Flour Mills

Carlsen Air Force Base is a former United States Army Air Forces World War II airbase on Trinidad, consisting of two landing strips, "Edinburgh" and "Xeres". The airbase also included an emergency landing strip, "Tobago".

== History ==
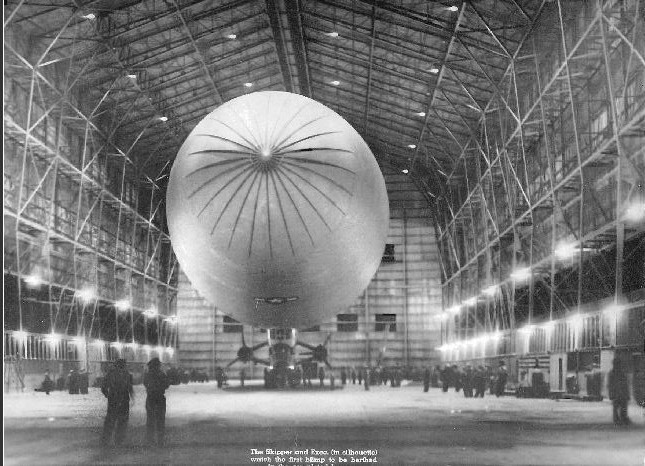
Completed interior view of 80th CB's LTA hangar

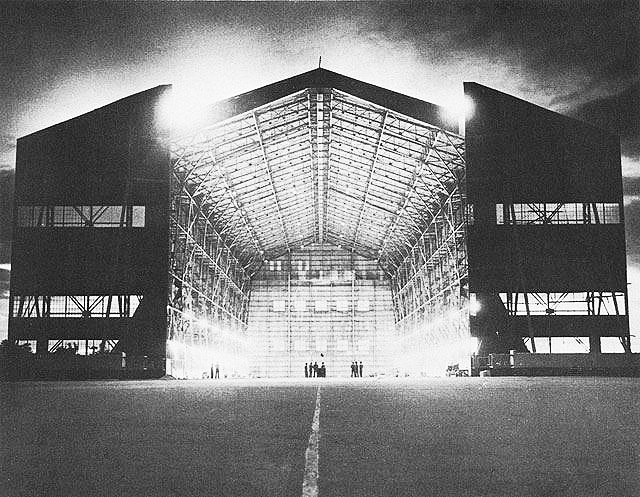
80th LTA Hangar

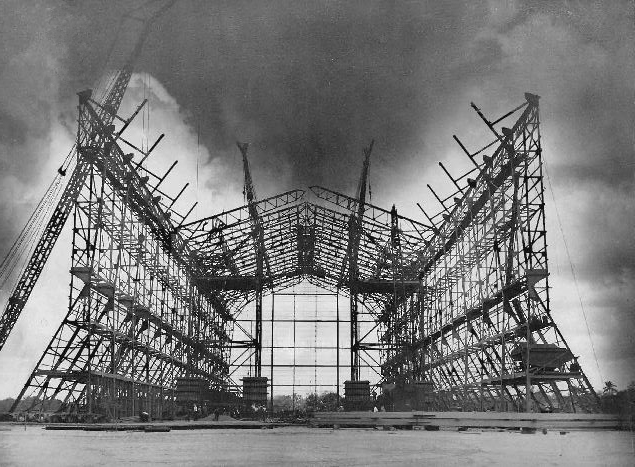
African American Seabees of the 80th CB erecting an Airship Hangar at Carlsen Field Trinidad

The American rights to the airfield and Naval Base Trinidad were obtained via the Destroyers for Bases Agreement in September 1940 when the United States transferred fifty destroyers to Great Britain in exchange for Army and Navy base rights on British possessions in the Americas.

Opened in 1942, Edinburgh Field had been intended solely as an overflow facility for Air Transport Command transport aircraft headed for nearby Waller Field, but eventually, it grew into an enormous sprawling complex with three parallel paved runways – 5000 x 150 ft / 5000 x 150 ft / 2000 x 300 ft and an Airship operating area that made it physically larger than all the other airbases in Trinidad, being used by both Army and Navy aircraft.

Edinburgh Field became the principal combat base for USAAF bombers and Naval airships on Trinidad as well as Navy fighters with a complex of runways and taxiways that surpassed even Waller Field. This lasted until 3 November 1943, when it was renamed Carlsen Field. It was also used by the Royal Air Force and was defended by US Army infantry and AA units. When the Navy began lighter-than-air operations in the Caribbean in the fall of 1943, the 80th Seabees were brought in to build a station at Carlsen Field. To supplement the eight Army-owned buildings taken over by the Navy, the 80th Battalion built a large, steel blimp hangar, a mooring circle, paved runways, a helium-purification plant, and other operational appurtenances.

== Major units assigned ==
- 25th Bombardment Group (Headquarters), 1 November 1942 – 1 August 1943

10th Bombardment Squadron, 1 November 1942-1 October 1943, (B-18 Bolo)
35th Bombardment Squadron, 7 February-24 March 1944, (B-25 Mitchell)
59th Bombardment Squadron, 12 July–October 1943, (B-18 Bolo)
835th Bombardment Squadron, (Attached from 26th Antisubmarine Wing) November 1942 - March 1943 (B-18 Bolo)

Deployed from Miami AAF, Florida

839th Bombardment Squadron, (Attached from 26th Antisubmarine Wing) July–August 1942 (B-18 Bolo)

Deployed from Miami AAF, Florida

851st Bombardment Squadron, (Attached from 26th Antisubmarine Wing) 20 April-20 July 1943 (B-18 Bolo)

Deployed from Imeson Field, Florida

- 1st Bombardment Squadron (9th Bombardment Group), 23 August 1942 – 31 October 1942 (B-18 Bolo)
- 2d Search Attack Squadron (1st Sea-Search Attack Group), 20 September-21 October 1942 (B-18 Bolo)

(Army Air Force Antisubmarine Command)

- 4th Antisubmarine Squadron (Caribbean Sea Frontier), 6–9 October 1942 (B-18 Bolo)

(USAAF unit assigned to United States Navy)

- 23d Antisubmarine Squadron (Trinidad Department, Antilles Air Command), 5 August-24 December 1943 (A-29 Hudson)

Detachment operated from: Zandery Field, Surinam, 15 August-24 December 1943

== Postwar use ==
With the end of World War II Carlsen Airfield was reduced in scope to a skeleton staff. It was placed under the command of the 24th Composite Wing based at Borinquen AFB, Puerto Rico. In 1947 Navy C-47 operations at nearby Waller Air Force Base were moved to Carlsen.

The airfield was redesignated Carlsen Air Force Base on March 26, 1948, by the Department of the Air Force General Order Number 10. Carlsen AFB was turned over to the United States Navy on 28 May 1949 and was renamed NAF (LTA) Carlsen Field. Naval units used the facility until it was formally disestablished on 10 January 1950.

Today the former air and naval airship base has been turned into a dairy and agricultural area south of Chaguanas and is all but unrecognizable. Much of the former airfield area is owned by National Flour Mills and the only remnants of the base are the name of the area in south Chaguanas, along with streets named "Edinburgh" and "Xeres".

The area known as Edinburgh which the runways for the base were located is now the site of a major housing development called Edinburgh 500 . Additional areas in Carlsen field were developed into residential housing developments but the area remains as a site of agricultural activity since the closure of the base.
