= 389th Strategic Missile Wing =

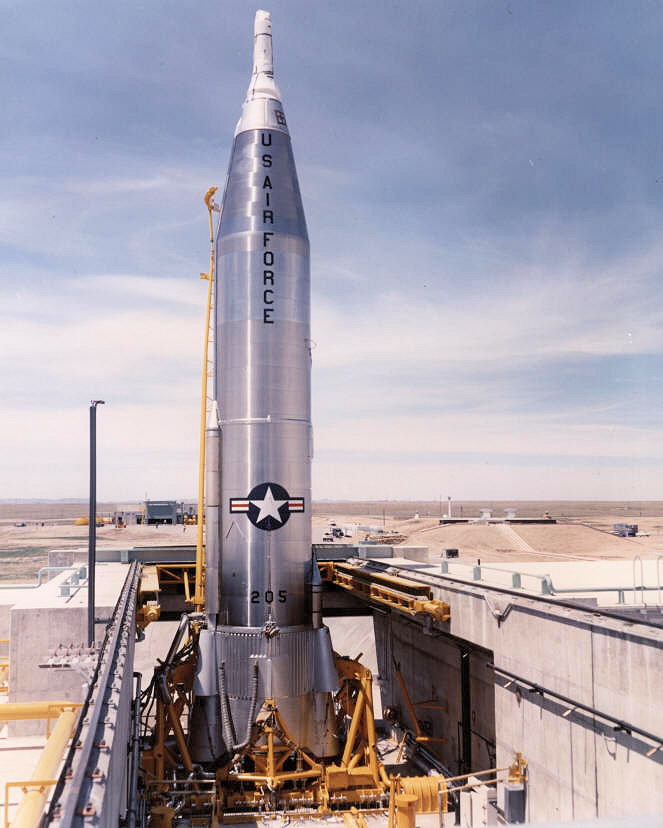
- 564th Strategic Missile Squadron SM-65 Atlas at F.E. Warren AFB
- Active: 1942–1945; 1961–1965
- Country: United States
- Branch: United States Air Force
- Role: Intercontinental ballistic missile operations
- Nickname: Sky Scorpions (World War II)
- Engagements: European Theater of Operations
- Decorations: Distinguished Unit Citation

Insignia
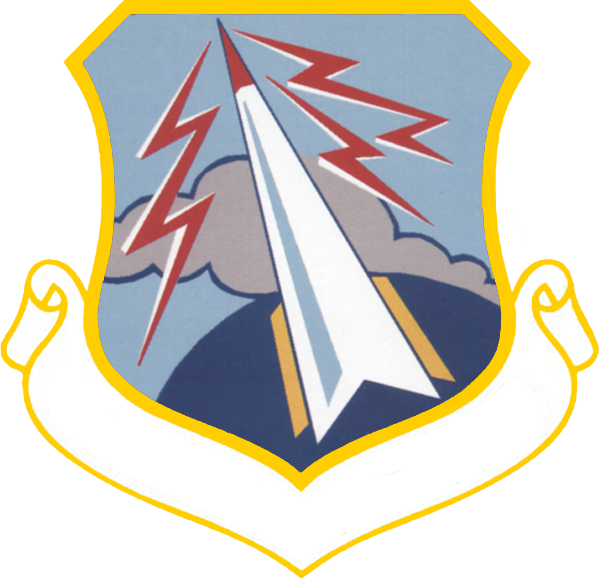
- 389th Strategic Missile Wing emblem (Note: Approved 15 May 1962.)

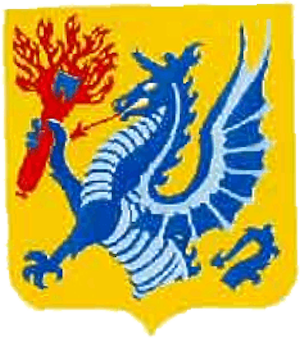
- 389th Bombardment Group emblem
- VIII Bomber Command tail marking: Circle C

The 389th Strategic Missile Wing is an inactive unit of the United States Air Force. Its last assignment was with the 13th Strategic Missile Division at Francis E. Warren Air Force Base, Wyoming, where it was inactivated on 25 March 1965.

The wing was first active during World War II as the 389th Bombardment Group, a Consolidated B-24 Liberator unit that served with VIII Bomber Command in England. The group was stationed at RAF Hethel in early 1943. It was one of three Eighth Air Force B-24 groups that took part in Operation Tidal Wave, the Ploiești Mission of 1 August 1943. For his actions during the Ploiești operation, Second Lieutenant Lloyd Herbert Hughes was awarded the Medal of Honor. The group continued in combat until the surrender of Germany in 1945, then returned to the United States where it was inactivated.

The 389th Strategic Missile Wing was activated in 1961, when it assumed the assets of the inactivating 706th Strategic Missile Wing. It operated Atlas intercontinental ballistics missiles at Warren until they were phased out in 1965. In early 1984, the group and wing were consolidated into a single unit, but have not been active since.

== History ==
=== World War II ===
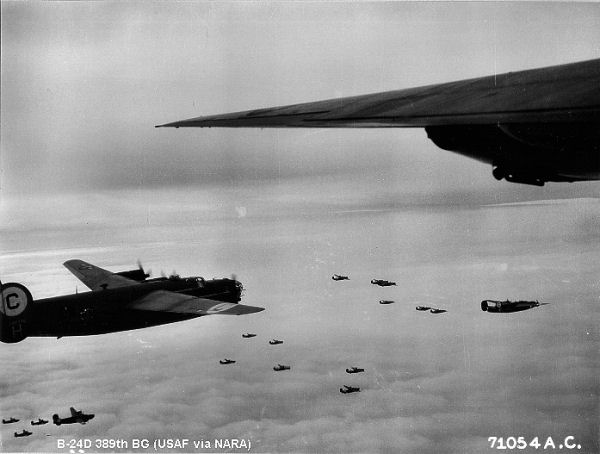
Consolidated B-24 Liberators of the 389th Bomb Group on a mission over enemy-occupied territory.

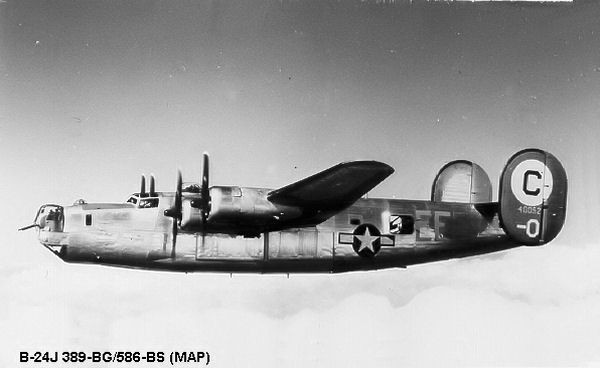
B-24J Liberator of the 565th Bomb Squadron (Note: Aircraft is Consolidated B-24J-145-CO Liberator, serial 44-40052.)

The 389th Bombardment Group (Heavy) was activated on 19 December 1942 at Davis–Monthan Field, Arizona with the 564th, 565th, 566th and 567th Bombardment Squadrons assigned to it. The group prepared for duty overseas with Consolidated B-24 Liberators.

The group moved to RAF Hethel in eastern England in June and July 1943, where it was assigned to Eighth Air Force. The 389th was assigned to the 2nd Combat Bombardment Wing, and the group tail code until high visibility markings were adopted in May 1944 was a "Circle-C".

Upon its arrival at Hethel, the group sent a detachment to Libya, where it began operations on 9 July 1943. The detachment flew missions to Crete, Sicily, Italy, Austria, and Romania. The group received a Distinguished Unit Citation for the detachment's participation in Operation Tidal Wave, the 1943 low-level attack against oil refineries at Ploiești, Rumania on 1 August 1943.

For his action during the Ploiești attack, Second Lieutenant Lloyd Herbert Hughes was awarded the Medal of Honor. Refusing to turn back although gasoline was streaming from his flak-damaged plane, Lt Hughes flew at low altitude over the blazing target area and bombed the objective. His plane crashed before Hughes could make the forced landing that he attempted after the bomb run.

The detachment returned to England in August and the group flew several missions against airfields in France and the Netherlands. The unit deployed again to Tunisia during September and October 1943 to support Allied operations at Salerno during Operation Avalanche. While deployed the unit hit targets in Corsica, Italy, and Austria.

The 389th resumed operations from England in October 1943 the group concentrated primarily on strategic objectives in France, the Low Countries, and Germany. Targets struck by the group included shipyards at Vegesack, industrial areas of Berlin, oil facilities at Merseburg, factories at Münster, rail yards at Sangerhausen, and V-weapon sites in the Pas de Calais. The group participated in the intensive air campaign against the German aircraft industry during Big Week from 20–25 February 1944. It also flew support and air interdiction missions on several occasions, bombing gun batteries and airfields in support of Operation Overlord, the invasion of Normandy, in June 1944. It struck enemy positions to aid the breakthrough at St Lo in July 1944, hit storage depots and communications centers during the Battle of the Bulge from December 1944 – January 1945 and dropped food, ammunition, gasoline, and other supplies to troops participating in the Operation Varsity. the airborne assault across the Rhine in March 1945.

On 7 April 1945, the 389th Bomb Group was one of the targets of the Sonderkommando Elbe, Luftwaffe aerial ramming unit. Two B-24s were destroyed (Note: The aircraft were the formation lead, flown by Col Herboth, the group commander and the deputy formation lead. A third group aircraft was also lost by ramming on this mission.) by Heinrich Rosner in one ramming attack.

The 389th Bomb Group flew its last combat mission late in April 1945. It returned to Charleston Army Air Field, South Carolina on 30 May 1945 and was inactivated there on 13 September 1945.

=== Cold War ===
During the Cold War, the 389th Strategic Missile Wing was organized in 1961 at Francis E. Warren Air Force Base, as a Strategic Air Command intercontinental ballistic missile unit. The unit assumed the mission, personnel and SM-65 Atlas missiles of the 706th Strategic Missile Wing. Two of the wing's World War II squadrons, the 564th and 565th Strategic Missile Squadrons were already stationed at Warren and were transferred from the 706th. The 566th Strategic Missile Squadron, another of the units World War II units, moved to Warren from Offutt Air Force Base, Nebraska, trading places with the 706th wing's 549th Strategic Missile Squadron. (Note: Although the 389th Wing was a new organization, it continued, through temporary bestowal, the history, and honors of the World War II 389th Bombardment Group. This temporary bestowal ended in January 1984, when the wing and group were consolidated into a single unit.)

The wing conducted strategic missile training operations. The Wing was placed on alert during the Cuban Missile Crisis in November 1962. In May 1964, as the Atlas D missiles were being phased out, the 389th Strategic Missile Wing received SAC's last operational readiness inspection for this system. In September 1965, SAC inactivated the wing, completing the phaseout of the Atlas E at Warren.

== Lineage ==
389th Bombardment Group

- Constituted as the 389th Bombardment Group (Heavy) on 19 December 1942

Activated on 24 December 1942
Redesignated 389th Bombardment Group, Heavy on 20 August 1943
Inactivated on 13 September 1945

- Consolidated with the 389th Strategic Missile Wing as the 389th Strategic Missile Wing on 31 January 1984

389th Strategic Missile Wing

- Constituted as the 389th Strategic Missile Wing (ICBM-Atlas) and activated on 26 April 1961 (not organized)

Organized on 1 July 1961
Discontinued and inactivated on 25 March 1965

- Consolidated with the 389th Bombardment Group on 31 January 1984

== Assignments ==
- II Bomber Command: 24 December 1942
- Eighth Air Force: 8 June 1943
- VIII Bomber Command: June 1943
- 2d Bombardment Wing (later 2d Combat Bombardment Wing): 11 June 1943 – 30 May 1945 (attached to 201st Combat Bombardment Wing (Provisional) until 13 September 1943)
- Army Service Forces, Port of Embarkation, 12 June 1945 – 13 September 1945.
- Strategic Air Command, 26 April 1961 (not organized)
- 13th Air (later Strategic Missile) Division, 1 July 1961 – 25 March 1965

== Components ==
- 389th Missile Maintenance Squadron, 1 July 1961 – 25 March 1965
- 389th Support Squadron, 1 July 1961 – 25 March 1965
- 564th Bombardment Squadron (later Strategic Missile Squadron), 24 December 1942 – 13 September 1945; 1 July 1961 – 1 September 1964 (not operational after 3 August 1964)
- 565th Bombardment Squadron (later Strategic Missile Squadron), 24 December 1942 – 13 September 1945; 1 July 1961 – 1 December 1964 (not operational after October 1964
- 566th Bombardment Squadron (later Strategic Missile Squadron), 24 December 1942 – 13 September 1945; 1 July 1961 – 25 March 1965 (not operational after c. 15 February 1965)
- 567th Bombardment Squadron, 24 December 1942 – 13 September 1945

== Stations ==
- Davis–Monthan Field, Arizona, 24 December 1942.
- Biggs Field, Texas, 1 February 1943.
- Lowry Field, Colorado, 19 April – 8 June 1943.
- RAF Hethel (AAF Station 114), England, 11 June 1943 – 30 May 1945.
- Charleston Army Air Field, South Carolina, 12 June – 13 September 1945.
- Francis E. Warren Air Force Base, Wyoming, 1 July 1961 – 25 March 1965.

== Aircraft and missiles ==
- Consolidated B-24 Liberator, 1942–1945
- General Dynamics SM-65D Atlas, 1961–1964
- General Dynamics SM-65E Atlas, 1961–1965

== Awards and campaigns ==
Award streamer	Award	Dates	Notes
	Distinguished Unit Citation	August 1, 1943	389th Bombardment Group, Ploiești

Campaigns and streamers
Campaign Streamer	Campaign	Dates	Notes
	Air Combat, EAME Theater	11 June 1943 – 11 May 1945	389th Bombardment Group
	Air Offensive, Europe	11 June 1943 – 5 June 1944	389th Bombardment Group
	Sicily	11 June 1943 – 17 August 1943	389th Bombardment Group
	Naples-Foggia	18 August 1943 – 21 January 1944	389th Bombardment Group
	Normandy	6 June 1944 – 24 July 1944	389th Bombardment Group
	Northern France	25 July 1944 – 14 September 1944	389th Bombardment Group
	Rhineland	15 September 1944 – 21 March 1945	389th Bombardment Group
	Ardennes-Alsace	16 December 1944 – 25 January 1945	389th Bombardment Group
	Central Europe	22 March 1944 – 21 May 1945	389th Bombardment Group
