= 565th Strategic Missile Squadron =

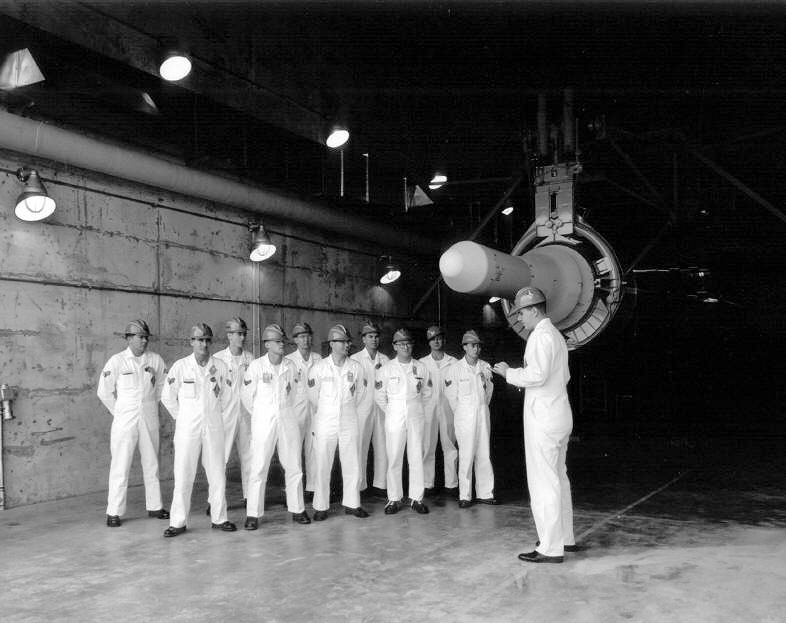
- 565th Strategic Missile Squadron crew at SM-65D Atlas Missile 565-C Pad 2 site, 1961
- Active: 1943–1945; 1947–1949; 1958–1964
- Country: United States
- Branch: United States Air Force
- Type: Squadron
- Role: Intercontinental ballistic missile
- Engagements: European Theater of Operations
- Decorations: Distinguished Unit Citation

Insignia
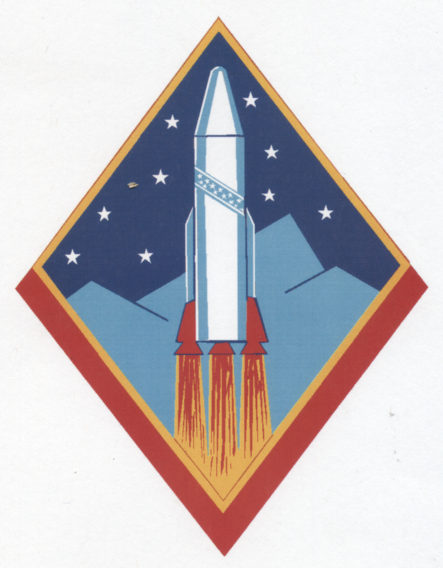
- 565th Strategic Missile Squadron emblem (Note: Approved 20 October 1958. Description: On an Air Force blue lozenge edged Air Force golden yellow and spattered with white stars, a range of light blue mountains issuing from base; overall palewise a white intercontinental ballistic missile shaded light blue speeding upward, its fins red, three rocket motors Air Force blue emitting trails of flame, red, and Air Force golden yellow; encircling the shaft of the missile the light blue SAC ribbon spattered with white stars; outlines and details Air Force blue throughout.)

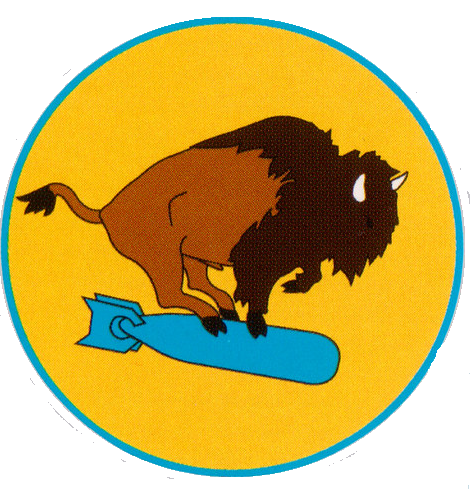
- 565th Bombardment Squadron emblem
- World War II fuselage marking: EE

The 565th Strategic Missile Squadron is an inactive United States Air Force unit. It was last assigned to the 389th Strategic Missile Wing at Francis E. Warren Air Force Base, Wyoming, where it was inactivated on 25 March 1965. The squadron was equipped with SM-65D Atlases and was the second Strategic Air Command Intercontinental ballistic missile squadron to go on nuclear alert status.

The squadron was first activated during World War II as the 565th Bombardment Squadron. After training in the United States, it deployed to England, and participated in the strategic bombing campaign against Germany. Shortly after its arrival in Europe, the squadron sent a detachment to Libya. From this location, the detachment participated in Operation Tidal Wave, the low level attack on oil refineries near Ploesti, for which it was awarded a Distinguished Unit Citation. Following V-E Day, the squadron returned to the United States and was inactivated in September 1945. The squadron was active from 1947 to 1949 in the reserve, but does not appear to have been fully equipped or manned.

== History ==
=== World War II ===
==== Initial activation and training ====
The squadron was first activated as the 565th Bombardment Squadron in late December 1942 at Davis-Monthan Field, Arizona, one of the original four squadrons of the 389th Bombardment Group. A little over a month later, its cadre moved to Biggs Field, Texas, where it began training with the Consolidated B-24 Liberator heavy bomber. The squadron departed the United States for the European Theater of Operations in June 1943. The ground echelon proceeded to the New York Port of Embarkation and Camp Kilmer, New Jersey, sailing on the RMS Queen Elizabeth, reaching the United Kingdom on 6 July. The air echelon began ferrying their Liberators to Europe on 13 June after staging at Sioux City Army Air Base via the North Atlantic ferry route.

==== Combat in Europe ====
By the time the ground echelon arrived at the squadron's combat station, RAF Hethel, the squadron had been called upon to reinforce Ninth Air Force in Africa and had begun its movement to Libya. The advanced echelon of the 389th Group had arrived at Hethel on 11 June and most of the air echelon was in place two weeks later. Personnel were transferred from the 44th and 93d Bombardment Groups to provide the squadron ground support in Libya.

The squadron flew its first combat mission on 9 July 1943, with an attack on Maleme, Crete. It also flew missions to Sicily and other parts of Italy to support Operation Husky, the invasion of Sicily through the middle of July. During the later part of the month the squadron concentrated on training for low-level operations in preparation for the attack on the oil refineries around Ploesti, Romania. Operation Tidal Wave was launched on 1 August 1943, with the squadron forming part of the last group formation to attack. The squadron headed for its target in Campina. This target was the most distant of the refineries being attacked and was assigned to the 389th Group because its B-24Ds were late production models and had a longer range than the planes of the other attacking groups. This refinery was totally destroyed in the attack. The squadron was awarded a Distinguished Unit Citation for this action. Before returning to England, the squadron participated in another long range attack on the Messerschmitt aircraft factory at Wiener Neustadt, Austria on 13 August, which reduced the production of Bf 109s at the factory by a third. The squadron returned to England in the last week of August.

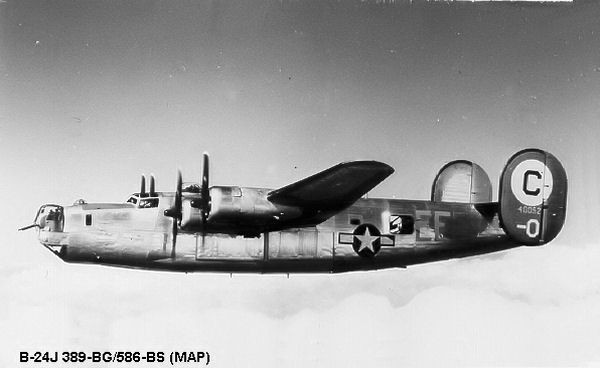
Squadron B-24 (Note: Aircraft is Consolidated B-24J-145-CO Liberator, serial 44-40052, fuselage code EE -O.)

The 565th flew its first combat mission from England on 7 September 1943, when it attacked an air base in the Netherlands. The squadron again deployed to Tunisia during September and October 1943 to support Operation Avalanche, the landings on the Italian mainland at Salerno, striking targets in Corsica, Italy, and Austria. After returning to England, the squadron concentrated on strategic bombing campaign against Germany, with targets including industrial areas of Berlin, oil production plants at Merseburg, and factories at Munster, and shipbuilding facilities at Vegesack. It struck V-1 flying bomb and V-2 rocket launch sites in the Pas de Calais and participated in the strikes against the German aircraft manufacturing industry during Big Week in late February 1944.

The squadron was occasionally diverted from strategic targets to perform air support and interdiction missions. To support Operation Overlord, the invasion of Normandy, it hit airfields and artillery batteries. It struck enemy positions to support Operation Cobra, the breakout at Saint Lo. During the Battle of the Bulge, from December 1944 to January 1945, it attacked storage depots and communications centers. It supported Operation Varsity, the airborne assault across the Rhine by dropping food, ammunition, and other supplies to the ground troops. The squadron flew its last mission on 25 April 1945.

==== Return to the United States and inactivation ====
Following V-E Day, the squadron returned to the United States. The first airplane left Hethel on 20 May 1945 and the ground echelon left England on the SS Cristobal on 30 May. The squadron reformed at Charleston Army Air Field, South Carolina in June for air transport missions, but was not fully manned before inactivating on 13 September 1945.

=== Air reserve ===
The squadron was activated in the reserve at Fairfax Field, Kansas, where it trained under the supervision of Air Defense Command (ADC)'s 4101st AAF Base Unit (Reserve Training) (later 2472d AF Reserve Training Center). It is not clear to what degree the squadron was staffed or equipped. In 1948 Continental Air Command (ConAC) assumed responsibility for managing reserve and Air National Guard units from ADC. President Truman's reduced 1949 defense budget required reductions in the number of units in the Air Force, In addition, ConAC reorganized its reserve units under the wing base organization system in June 1949. The 565th was inactivated and the squadron's personnel and equipment were transferred to elements of the 442d Troop Carrier Wing, which became the reserve organization at Fairfax.

=== Intercontinental ballistic missiles ===
In October 1957, Secretary of Defense Charles E. Wilson established a goal of deployment of four SM-65 Atlas squadrons by 1962. The following month, Francis E. Warren Air Force Base, Wyoming was announced as Strategic Air Command (SAC)'s first intercontinental ballistic missile base. Construction of the first Atlas launch facility at Warren began in June 1958. The squadron was redesignated the 565th Strategic Missile Squadron and activated at Warren on 1 December 1958 and assigned to the 706th Strategic Missile Wing, although it was not operational until the end of January 1959.

However, the Atlas missile itself was still under development and the first successful launch of an Atlas D missile from Cape Canaveral Air Force Station, Florida did not occur until 9 September 1959. In April 1960, the coffin type launcher used by the squadron was successfully tested at Vandenberg Air Force Base, California and declared operationally ready. The squadron was assigned nine missiles, based three missile sites of three missiles at each site. Three launchers and one combined guidance control/launch facility constituted a launch complex, and three dispersed complex locations comprised the squadron. It was the first Atlas squadron with this configuration. On 1 July 1961, the 389th Strategic Missile Wing replaced the 706th and took over its resources. Just over two weeks later, a crew from the squadron launched an Atlas missile at Vandenberg Air Force Base, California in the first successful test of the Army's Nike Zeus missile interceptor program.

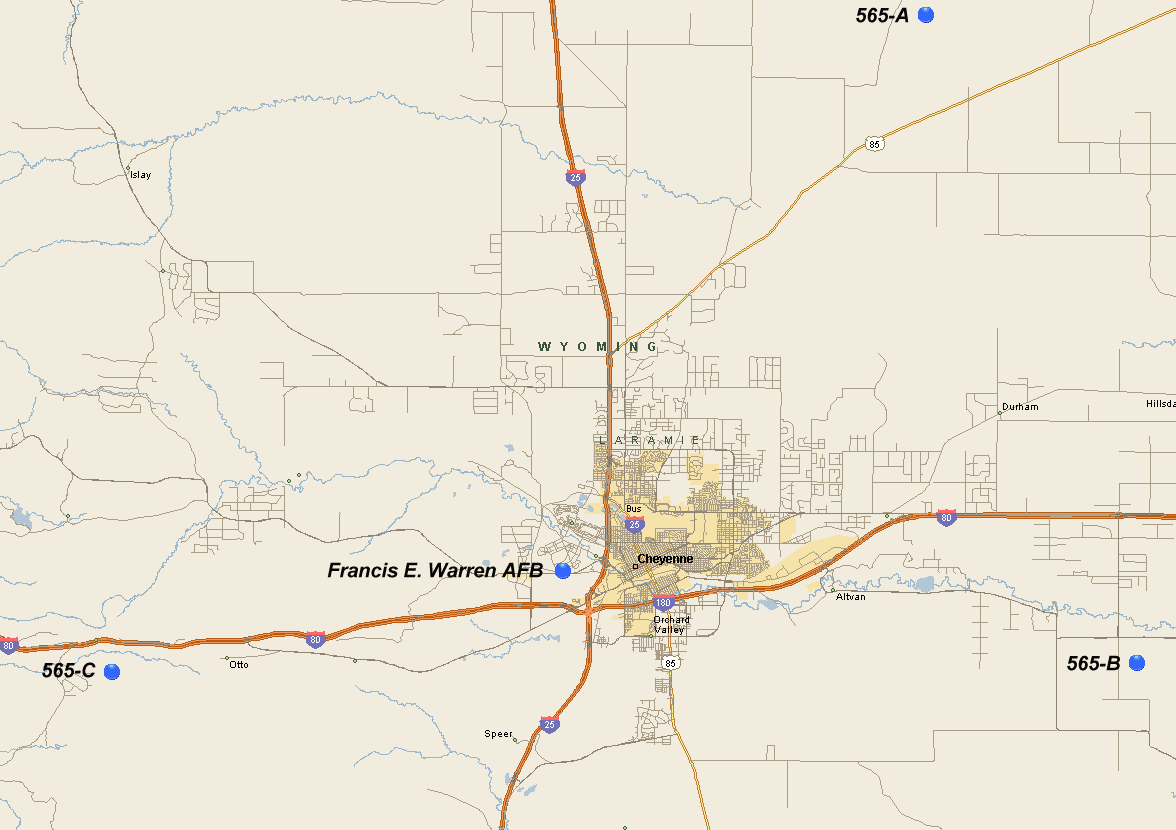
SM-65D Atlas Missile sites

Squadron missile sites were located at:

565-A, 15.1 mi NW of Hillsdale WY 41°23′32″N 104°38′30″W
565-B, 8.2 mi WNW of Carpenter WY 41°05′22″N 104°30′42″W
565-C, 4.8 mi W of Granite Canon WY 41°05′08″N 105°08′45″W

In response to the Cuban Missile Crisis, on 20 October 1962, SAC directed that all Atlas D missiles off alert for modifications be “as covertly as possible” and returned to alert status. Atlas missiles being used for operational readiness training were to be put on alert as soon as liquid oxygen was available. For safety reasons, liquid nitrogen was used rather than liquid oxygen during training. Despite the need for stealth, eventually a priority was established that resulted in the entire production of liquid oxygen in the US being diverted to SAC to bring the missiles to readiness. From 3 November the number of alert missiles was reduced until on 29 November the number was the same as before the crisis. Normal training had resumed on 15 November.

In May 1963, the Air Force determined that all Atlas D missiles would be phased out of its inventory between 1965 and 1968. A year later, Secretary of Defense Robert McNamara directed this program be accelerated and the first Atlas D missile left Warren on 26 May 1964. with the retirement of the Atlas D, the squadron became non operational in October 1964, and was inactivated on 1 December 1964.

== Lineage ==
- Constituted as the 565th Bombardment Squadron (Heavy) on 19 December 1942

Activated on 24 December 1942
Redesignated 565th Bombardment Squadron, Heavy on 4 January 1944
Inactivated on 13 September 1945

- Redesignated 565th Bombardment Squadron, Very Heavy on 25 August 1947

Activated in the reserve on 15 September 1947
Inactivated on 27 June 1949

- Redesignated 565th Strategic Missile Squadron (ICBM-Atlas) on 22 April 1958

Activated on 1 December 1958
Inactivated on 1 December 1964

=== Assignments ===
- 389th Bombardment Group, 24 December 1942 – 13 September 1945
- Second Air Force, 15 September 1947
- Tenth Air Force, 1 July 1948 – 27 June 1949
- 706th Strategic Missile Wing, 1 December 1958
- 389th Strategic Missile Wing, 1 July 1961 – 1 December 1964

=== Stations ===
- Davis-Monthan Field, Arizona, 24 December 1942
- Biggs Field, Texas, 1 February 1943
- Lowry Field, Colorado, 20 April-4 June 1943
- RAF Hethel (AAF-114), England, c. 15 Jun 1943-c. 28 May 1945 (operated from Soluch Airfield, Libya, c. 3 July-27 August 1943; Massicault Airfield, Tunisia, 20 September-3 October 1943)
- Charleston Army Air Field, South Carolina, 12 June-13 September 1945
- Fairfax Field, Kansas, 15 October 1947 – 27 June 1949
- Francis E. Warren Air Force Base, Wyoming, 1 December 1958 – 15 December 1964

=== Aircraft and missiles ===
- Consolidated B-24 Liberator, 1942–1945
- SM-65D Atlas, 1960–1964

=== Awards and campaigns ===
Award streamer	Award	Dates	Notes
	Distinguished Unit Citation	1 August 1943	Ploesti, Romania 565th Bombardment Squadron

Campaign Streamer	Campaign	Dates	Notes
	Air Offensive, Europe	16 June 1943 – 5 June 1944	565th Bombardment Squadron
	Air Combat, EAME Theater	16 June 1943 – 11 May 1945	565th Bombardment Squadron
	Sicily	3 July 1943 – 17 August 1943	565th Bombardment Squadron
	Naples-Foggia	18 August 1943 – 3 October 1943	565th Bombardment Squadron
	Normandy	6 June 1944 – 24 July 1944	565th Bombardment Squadron
	Northern France	25 July 1944 – 14 September 1944	565th Bombardment Squadron
	Rhineland	15 September 1944 – 21 March 1945	565th Bombardment Squadron
	Ardennes-Alsace	16 December 1944 – 25 January 1945	565th Bombardment Squadron
	Central Europe	22 March 1944 – 21 May 1945	565th Bombardment Squadron

== See also ==
- List of United States Air Force missile squadrons
- B-24 Liberator units of the United States Army Air Forces
