= 526th Intercontinental Ballistic Missile Systems Group =

526th ICBM Systems Group
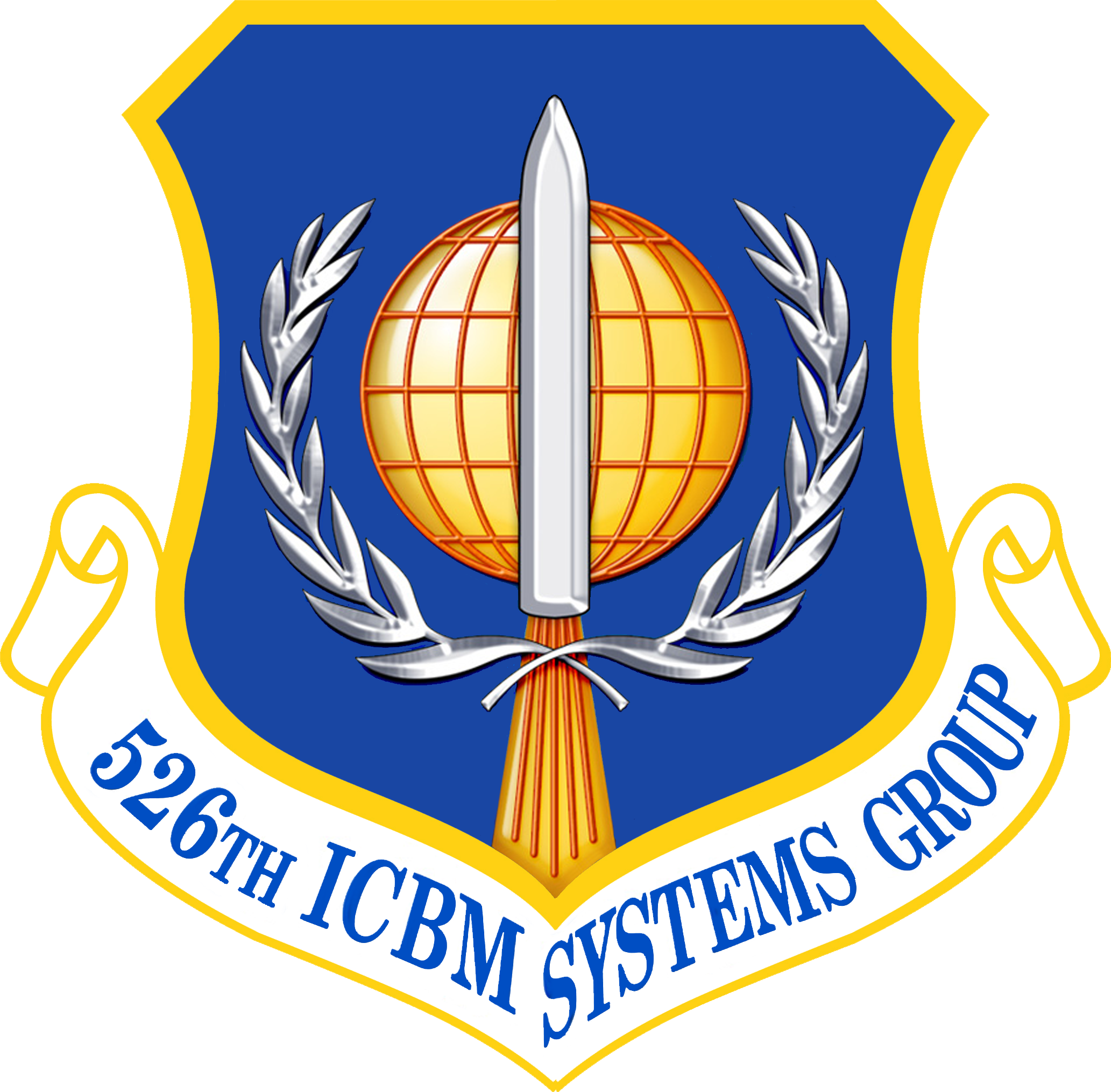
- 526th Intercontinental Ballistic Missile Systems Group emblem
- Active: 1942–1943, 1958–1961, 2005–2010
- Country: United States
- Branch: United States Air Force
- Role: Missile Systems Development
- Engagements: Antisubmarine Campaign

The 526th Intercontinental Ballistic Missile Systems Group is an inactive United States Air Force group. It was last stationed at Hill Air Force Base, Utah, where it was inactivated in 2010. The group was first activated as the 26th Antisubmarine Wing during World War II to conduct anti-submarine warfare in the Caribbean and off the Atlantic seaboard of Georgia and Florida. It was again active during the Cold War as the 706th Strategic Missile Wing, an SM-65 Atlas missile wing. Its final period of service was as a systems and sustainment organization for USAF intercontinental ballistic missiles.

== History ==
=== World War II ===
The group was first activated in 1942 as the 26th Antisubmarine Wing, to supervise Army Air Forces Antisubmarine Command units in the Caribbean and South Atlantic. Its area of jurisdiction ranged from the Georgia/Florida border along the Atlantic Coast outward to approximately 100 miles eastward from coastline to the entire Gulf of Mexico, and Caribbean Sea from the Florida Straits south to the Venezuela coast. As the Army Air Forces turned responsibility for anti-submarine warfare over to the United States Navy in 1943, the wing was transferred to First Air Force and disbanded while its squadrons were transferred and redesignated bombardment squadrons.

=== Cold War ===
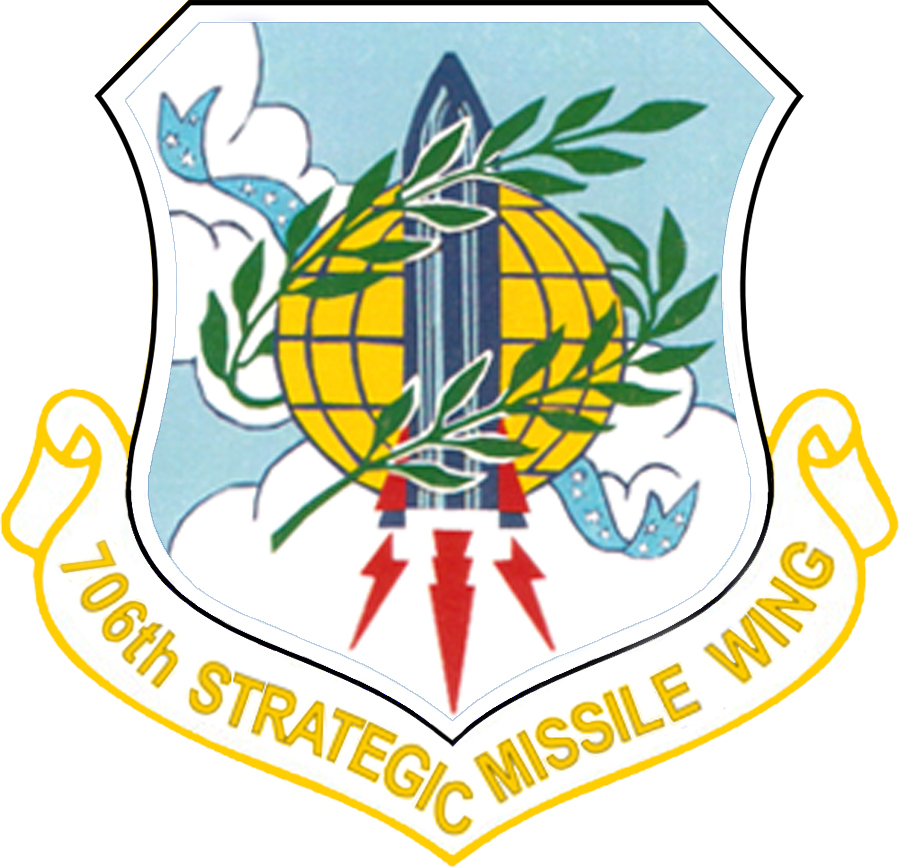
706th Strategic Missile Wing insignia

The 706th Strategic Missile Wing was established on 13 February 1958 at Francis E. Warren AFB, Wyoming. Preparation for intercontinental ballistic missile operations at F.E. Warren began on 15 January 1958 when Air Research and Development Command established the Strategic Missile Wing (Provisional). On 1 February, Strategic Air Command took over F.E. Warren from Air Training Command and replaced the provisional wing with its Major Command controlled 4320th Strategic Wing (Missile). The 4320th was a support organization, and was assigned the 389th Air Base Group to act as the host for units at F.E. Warren.

The 706th replaced the 4320th almost immediately, assuming control of the 389th. Two operational squadrons were activated later that year; the 564th and 565th Strategic Missile Squadrons (SMS). It accepted its first two SM-65 Atlas missile complexes in August 1960, gaining initial operational capability. The same year a third operational squadron, the 549th Strategic Missile Squadron was assigned

The 706th Wing was replaced by the 389th Strategic Missile Wing (ICBM-Atlas) and inactivated on 1 July 1961. The 389th assumed the 706th mission, equipment and personnel, except for the 549th Squadron, which moved to Offutt Air Force Base, Nebraska.

=== Logistics Unit ===
In 1985, the two wings were consolidated as the 526th Special Operations Wing, but the wing was not activated until 2005, when it was activated as the 526th Intercontinental Ballistic Missile Systems Wing. In 2007, the wing was reduced to a group, and was assigned to the 508th Aerospace Sustainment Wing.

The intercontinental ballistic missile (ICBM) System Program Office (SPO) develops, acquires, and supports silo-based ICBMs and provides program direction and logistics support as the single face to the customer. The SPO is responsible for acquisition, systems engineering and depot repair support; manages equipment spares; provides storage and transportation; and, accomplishes modifications and equipment replacement to maintain silo-based ICBM systems. The ICBM Prime Integration Contract Program Management Office, LM(3), is charged with day-to-day execution and management of the PIC. The office is accountable to the System Program Director for cost, schedule, and technical performance of the ICBM prime contractor. LM(3) supports the other SPO divisions by working with LMK-P to translate requirements for engineering services and/or modification/replacement programs into the necessary contracting actions.

== Lineage ==
26th Antisubmarine Wing

- Constituted as 26th Antisubmarine Wing on 17 November 1942

Activated on 20 November 1942

- Disbanded on 15 October 1943
- Reconstituted on 31 July 1985 and consolidated with the 706th Strategic Missile Wing as the 526th Special Operations Wing

706th Strategic Missile Wing

- Constituted as 706th Strategic Missile Wing on 13 February 1958

Activated on 23 February 1958
Redesignated 706th Strategic Missile Wing (ICBM-Atlas) on 1 April 1958

- Discontinued and inactivated on 1 July 1961
- Consolidated on 31 July 1985 with the 26th Antisubmarine Wing as the 526th Special Operations Wing

526th Intercontinental Ballistic Missile Systems Group

- 526th Special Operations Wing formed on 31 July 1985 by consolidation of 26th Antisubmarine Wing and 706th Strategic Missile Wing (not active)
- Redesignated 526th Intercontinental Ballistic Missile Systems Wing on 31 January 2005

Activated on 24 February 2005
Redesignated 526th Intercontinental Ballistic Missile Systems Group on 13 August 2007

- Inactivated on 30 April 2010

=== Assignments ===
- Army Air Forces Antisubmarine Command (later I Bomber Command): 20 November 1942 – 15 October 1943
- 1st Missile Division: 23 February 1958
- Fifteenth Air Force: 15 January 1959
- 13th Air Division: 1 July 1959 – 1 July 1961
- Ogden Air Logistics Center: 24 February 2005
- 508th Aerospace Sustainment Wing: 12 August 2007
- Air Force Nuclear Weapons Center: 30 May 2008 – 30 April 2010

=== Groups ===
- 389th Air Base Group (later 389th Combat Support Group): 23 February 1958 – 1 July 1961
- 389th USAF Hospital (later 389th Medical Group): 23 February 1958 – 1 July 1961
- 526th Acquisition Group: 24 February 2005 – 13 August 2007
- 526th Flight Systems Sustainment Group: 24 February 2005 – 28 April 2006
- 526th Ground Systems Sustainment Group (later 526th Intercontinental Ballistic Missile Systems Sustainment Group): 24 February 2005 – 13 August 2007
- 556th Intercontinental Ballistic Missile Systems Sustainment Group: 28 April 2006 – 13 August 2007
- 826th Intercontinental Ballistic Missile Systems Group: 28 April 2006 – 13 August 2007

==== Squadrons ====
- 7th Antisubmarine Squadron (later 851st Bombardment Squadron): 8 December 1942 – 1 October 1943 (detached to 25th Antisubmarine Wing c. 16 December 1942 – 20 April 1943 and to 25th Bombardment Group 20 April 1943 – 20 July 1943)

Stationed at Jacksonville Army Air Field, Florida, operated from: Edinburgh Field, Trinidad

- 9th Antisubmarine Squadron: 8 December 1942 – 23 September 1943 (detached to 25th Bombardment Group until March 1943)

Stationed at Miami Army Air Field, Florida, operated from: Edinburgh Field, Trinidad

- 10th Antisubmarine Squadron: 22 November 1942 – 15 October 1943
- 15th Antisubmarine Squadron: 17 December 1942 – 15 October 1942

Stationed at Jacksonville Army Air Field, Florida, operated from: Drew Field, Florida and Batista Field, Cuba

- 17th Antisubmarine Squadron (later 855th Bombardment Squadron): 14 December 1942 – 1 October 1943

Stationed at Palm Beach County Park (Lantana Airport), Florida, operated from: NAS Key West, Florida and Miami Army Air Field, Florida

- 25th Antisubmarine Squadron: 1 May 1943 – 9 October 1943

Stationed at Jacksonville Army Air Field, Florida

- 76th Bombardment Squadron (later 23d Antisubmarine Squadron): attached 20 November 1942 – 9 March 1943, assigned 9 March 1943 – 15 October 1943 (detached to Trinidad Detachment, Antilles Air Command after 5 August 1943)

Operated from Imeson Field, Florida, Opalocka NAS, Florida Drew Field, Florida and Batista Field, Cuba
Stationed at Drew Field, Florida, operated from Langley Field, Virginia
Stationed at Edinburgh Field, Trinidad (Ground echelon remained at Drew Field until 15 October 1943)
Detachment of air echelon operated from Zandery Field, Surinam, 15 August— December 1943

- 79th Bombardment Squadron (later 8th Antisubmarine Squadron): 22 November 1942 – 14 October 1943 (attached to 25th Bombardment Group July – August 1943)
- 124th Observation Squadron: attached 20 November 1942 – 4 January 1943
- 500th Intercontinental Ballistic Missile Systems Sustainment Squadron: 13 August 2007 – 30 April 2010
- 509th Intercontinental Ballistic Missile Systems Squadron: 13 August 2007 – 30 April 2010
- 510th Intercontinental Ballistic Missile Systems Squadron: 13 August 2007 – 30 April 2010
- 511th Intercontinental Ballistic Missile Systems Squadron: 13 August 2007 – 30 April 2010
- 549th Strategic Missile Squadron: 1 October 1960 – 1 July 1961
- 564th Strategic Missile Squadron: 1 July 1958 – 1 July 1961
- 565th Strategic Missile Squadron: 1 December 1958 – 1 July 1961
- 706th Support Squadron (later 706th Missile Maintenance Squadron): 1 February 1959 – 1 July 1961

=== Stations ===
- Miami Army Air Field, Florida: 20 November 1942 – 15 October 1943
- F.E. Warren Air Force Base, Wyoming: 23 February 1958 – 1 July 1961
- Hill Air Force Base, Utah: 24 February 2005 – present

=== ICBM Supported ===
- LGM-30 Minuteman (24 February 2005 – present)
- LGM-118A Peacekeeper (c. 2005)
