= 567th Strategic Missile Squadron =

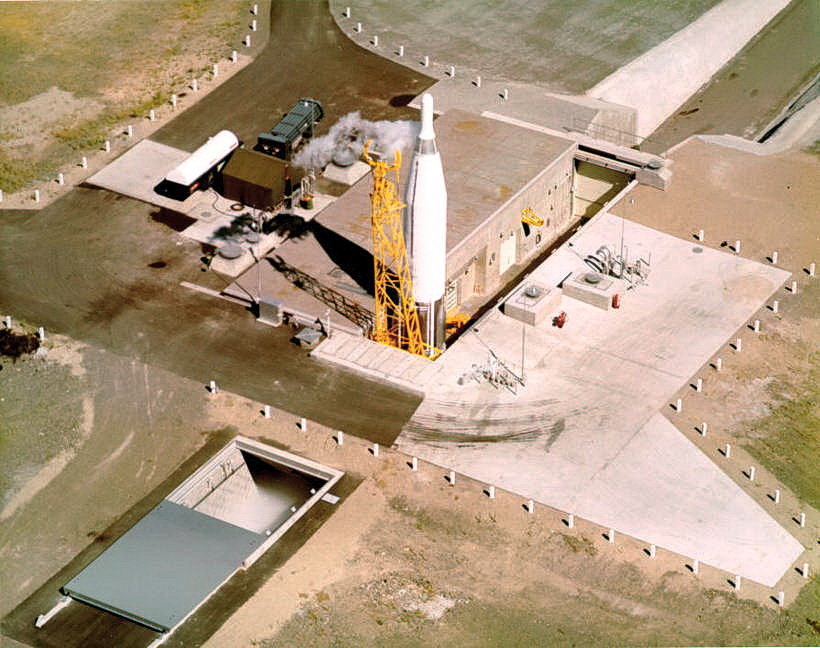
- Squadron SM-65E Atlas at Site 567-1
- Active: 1943–1945; 1947–1949; 1959–1965
- Country: United States
- Branch: United States Air Force
- Type: Squadron
- Role: Intercontinental ballistic missile
- Motto: Sentinels for Peace (1961-1965)
- Engagements: European Theater of Operations
- Decorations: Distinguished Unit Citation; Air Force Outstanding Unit Award

Insignia
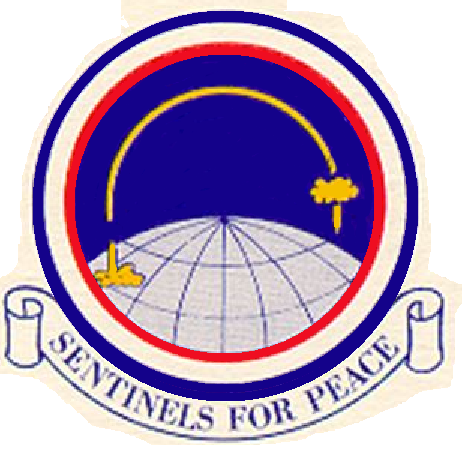
- 567th Strategic Missile Squadron emblem (Note: Approved 29 November 1961. Description: On an Air Force blue disc bordered red, white, and blue the top of a globe issuing from base, light blue, grid lines Air Force blue, above the globe an arched missile trajectory path between in dexter surmounting the globe, a missile at take-off leaving a cloud of exhaust and above the globe in sinister a missile dropping to earth leaving a nuclear cloud, all Air Force golden yellow.)

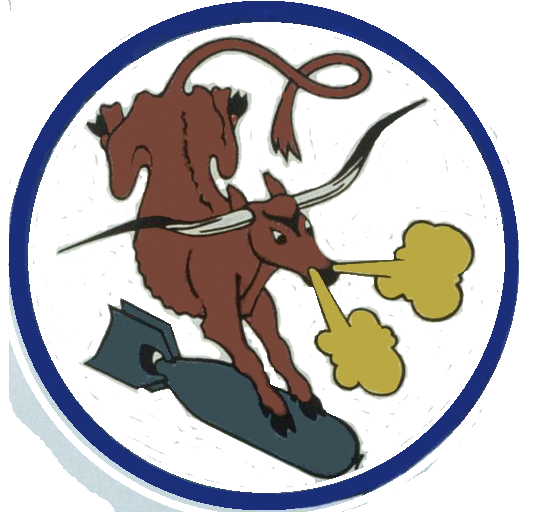
- 567th Bombardment Squadron emblem
- World War II fuselage marking: HP

The 567th Strategic Missile Squadron is an inactive United States Air Force unit. It was last assigned to the 92d Strategic Aerospace Wing at Fairchild Air Force Base, Washington, where it was inactivated as part of the phaseout of the Atlas ICBM on 25 June 1965. It was equipped with the SM-65E Atlas ICBM, with a mission of nuclear deterrence.

The squadron was first activated during World War II as the 567th Bombardment Squadron. After training in the United States, it deployed to England, and participated in the strategic bombing campaign against Germany. Shortly after its arrival in Europe, the squadron sent a detachment to Libya. From this location, the detachment participated in Operation Tidal Wave, the low level attack on oil refineries near Ploesti, for which it was awarded a Distinguished Unit Citation. Following V-E Day, the squadron returned to the United States and was inactivated in September 1945. The squadron was active from 1947 to 1949 in the reserve, but does not appear to have been fully equipped or manned.

== History ==
=== World War II ===
==== Initial activation and training ====
The squadron was first activated as the 567th Bombardment Squadron in late December 1942 at Davis-Monthan Field, Arizona, one of the original four squadrons of the 389th Bombardment Group. A little over a month later, its cadre moved to Biggs Field, Texas, where it began training with the Consolidated B-24 Liberator heavy bomber. The squadron departed the United States for the European Theater of Operations in June 1943. The ground echelon proceeded to the New York Port of Embarkation and Camp Kilmer, New Jersey, sailing on the RMS Queen Elizabeth, reaching the United Kingdom on 6 July. The air echelon began ferrying their Liberators to Europe on 13 June after staging at Sioux City Army Air Base via the North Atlantic ferry route.

==== Combat in Europe ====
By the time the ground echelon arrived at the squadron's combat station, RAF Hethel, the squadron had been called upon to reinforce Ninth Air Force in Africa and had begun its movement to Libya. The advanced echelon of the 389th Group had arrived at Hethel on 11 June and most of the air echelon was in place two weeks later. Personnel were transferred from the 44th and 93d Bombardment Groups to provide the squadron ground support in Libya.

The squadron flew its first combat mission on 9 July 1943, with an attack on Maleme, Crete. It also flew missions to Sicily and other parts of Italy to support Operation Husky, the invasion of Sicily through the middle of July. During the later part of the month the squadron concentrated on training for low-level operations in preparation for the attack on the oil refineries around Ploesti, Romania. Operation Tidal Wave was launched on 1 August 1943, with the squadron forming part of the last group formation to attack. The squadron headed for its target in Campina. This target was the most distant of the refineries being attacked and was assigned to the 389th Group because its B-24Ds were late production models and had a longer range than the planes of the other attacking groups. This refinery was totally destroyed in the attack. The squadron was awarded a Distinguished Unit Citation for this action. Before returning to England, the squadron participated in another long range attack on the Messerschmitt aircraft factory at Wiener Neustadt, Austria on 13 August, which reduced the production of Bf 109s at the factory by a third. The squadron returned to England in the last week of August.

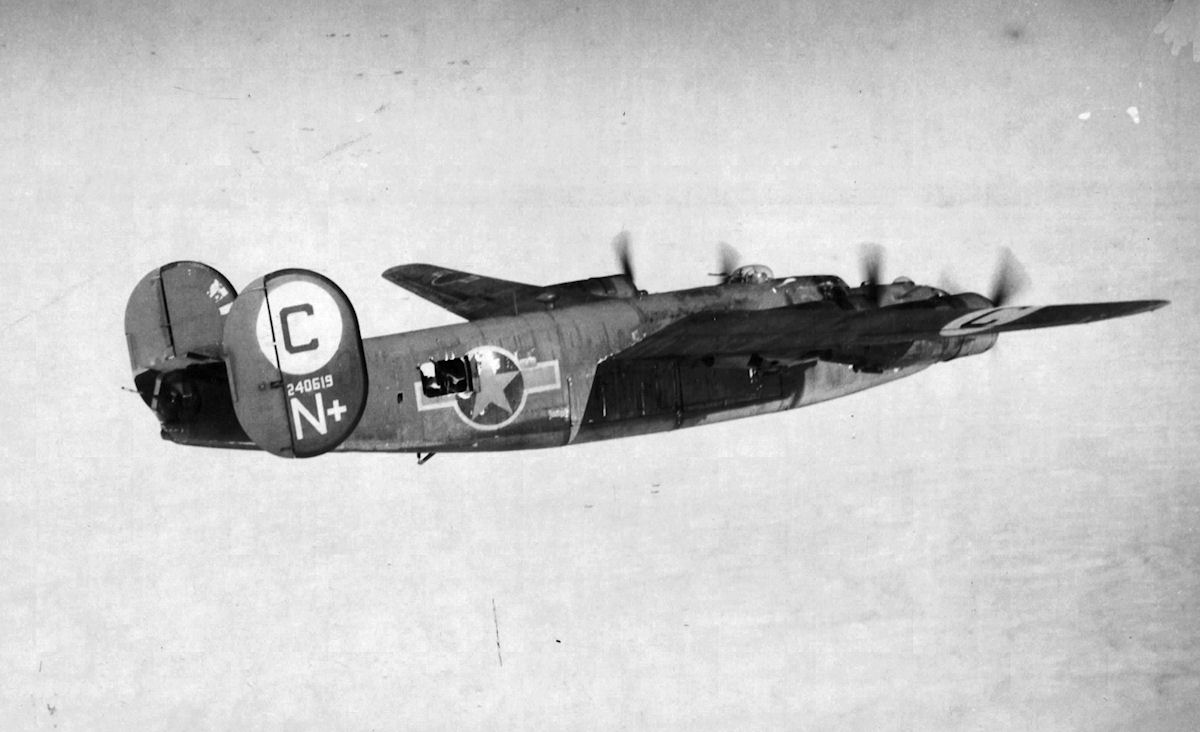
Squadron B-24 Liberator (Note: Aircraft is Convair B-24D-80-CO Liberator, serial 42-40619. This plane was lost on the 24 February 1944 mission to Gotha, Germany during Big Week. Three crewmembers were killed in action, seven became prisoners of war. Baugher, Joe (28 December 2022). "1942 USAF Serial Numbers". Joe Baugher. Missing Air Crew Report 2938.)

The 567th flew its first combat mission from England on 7 September 1943, when it attacked an air base in the Netherlands. The squadron again deployed to Tunisia during September and October 1943 to support Operation Avalanche, the landings on the Italian mainland at Salerno, striking targets in Corsica, Italy, and Austria. After returning to England, the squadron concentrated on strategic bombing campaign against Germany, with targets including industrial areas of Berlin, oil production plants at Merseburg, and factories at Munster, and shipbuilding facilities at Vegesack. It struck V-1 flying bomb and V-2 rocket launch sites in the Pas de Calais and participated in the strikes against the German aircraft manufacturing industry during Big Week in late February 1944.

The squadron was occasionally diverted from strategic targets to perform air support and interdiction missions. To support Operation Overlord, the invasion of Normandy, it hit airfields and artillery batteries. It struck enemy positions to support Operation Cobra, the breakout at Saint Lo. During the Battle of the Bulge, from December 1944 to January 1945, it attacked storage depots and communications centers. It supported Operation Varsity, the airborne assault across the Rhine by dropping food, ammunition, and other supplies to the ground troops. The squadron flew its last mission on 25 April 1945.

==== Return to the United States and inactivation ====
Following V-E Day, the squadron returned to the United States. The first airplane left Hethel on 20 May 1945 and the ground echelon left England on the SS Cristobal on 30 May. The squadron reformed at Charleston Army Air Field, South Carolina in June for air transport missions, but was not fully manned before inactivating on 13 September 1945.

=== Air reserve ===
The squadron was activated in the reserve at Coffeyville Municipal Airport, Kansas, where it trained under the supervision of Air Defense Command (ADC). It is not clear to what degree the squadron was staffed or equipped. In 1948 Continental Air Command (ConAC) assumed responsibility for managing reserve and Air National Guard units from ADC. President Truman’s reduced 1949 defense budget required reductions in the number of units in the Air Force, The 567th was inactivated in June 1949 as reserve flying operations at Coffeyville came to an end.

=== Intercontinental ballistic missiles ===
The squadron was redesignated the 567th Strategic Missile Squadron and organized at Fairchild Air Force Base, Washington on 1 April 1960, where it was assigned to the 92d Bombardment Wing. The squadron was the first SM-65E Atlas unit to activate. Construction of the squadron's launch sites had already began on 12 May 1959. During missile installation and checkout, General Dynamics awarded the squadron a trophy for its safety record. Although the first missile arrived at Fairchild on 3 December 1960, construction of the squadron's launch sites was not completed until 10 February 1961 and the squadron's first launch complex was accepted by Strategic Air Command (SAC) on 29 July 1961. Squadron operational readiness training began in August and the unit was the first to conduct this training at its own sites, rather than at Vandenberg Air Force Base, California. On 1 October 1961, the first squadron missile went on alert. The bulk of the Fairchild force went on alert status in November, although some missiles were still used for training.

The squadron was assigned nine missiles, based in nine independent launch sites. The major improvement in the Atlas E was the new all-inertial system that obviated the need for ground control facilities. Since the missiles were no longer tied to a central guidance control facility, the launchers could be dispersed widely.

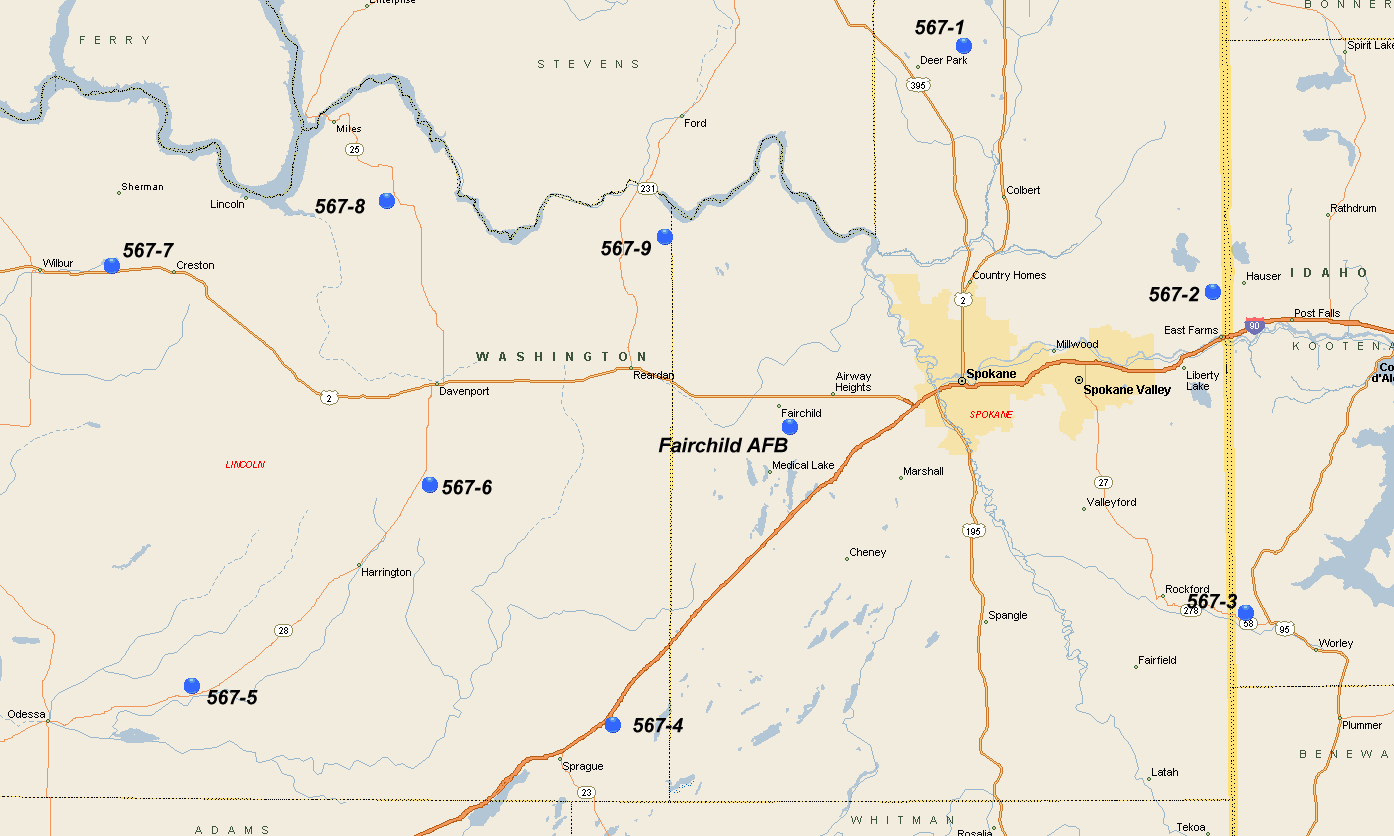
SM-65E Atlas Missile Sites

Squadron missile sites:

567–1, 3.4 mi ENE of Deer Park, WA 47°58′30″N 117°24′32″W
567–2, 3.1 mi SE of Newman Lake, WA 47°44′25″N 117°03′38″W
567–3, 5.3 mi ESE of Rockford, WA 47°26′13″N 117°01′06″W
567–4, 4.0 mi NE of Sprague, WA 47°19′58″N 117°54′11″W
567–5, 0.7 mi NW of Lamona, WA 47°22′04″N 118°29′27″W
567–6, 6.5 mi S of Davenport, WA 47°33′36″N 118°09′34″W
567–7, 4.4 mi E of Wilbur, WA 47°45′52″N 118°36′31″W
567–8, 6.2 mi SW of Deer Meadows, WA 47°49′40″N 118°13′21″W
567–9, 8.9 mi NNE of Reardan, WA 47°47′42″N 117°49′51″W

In response to the Cuban Missile Crisis, on 20 October 1962, SAC directed that all Atlas E missiles off alert for modifications be “as covertly as possible” and returned to alert status. Atlas missiles being used for operational readiness training were to be put on alert as soon as liquid oxygen was available. For safety reasons, liquid nitrogen was used rather than liquid oxygen during training. Despite the need for stealth, eventually a priority was established that resulted in the entire production of liquid oxygen in the US being diverted to SAC to bring the missiles to readiness. From 3 November the number of alert missiles was reduced until on 29 November the number was the same as before the crisis. Normal training had resumed on 15 November.

In April 1963, the squadron was the first SAC missile squadron to pass an Operational Readiness inspection and was the only missile squadron to pass every inspection. It was cited by the Air Force Association as the best missile unit in the Air Force and as the best maintenance unit in SAC.

On 19 November 1964, the Department of Defense announced that all Atlas E and F missiles would be removed from the inventory. (Note: Headquarters USAF had approved the phaseout of Atlas and Titan I missiles in May 1963. SAC Missile Chronology, p. 40.) The squadron's first missiles were taken off alert in January 1965. By 31 March all squadron missiles had been prepared for shipment to storage. The squadron became non-operational on 6 April, and was inactivated on 25 June, the last Altas E squadron to inactivate.

== Lineage ==
- Constituted as the 567th Bombardment Squadron (Heavy) on 19 December 1942

Activated on 24 December 1942
Redesignated 567th Bombardment Squadron, Heavy on 4 January 1944
Inactivated on 13 September 1945

- Redesignated 567th Bombardment Squadron, Very Heavy on 25 August 1947

Activated in the reserve on 15 September 1947
Inactivated on 27 June 1949

- Redesignated 567th Strategic Missile Squadron on 16 December 1959 and activated (not organized)

Organized on 1 April 1960
Inactivated on 25 June 1965

=== Assignments ===
- 389th Bombardment Group, 24 December 1942 – 13 September 1945
- Second Air Force, 15 September 1947
- Tenth Air Force, 1 July 1948 – 27 June 1949
- Strategic Air Command, 16 December 1959 (not organized)
- 92d Bombardment Wing (later 92d Strategic Aerospace Wing), 1 April 1960 – 25 June 1965

=== Stations ===
- Davis-Monthan Field, Arizona, 24 December 1942
- Biggs Field, Texas, 1 February 1943
- Lowry Field, Colorado, 17 April-2 June 1943
- RAF Hethel (AAF-114), England, 17 June 1943 – c. 28 May 1945 (operated from Soluch Airfield, Libya, 3 July–c. 25 August 1943; Massicault Airfield, Tunisia, c. 19 September-3 October 1943)
- Charleston Army Air Field, South Carolina, 12 June-13 September 1945
- Coffeyville Municipal Airport, Kansas, 15 September 1947 – 27 June 1949
- Fairchild Air Force Base, Washington, 1 April 1960 – 25 June 1965

=== Aircraft and missiles ===
- Consolidated B-24 Liberator, 1942–1945
- Convair SM-65E (later CGM-16E) Atlas, 1960–1965

=== Awards and campaigns ===
Award streamer	Award	Dates	Notes
	Distinguished Unit Citation	1 August 1943	Ploesti, Romania 567th Bombardment Squadron
	Air Force Outstanding Unit Award	1 January 1961-31 March 1962	567th Strategic Missile Squadron

Campaign Streamer	Campaign	Dates	Notes
	Air Offensive, Europe	16 June 1943–5 June 1944	567th Bombardment Squadron
	Air Combat, EAME Theater	16 June 1943–11 May 1945	567th Bombardment Squadron
	Sicily	3 July 1943–17 August 1943	567th Bombardment Squadron
	Naples-Foggia	18 August 1943–3 October 1943	567th Bombardment Squadron
	Normandy	6 June 1944–24 July 1944	567th Bombardment Squadron
	Northern France	25 July 1944–14 September 1944	567th Bombardment Squadron
	Rhineland	15 September 1944–21 March 1945	567th Bombardment Squadron
	Ardennes-Alsace	16 December 1944–25 January 1945	567th Bombardment Squadron
	Central Europe	22 March 1944–21 May 1945	567th Bombardment Squadron

== See also ==
- List of United States Air Force missile squadrons
- B-24 Liberator units of the United States Army Air Forces
