= Lloyd Herbert Hughes =

American pilot

Lloyd Herbert Hughes Jr.
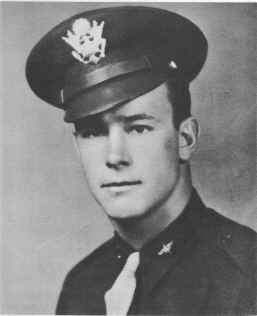
- Born: July 12, 1921; Alexandria, Louisiana, US
- Died: August 1, 1943 (aged 22); Prahova River, Câmpina, Romania
- Burial place: Fort Sam Houston National Cemetery, San Antonio, Texas
- Military career
- Allegiance: United States
- Branch: United States Army Air Forces
- Service years: 1942–1943
- Rank: Second Lieutenant
- Units: 564th Bombardment Squadron, 389th Bombardment Group
- Conflicts: World War II: European air campaign; Eastern Front; Oil campaign; Operation Tidal Wave †
- Awards: Medal of Honor; Purple Heart; Air Medal

Lloyd Herbert "Pete" Hughes Jr., (July 12, 1921 – August 1, 1943), was a pilot who held the rank of Second Lieutenant in the United States Army Air Forces who received the Medal of Honor for his actions in Operation Tidal Wave during World War II.

== Early life and family ==
Hughes was born in Alexandria, Louisiana, the only son of Lloyd Herbert Hughes Sr. and Mildred Mae Rainey Hughes. Family and friends called him Pete. One source described his parents as Welsh immigrants, but Mildred was born in Josserand, Texas. The family lived in Alexandria only briefly before moving to his mother's native state of Texas.

He graduated from Refugio High School, Refugio, Texas, in 1939 and went on to attend Corpus Christi Junior College in Corpus Christi and Texas A&M University in College Station. He studied petroleum engineering at Texas A&M and was a member of the class of 1943, but left school before graduating. A few weeks after the attack on Pearl Harbor he joined the military. He entered the military service at San Antonio on January 28, 1942 (At the age of 20), and was appointed an aviation cadet the same day.

On November 8, 1942, Hughes married Hazel Dean Ewing.

== Military service ==
After attending flight school in Tulsa and Enid, Oklahoma, Hughes received his pilot's wings at Lubbock, Texas, on November 10, 1942. He was assigned to the 389th Bombardment Group, went to Africa in June 1943, and participated in five combat missions in the Italy-Romania area.

During Operation Tidal Wave, the most highly decorated military mission in U.S. history, 179 B-24 Liberator heavy bombers took off on an 18-hour, 2,400 mile round trip mission to destroy the largest of the oil refineries at Ploieşti, 30 miles north of Bucharest, Romania. The raid would not be a success. Fifty-four aircraft never returned and of the five U.S. Air Force airmen, including 2nd Lt. Lloyd Herbert Hughes were awarded the Medal of Honor for bravery; three of which, including Hughes, would receive the award posthumously.

During the August 1, 1943 bombing mission over the Câmpina oil fields north of the Ploieşti oil fields in Romania, Hughes was the pilot of a B-24 flying in the last element of a formation. When he arrived in the target area the enemy defenses were already alerted by previous aircraft. He approached the target at a planned, but dangerously low altitude, through intense and accurate anti-aircraft fire and densely arranged barrage balloons. Several hits from both large and small caliber anti-aircraft guns seriously damaged his aircraft and caused gasoline to leak from tanks in the bomb bay and left wing. The leak was so heavy that it blinded his waist gunner's view. Hughes could have attempted a forced landing of his damaged aircraft in one of the surrounding grain fields before he reached the target area which was blazing with burning oil tanks and refinery equipment. Flames were reaching high above the bombing level of the formation. Knowing the consequences of entering the inferno with his airplane leaking gasoline in two places, Hughes elected to carry on, rather than jeopardize the formation and the success of the attack. He flew into the wall of fire at about 30 ft (9.1 m) above the ground and dropped his bomb load with precision.

He emerged from the conflagration with the left wing of his aircraft on fire. He attempted to pull up and away from the action, trying to save his plane and crew. He successfully slowed the plane's speed from 225 to 100 miles an hour. It looked as if he would be able to crash land in the dry river bed of the Prahova River, when suddenly the left wing flew off and the plane cartwheeled into the ground. Of the ten men aboard the B-24, Hughes and five others were killed, two died of their wounds within days and the two who survived the crash became prisoners of war.

On November 13, 2010, he was inducted into the Louisiana Military Hall of Fame in Abbeville, Louisiana.

== Medal of Honor ==
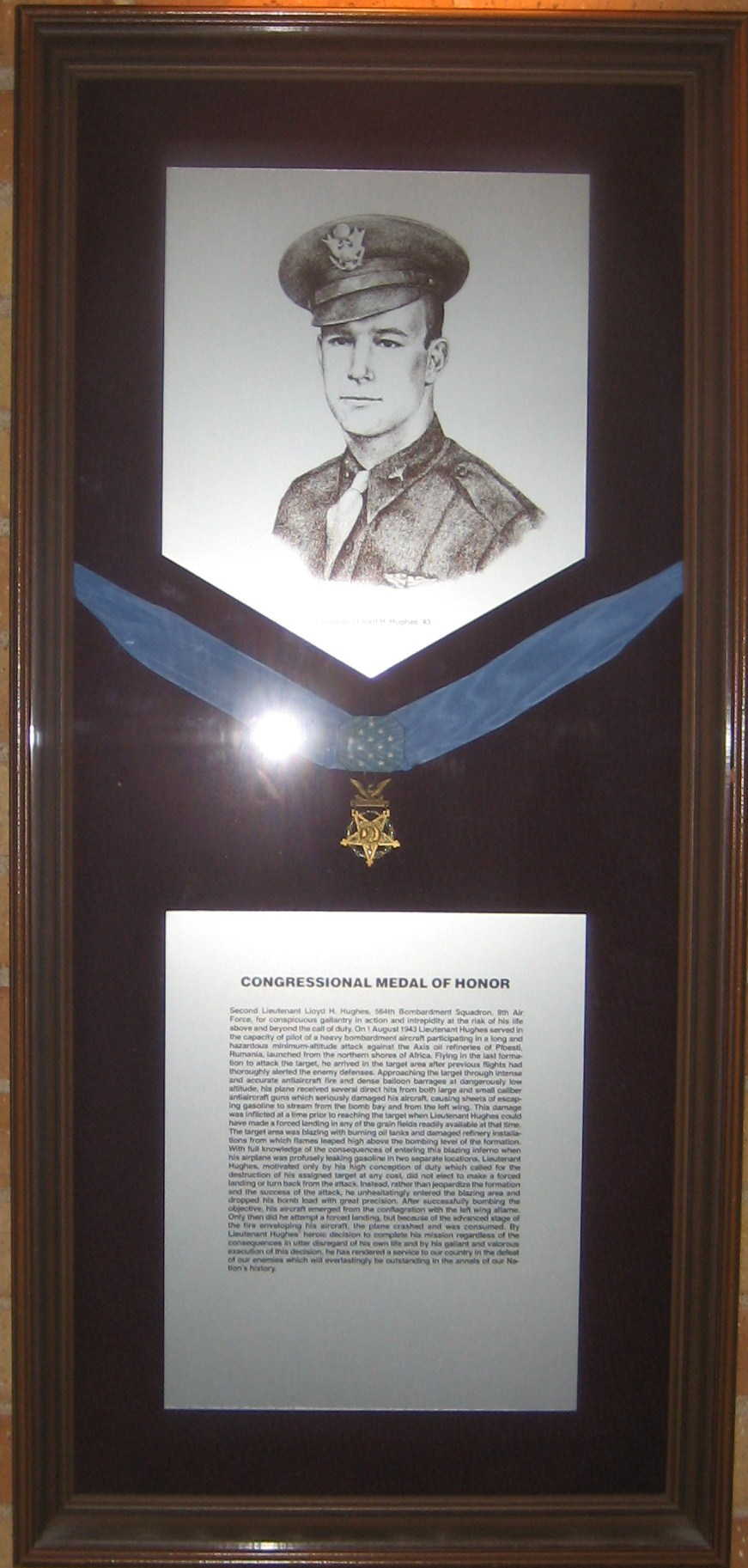
A drawing of Hughes and a specimen Medal of Honor on display at Texas A&M University

Eight months after he was killed in action, on April 18, 1944, Hughes' Medal of Honor was presented to his widow Hazel. Hughes was the first of seven Texas A&M alumni to receive the medal for actions during World War II. On March 30, 2009, his family loaned the medal to the Sanders Corps of Cadets Center on the Texas A&M campus.

Hughes' official Medal of Honor citation reads:

For conspicuous gallantry in action and intrepidity at the risk of his life above and beyond the call of duty. On August 1943, 2d Lt. Hughes served in the capacity of pilot of a heavy bombardment aircraft participating in a long and hazardous minimum-altitude attack against the Axis oil refineries of Ploesti, Rumania, launched from the northern shores of Africa. Flying in the last formation to attack the target, he arrived in the target area after previous flights had thoroughly alerted the enemy defenses. Approaching the target through intense and accurate antiaircraft fire and dense balloon barrages at dangerously low altitude, his plane received several direct hits from both large and small caliber antiaircraft guns which seriously damaged his aircraft, causing sheets of escaping gasoline to stream from the bomb bay and from the left wing. This damage was inflicted at a time prior to reaching the target when 2d Lt. Hughes could have made a forced landing in any of the grain fields readily available at that time. The target area was blazing with burning oil tanks and damaged refinery installations from which flames leaped high above the bombing level of the formation. With full knowledge of the consequences of entering this blazing inferno when his airplane was profusely leaking gasoline in two separate locations, 2d Lt. Hughes, motivated only by his high conception of duty which called for the destruction of his assigned target at any cost, did not elect to make a forced landing or turn back from the attack. Instead, rather than jeopardize the formation and the success of the attack, he unhesitatingly entered the blazing area and dropped his bomb load with great precision. After successfully bombing the objective, his aircraft emerged from the conflagration with the left wing aflame. Only then did he attempt a forced landing, but because of the advanced stage of the fire enveloping his aircraft the plane crashed and was consumed. By 2d Lt. Hughes' heroic decision to complete his mission regardless of the consequences in utter disregard of his own life, and by his gallant and valorous execution of this decision, he has rendered a service to our country in the defeat of our enemies which will everlastingly be outstanding in the annals of our Nation's history.

== Awards and decorations ==

Badge	Army Air Forces Pilot Badge		
1st row	Medal of Honor		
2nd row	Purple Heart	Air Medal	Army Good Conduct Medal
3rd row	American Campaign Medal	European–African–Middle Eastern Campaign Medal with two campaign star	World War II Victory Medal

== See also ==
- List of Medal of Honor recipients for World War II
