= 5th Expeditionary Airborne Command and Control Squadron =

5th Expeditionary Airborne Command and Control Squadron

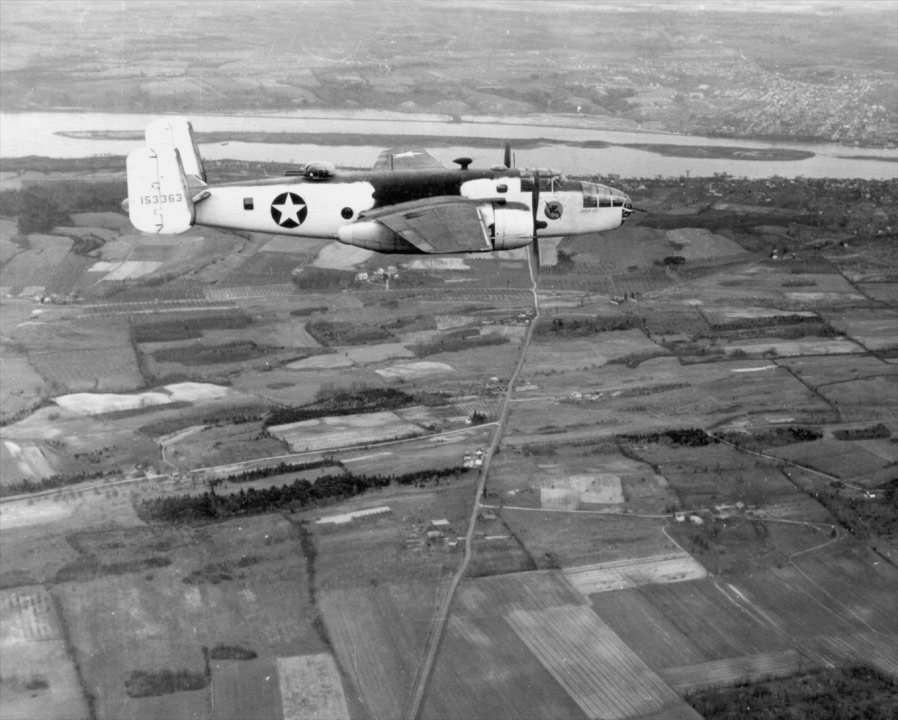
- B-25 Mitchell parto of the antisubmarine operations
- Active: 1943; 1970–1974
- Country: United States
- Branch: United States Air Force
- Role: Airborne command and control
- Part of: Pacific Air Forces
- Engagements: Antisubmarine Campaign
- Decorations: Air Force Outstanding Unit Award

Insignia
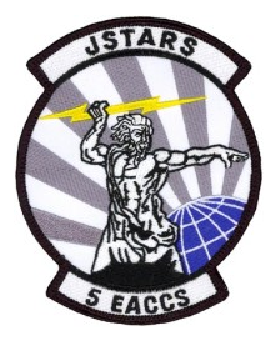
- Patch with 5th Expeditionary Airborne Command & Control Sq emblem

The 5th Expeditionary Airborne Command and Control Squadron is a provisional squadron of the United States Air Force. It is assigned to Pacific Air Forces to activate or inactivate as needed.

The squadron was formed as the 5th Airborne Command and Control Squadron in 1985 by the consolidation of the 25th Antisubmarine Squadron an Army Air Forces unit that served in the American Theater of World War II and the 25th Special Operations Squadron, a training unit during the Vietnam War. The squadron was not active after the merger of these two units. It was converted to expeditionary status in 2015.

== History ==
=== World War II ===
The first predecessor of the squadron was the 25th Antisubmarine Squadron. The squadron was activated in May 1943 at Jacksonville Army Air Field and assigned to the 26th Antisubmarine Wing, which had responsibility for Army Air Forces (AAF) units conducting antisubmarine warfare off the South Atlantic coast and in the Caribbean Sea and the Gulf of Mexico. It conducted antisubmarine patrols and assisted the United States Navy to protect friendly shipping off the southeastern coast of the United States from May through August 1943. However, a month after the squadron was activated, the AAF had agreed to turn over its coastal antisubmarine mission to the Navy, effective in August 1943. The squadron continued to operate its bombers, although Army Air Forces Antisubmarine Command became I Bomber Command under First Air Force.

In October 1943, the 25th moved to Clovis Army Air Field, New Mexico, becoming part of Second Air Force, which was responsible for advanced bomber training. At Clovis, the personnel and equipment of the squadron were assigned to other squadrons and the squadron was inactivated.

=== Vietnam War ===
The squadron's second predecessor was the 25th Special Operations Squadron, which was activated at Hurlburt Field, Florida on 31 August 1970. The squadron was initially equipped with a variety of special operations aircraft, but lost most of them in 1971 and focused on photographic processing, interpretation, production, and distribution of reconnaissance information until it was inactivated in September 1974.

=== Consolidation ===
In 1985 the two squadrons were consolidated as the 5th Airborne Command and Control Squadron, but remained inactive. The squadron was converted to provisional status in 2015 and allotted to Pacific Air Forces (PACAF) to activate or inactivate as needed for expeditionary operations. PACAF has reportedly activated the squadron at Kadena Air Base, equipped with Northrop Grumman E-8 Joint STARS aircraft.

== Lineage ==
25th Antisubmarine Squadron

- Constituted as the 25th Antisubmarine Squadron (Heavy) on 20 April 1943

Activated on 1 May 1943
Disbanded on 28 October 1943

- Reconstituted on 19 September 1985 and consolidated with the 25th Special Operations Squadron as the 5th Airborne Command and Control Squadron

25th Special Operations Squadron

- Constituted as the 25th Special Operations Squadron on 24 August 1970

Activated on 31 August 1970
Redesignated 25 Special Operations Squadron (Reconnaissance Support) on 1 June 1971
Inactivated on 30 September 1974

- Consolidated with the 25th Antisubmarine Squadron as the 5th Airborne Command and Control Squadron on 19 September 1985

Consolidated Squadron

- Formed as the 5th Airborne Command and Control Squadron by the consolidation of the 25th Antisubmarine Squadron and the 25 Special Operations Squadron on 19 September 1985

Redesignated 5th Expeditionary Airborne Command and Control Squadron and converted to provisional status on 30 June 2015

=== Assignments ===
- 26th Antisubmarine Wing, 1 May 1943
- Second Air Force, 9–28 October 1943.\
- 1st Special Operations Wing (later 834th Tactical Composite) Wing), 31 August 1970 – 30 September 1974
- Pacific Air Forces to activate or inactivate as needed at any time after 30 June 2015

Unknown, after 2015

=== Stations ===
- Jacksonville Army Air Field, Florida, 1 May 1943
- Clovis Army Air Field, New Mexico, 9–28 October 1943
- Hurlburt Field, Florida, 31 August 1970 – 30 September 1974
- Kadena Air Base, Okinawa, Japan, after 2015

=== Aircraft ===
- Lockheed A-29 Hudson, 1943
- North American B-25 Mitchell, 1943
- Cessna A-37 Dragonfly, 1970-1971
- Fairchild C-123 Provider, 1970-1973
- Bell UH-1 Huey, 1970-1971
- Helio U-10 Courier, 1970-1971
- Sikorsky CH-3, 1973-1974
- Northrop Grumman E-8 JSTARS, after 2015

=== Awards and campaigns ===
Award streamer	Award	Dates	Notes
	Air Force Outstanding Unit Award	31 August 1970–15 April 1971	25th Special Operations Squadron

Campaign Streamer	Campaign	Dates	Notes
	Antisubmarine	1 May 1943 – 1 August 1943	25th Antisubmarine Squadron
