= 564th Missile Squadron =

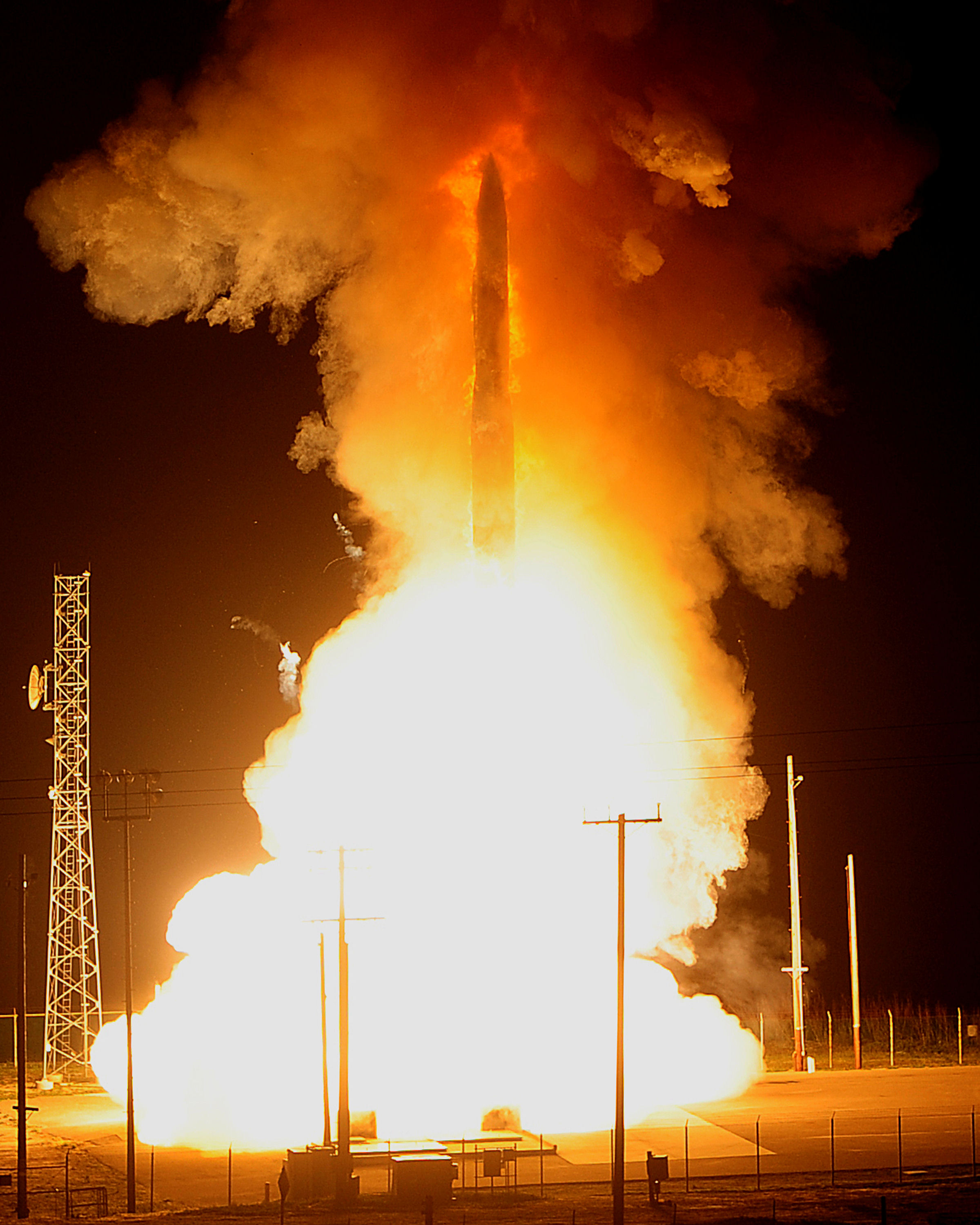
- LGM-30G Minuteman III test launch at Vandenberg AFB, California
- Active: 1943-1945; 1947–1949; 1958–1964; 1966–2008
- Country: United States
- Branch: United States Air Force
- Type: Squadron
- Role: Intercontinental ballistic missile
- Nickname: Deuce
- Engagements: European Theater of Operations
- Decorations: Distinguished Unit Citation; Air Force Outstanding Unit Award

Insignia
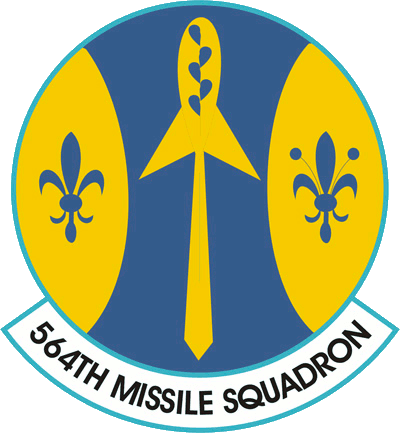
- 564th Missile Squadron emblem (Note: Approved 28 February 1995. Description: Azure, between flaunches Or bearing fleurs-de-lis of the first [color mentioned] a "sky sword" Yellow charged on the grip with a sprig of laurel Blue; all within a diminished bordure Celeste.)

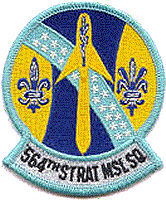
- Patch with 1967 564th Strategic Missile Squadron emblem (Note: Approved 15 September 1967.)

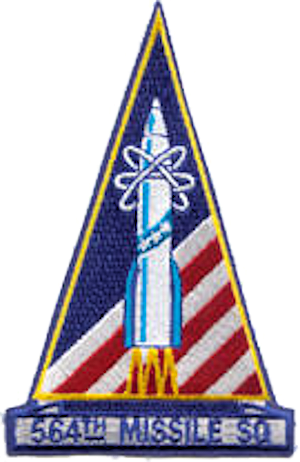
- Patcvh with 1959 564th Strategic Missile Squadron emblem (Note: Approved 9 July 1959. Description: On an Air Force blue isosceles triangle one point up, edged Air Force golden yellow, eight diagonal stripes in base alternating red and white; overall issuing from base palewise a white missile pointing upward, markings shades of blue, its three exhaust trails to base, Air Force golden yellow and red; around the center of the missile a SAC ribbon (light blue, spattered with white stars); encircling the nose three white electrons in orbit; the lower edge of the Air Force blue field spattered with white tars; outlines and details Air Force blue throughout.)

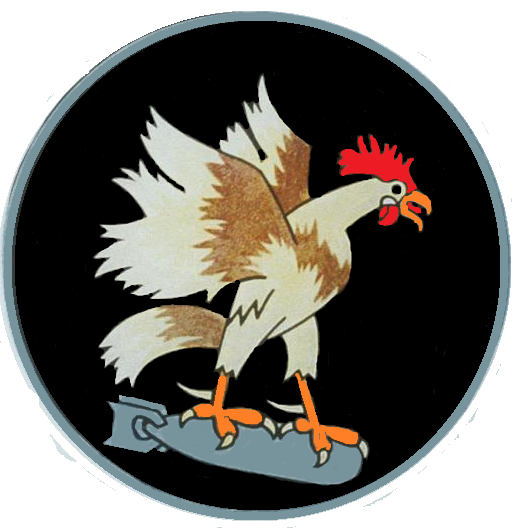
- 564th Bombardment Squadron emblem
- World War II fuselage marking: YO

The 564th Missile Squadron is an inactive United States Air Force unit. It was last assigned to the 341st Operations Group at Malmstrom Air Force Base, Montana, where it was inactivated on 19 August 2008.

The squadron was first activated during World War II as the 564th Bombardment Squadron, when after training in the United States, it deployed to England and participated in the strategic bombing campaign against Germany. Shortly after its arrival in Europe, the squadron sent a detachment to Libya. From this location, the detachment participated in Operation Tidal Wave, the low level attack on oil refineries near Ploesti, for which the squadron was awarded a Distinguished Unit Citation. Following V-E Day, the squadron returned to the United States and was inactivated in September 1945. The squadron was active from 1947 to 1949 in the reserve, but does not appear to have been fully equipped or manned.

The squadron was reactivated in July 1958 as the 564th Strategic Missile Squadron. On 1 December 1958, it was the first Air Force intercontinental ballistic missile squadron to go on nuclear alert status. It was inactivated in 1964 with the phase out of the SM-65D Atlas missile.

On 1 April 1966, the 564th was reactivated with the LGM-30F Minuteman II missile, and in 1975 was upgraded to the LGM-30G Minuteman III. It was inactivated when the United States reduced its land based missile force.

== History ==
=== World War II ===
==== Initial activation and training ====
The squadron was first activated as the 564th Bombardment Squadron in late December 1942 at Davis-Monthan Field, Arizona, one of the original four squadrons of the 389th Bombardment Group. A little over a month later, its cadre moved to Biggs Field, Texas, where it began training with the Consolidated B-24 Liberator heavy bomber. The squadron departed the United States for the European Theater of Operations in June 1943. The ground echelon proceeded to the New York Port of Embarkation and Camp Kilmer, New Jersey, sailing on the RMS Queen Elizabeth, reaching the United Kingdom on 6 July. The air echelon began ferrying their Liberators to Europe on 13 June after staging at Sioux City Army Air Base via the North Atlantic ferry route.

==== Combat in Europe ====
By the time the ground echelon arrived at the squadron's combat station, RAF Hethel, the squadron had been called upon to reinforce Ninth Air Force in Africa and had begun its movement to Libya. The advanced echelon of the 389th Group had arrived at Hethel on 11 June and most of the air echelon was in place two weeks later. Personnel were transferred from the 44th and 93d Bombardment Groups to provide the squadron ground support in Libya.

The squadron flew its first combat mission on 9 July 1943, with an attack on Maleme, Crete. It also flew missions to Sicily and other parts of Italy to support Operation Husky, the invasion of Sicily through the middle of July. During the later part of the month the squadron concentrated on training for low-level operations in preparation for the attack on the oil refineries around Ploesti, Romania. Operation Tidal Wave was launched on 1 August 1943, with the squadron forming part of the last group formation to attack. The squadron headed for its target in Campina. This target was the most distant of the refineries being attacked and was assigned to the 389th Group because its B-24Ds were late production models and had a longer range than the planes of the other attacking groups. This refinery was totally destroyed in the attack. The squadron was awarded a Distinguished Unit Citation for this action. Before returning to England, the squadron participated in another long range attack on the Messerschmitt aircraft factory at Wiener Neustadt, Austria on 13 August, which reduced the production of Bf 109s at the factory by a third. The squadron returned to England in the last week of August.

The 564th flew its first combat mission from England on 7 September 1943, when it attacked an air base in the Netherlands. The squadron again deployed to Tunisia during September and October 1943 to support Operation Avalanche, the landings on the Italian mainland at Salerno, striking targets in Corsica, Italy, and Austria. after returning to England, the squadron concentrated on strategic bombing campaign against Germany, with targets including industrial areas of Berlin, oil production plants at Merseburg, and factories at Munster, and shipbuilding facilities at Vegesack. It struck V-1 flying bomb and V-2 rocket launch sites in the Pas de Calais and participated in the strikes against the German aircraft manufacturing industry during Big Week in late February 1944.

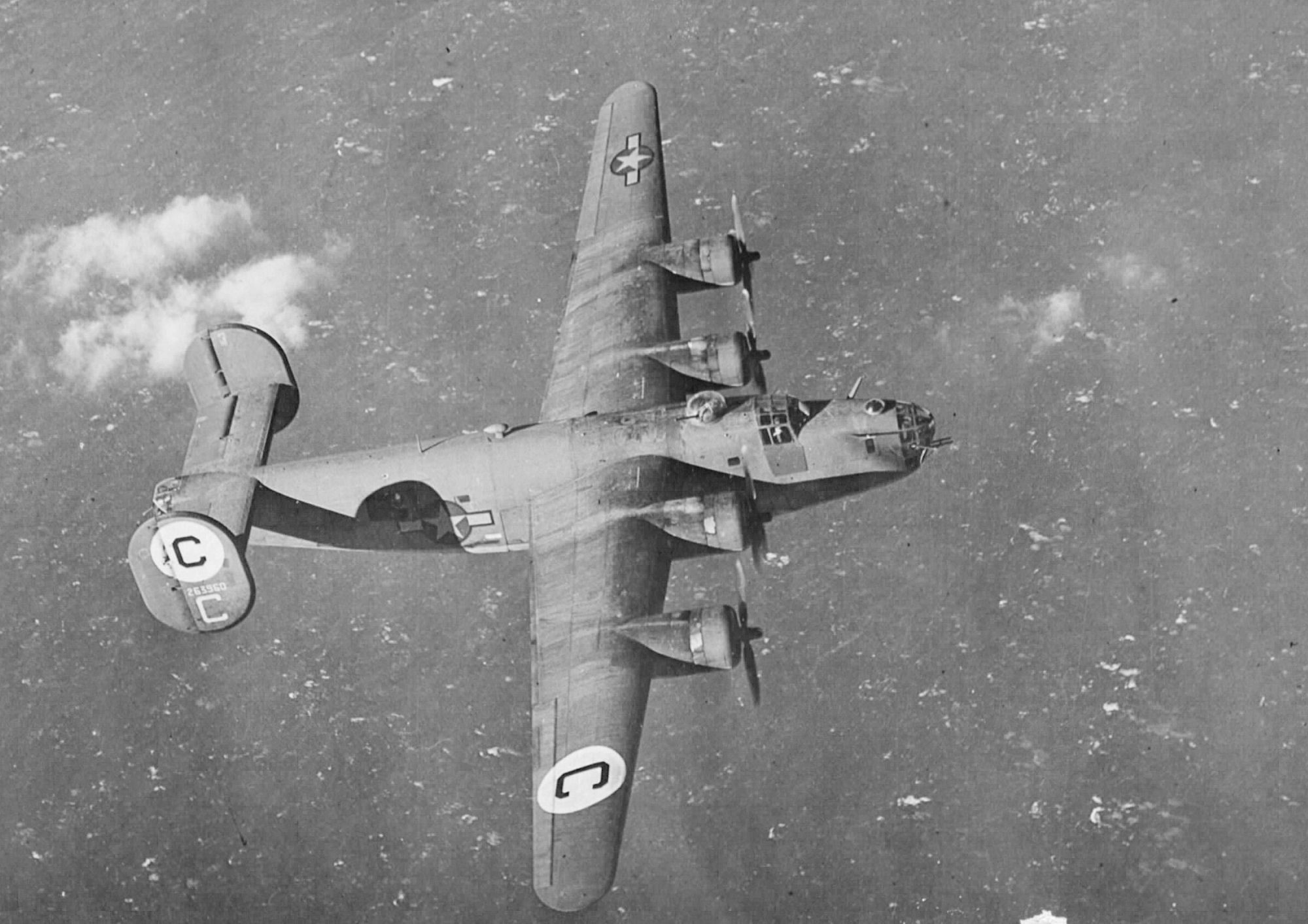
Squadron B-24D Liberator on a raid over Cognac, France (Note: Aircraft is Consolidated B-24D-15-CF Liberator, serial 42-63960 Dorothy. Taken on 8 February 1944.)

The squadron was occasionally diverted from strategic targets to perform air support and interdiction missions. To support Operation Overlord, the invasion of Normandy, it hit airfields and artillery batteries. It struck enemy positions to support Operation Cobra, the breakout at Saint Lo. During the Battle of the Bulge, from December 1944 to January 1945, it attacked storage depots and communications centers. It supported Operation Varsity, the airborne assault across the Rhine by dropping food, ammunition, and other supplies to the ground troops. The squadron flew its last mission on 25 April 1945.

==== Return to the United States and inactivation ====
Following V-E Day, the squadron returned to the United States. The first airplane left Hethel on 20 May 1945 and the ground echelon left England on the SS Cristobal on 30 May. The squadron reformed at Charleston Army Air Field, South Carolina in June for air transport missions, but was not fully manned before inactivating on 13 September 1945.

=== Air reserve ===
The squadron was activated in the reserve at Fairfax Field, Kansas, where it trained under the supervision of Air Defense Command (ADC)'s 4101st AAF Base Unit (Reserve Training) (later 2472d AF Reserve Training Center). It is not clear to what degree the squadron was staffed or equipped. (no aircraft listed as assigned to the squadron from 1947 to 1949); AFHRA Factsheet (unknown what aircraft assigned). In 1948 Continental Air Command (ConAC) assumed responsibility for managing reserve and Air National Guard units from ADC. President Truman's reduced 1949 defense budget required reductions in the number of units in the Air Force, In addition, ConAC reorganized its reserve units under the wing base organization system in June 1949. The 564th was inactivated and the squadron's personnel and equipment were transferred to elements of the 442d Troop Carrier Wing, which became the reserve organization at Fairfax.

=== Intercontinental ballistic missiles ===
==== Atlas-D ICBM era ====
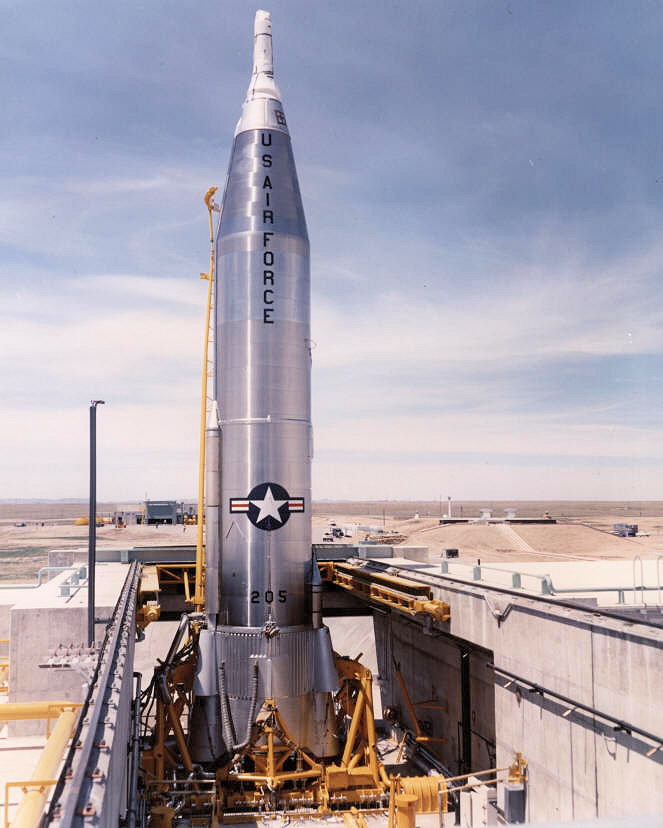
564th Strategic Missile Squadron SM-65D Atlas missile (Note: Missile is Convair SM-65D Atlas, serial 58-2205. After removal, it was expended in a test firing on 5 October 1965. Baugher, Joe (21 April 2023). "1958 USAF Serial Numbers". Joe Baugher. The missile is on pad 564-A2, Warren I site, taken in 1961.)

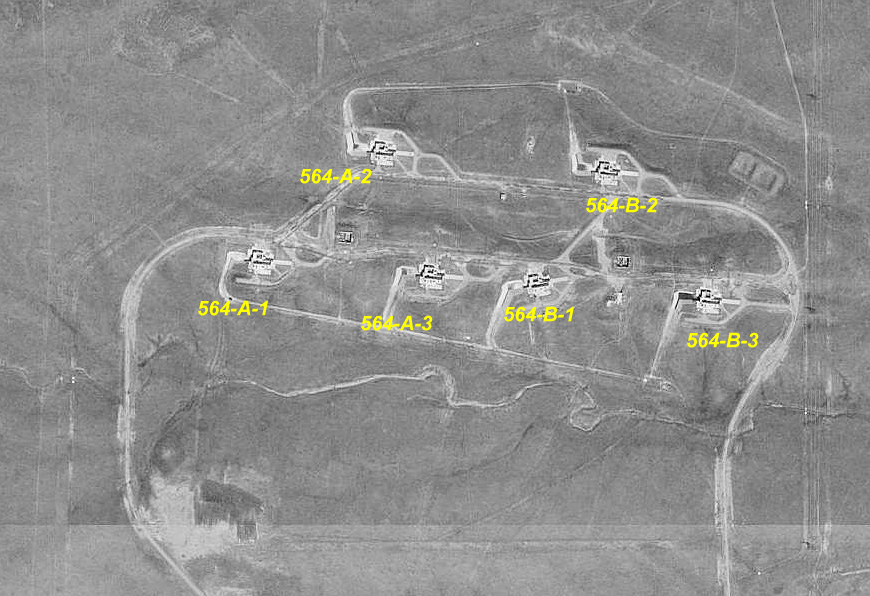
SM-65D Atlas missile sites northwest of Warren AFB, Wyoming

In October 1957, Secretary of Defense Charles E. Wilson established a goal of deployment of four SM-65 Atlas squadrons by 1962. The following month, Francis E. Warren Air Force Base, Wyoming was announced as Strategic Air Command (SAC)'s first intercontinental ballistic missile base. Construction of the first Atlas launch facility at Warren began in June 1958. The squadron was redesignated the 564th Strategic Missile Squadron and activated at Warren on 1 July 1958 and assigned to the 706th Strategic Missile Wing, although it was not operational until late January 1959.

Squadron missile sites were located at:

564-A, 10.6 mi NW of Federal WY 41°22′44″N 104°58′25″W
564-B, 10.6 mi NW of Federal WY 41°22′43″N 104°58′07″W

The squadron was assigned six Atlas D missiles. The missiles were located on six launch pads, controlled by two launch operations buildings and clustered around a central guidance control facility. (Note: This was called the 3 x 2 configuration. SAC Missile Chronology p. 18.) The squadron would be the only Atlas unit deployed in this configuration However, the Atlas missile itself was still under development and the first successful launch of an Atlas D missile from Cape Canaveral Air Force Station, Florida did not occur until 9 September 1959. The squadron received its first missile later that month, the first delivered to a field unit. In April 1960, the coffin type launcher used by the squadron was successfully tested at Vandenberg Air Force Base, California and declared operationally ready. The first Atlas D complex was turned over to the 564th and declared operational on 9 August 1960. On 1 July 1961, the 389th Strategic Missile Wing replaced the 706th and took over its resources.

In response to the Cuban Missile Crisis, on 20 October SAC directed that all Atlas D missiles off alert for modifications be "as covertly as possible" and returned to alert status. Atlas missiles being used for operational readiness training were to be put on alert as soon as liquid oxygen was available. For safety reasons, liquid nitrogen was used rather than liquid oxygen during training. Despite the need for stealth, eventually a priority was established that resulted in the entire production of liquid oxygen in the US being diverted to SAC to bring the missiles to readiness. From 3 November the number of alert missiles was reduced until on 29 November the number was the same as before the crisis. Normal training had resumed on 15 November.

In May 1963, the Air Force determined that all Atlas D missiles would be phased out of its inventory between 1965 and 1968. A year later, Secretary of Defense Robert McNamara directed this program be accelerated and the first Atlas D missile left Warren on 26 May 1964. with the retirement of the Atlas D, the squadron was inactivated on 1 September 1964.

==== Minuteman ICBM era ====
On 1 April 1966, the squadron was organized at Malmstrom Air Force Base, Montana and assigned to the 341st Strategic Missile Wing. It was the twentieth and last Minuteman squadron to be activated and was armed with the LGM-30F Minuteman II. Construction of the squadron's launch facilities was completed in October. On 21 April 1967, the squadron was declared operational by SAC and its last missiles were placed on alert the following month, completing the deployment of the Minuteman force. The LGM-30F was the second Minuteman system deployed at Malmstrom, resulting in the squadron being nicknamed "Deuce."

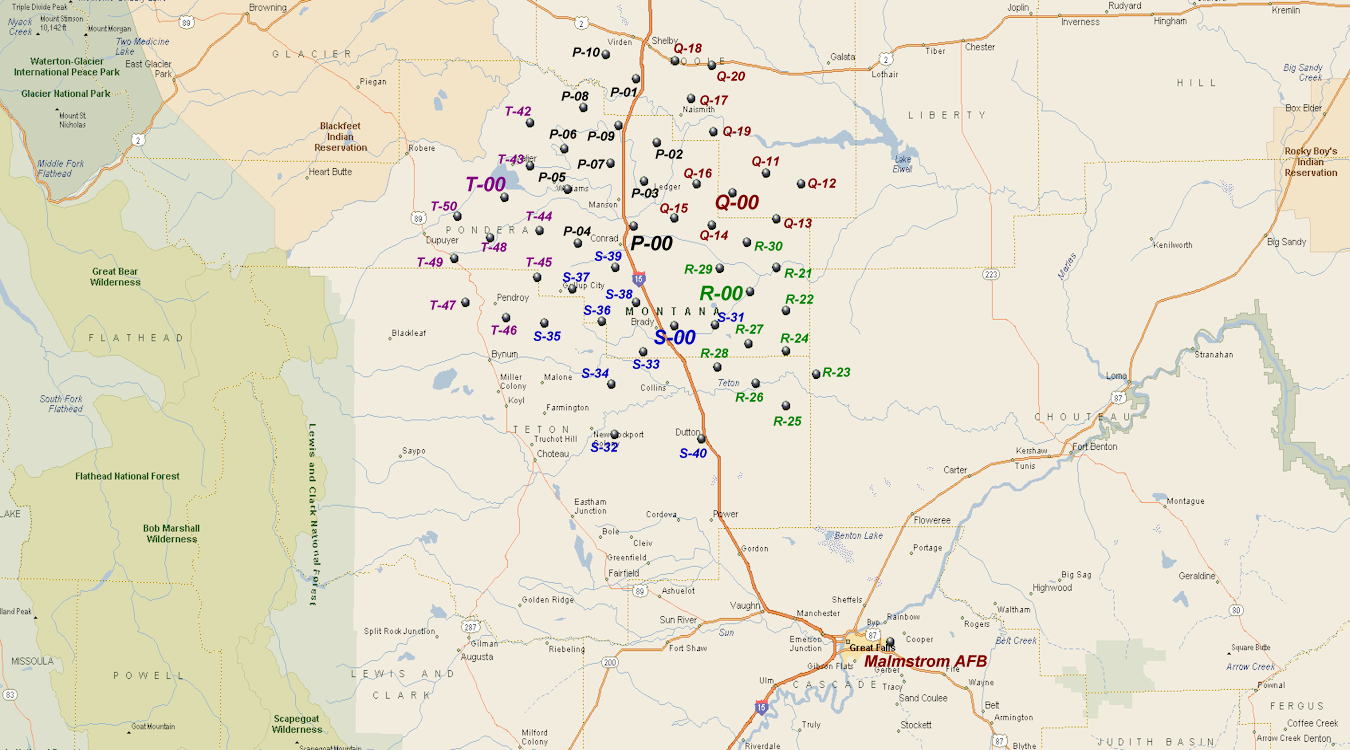
Squadron missile alert and launch facilities

The squadrons Missile Alert Facilities (P-T flights, each controlling 10 missiles) are located as follows:

P-00 2.9 mi NE of Conrad MT, 48°12′18″N 111°54′31″W
Q-00 9.0 mi E of Ledger MT, 48°15′37″N 111°37′33″W
R-00 12.8 mi ENE of Brady MT, 48°05′42″N 111°34′36″W
S-00 2.2 mi E of Brady MT, 48°02′14″N 111°47′30″W
T-00 4.0 mi SxSW of Valier MT, 48°15′09″N 112°16′32″W

In January 1975, the fifty Minuteman II missiles of the squadron began to be replaced by LGM-30G Minuteman IIIs. Conversion to the upgraded version of the Minuteman was completed by July. In September 1991, SAC implemented the Objective Wing organization and the squadron was assigned to the 341st Operations Group. With the disestablishment of SAC in 1992, Air Force Space Command assumed responsibility for the intercontinental ballistic missile force.

The 2006 Quadrennial Defense Review determined to reduce the Minuteman II missile force from 500 to 450 missiles. As a result, in 2007, the squadron's missiles were taken off alert and removed from their silos in a process that took thirteen months. The squadron was inactivated on 15 August 2008.

== Lineage ==
- Constituted as the 564th Bombardment Squadron (Heavy) on 19 December 1942

Activated on 24 December 1942
Redesignated 564th Bombardment Squadron, Heavy on 4 January 1944
Inactivated on 13 September 1945

- Redesignated 564th Bombardment Squadron, Very Heavy on 28 January 1947

Activated in the reserve on 27 February 1947
Inactivated on 27 June 1949

- Redesignated 564th Strategic Missile Squadron (ICBM-Atlas) on 1 May 1958

Activated on 1 July 1958
Discontinued and inactivated on 1 September 1964

- Redesignated 564th Strategic Missile Squadron (ICBM-Minuteman) and activated, on 14 December 1965 (not organized)

Organized on 1 April 1966
Redesignated 564th Missile Squadron on 1 September 1991
Inactivated on 15 August 2008

=== Assignments ===
- 389th Bombardment Group, 24 December 1942 – 13 September 1945
- Second Air Force, 15 September 1947
- Tenth Air Force, 1 July 1948 – 27 June 1949
- 706th Strategic Missile Wing, 1 July 1958
- 389th Strategic Missile Wing, 1 July 1961 – 1 September 1964
- Strategic Air Command, 14 December 1965 (not organized)
- 341st Strategic Missile Wing, 1 April 1966
- 341st Operations Group, 1 September 1991 – 15 August 2008

=== Stations ===
- Davis-Monthan Field, Arizona, 24 December 1942
- Biggs Field, Texas, 1 February 1943
- Lowry Field, Colorado, 19 April–1 June 1943
- RAF Hethel (AAF-114), England, 16 June 1943 – c. 28 May 1945 (operated from Soluch Airfield, Libya, 3 July-25 August 1943, Massicault Airfield, Tunisia, 19 September–3 October 1943)
- Charleston Army Air Field, South Carolina, 12 Jun-13 September 1945
- Rapid City Army Air Base, South Dakota, 15 September 1947 – 27 June 1949
- Fairfax Field, Kansas, 15 August 1959
- Francis E. Warren Air Force Base, Wyoming, 1 December 1958 – 1 September 1964
- Malmstrom Air Force Base, Montana, 1 April 1966 – 15 August 2008

=== Aircraft and missiles ===
- Consolidated B-24 Liberator, 1942–1945
- SM-65D Atlas, 1960–1964
- LGM-30F Minuteman II, 1967–1975
- LGM-30G Minuteman III, 1975–2008

=== Awards and campaigns ===
Award streamer	Award	Dates	Notes
	Distinguished Unit Citation	1 August 1943	Ploesti, Romania 564th Bombardment Squadron
	Air Force Outstanding Unit Award	1 July 1975–30 June 1976	564th Strategic Missile Squadron
	Air Force Outstanding Unit Award	1 July 1976–30 June 1977	564th Strategic Missile Squadron
	Air Force Outstanding Unit Award	1 July 1978–30 June 1980	564th Strategic Missile Squadron
	Air Force Outstanding Unit Award	1 July 1980–30 June 1981	564th Strategic Missile Squadron
	Air Force Outstanding Unit Award	1 July 1988–30 June 1990	564th Strategic Missile Squadron
	Air Force Outstanding Unit Award	1 July 1989–30 June 1991	564th Strategic Missile Squadron
	Air Force Outstanding Unit Award	1 September 1991-31 August 1993	564th Missile Squadron
	Air Force Outstanding Unit Award	1 September 1993-31 August 1994	564th Missile Squadron
	Air Force Outstanding Unit Award	1 September 1994-31 May 1995	564th Missile Squadron
	Air Force Outstanding Unit Award	1 October 1997-30 September 1999	564th Missile Squadron
	Air Force Outstanding Unit Award	1 October 2000-30 September 2002	564th Missile Squadron
	Air Force Outstanding Unit Award	1 October 2002-30 September 2004	564th Missile Squadron
	Air Force Outstanding Unit Award	1 October 2004-30 September 2006	564th Missile Squadron

Campaign Streamer	Campaign	Dates	Notes
	Air Offensive, Europe	16 June 1943 – 5 June 1944	564th Bombardment Squadron
	Air Combat, EAME Theater	16 June 1943 – 11 May 1945	564th Bombardment Squadron
	Sicily	3 July 1943 – 17 August 1943	564th Bombardment Squadron
	Naples-Foggia	18 August 1943 – 3 October 1943	564th Bombardment Squadron
	Normandy	6 June 1944 – 24 July 1944	564th Bombardment Squadron
	Northern France	25 July 1944 – 14 September 1944	564th Bombardment Squadron
	Rhineland	15 September 1944 – 21 March 1945	564th Bombardment Squadron
	Ardennes-Alsace	16 December 1944 – 25 January 1945	564th Bombardment Squadron
	Central Europe	22 March 1944 – 21 May 1945	564th Bombardment Squadron

== See also ==
- List of United States Air Force missile squadrons
- 564th Minuteman Missile Squadron Launch Facilities
- B-24 Liberator units of the United States Army Air Forces
