= SM-65 Atlas =

First operational American intercontinental ballistic missile

B-65/SM-65/CGM-16/HGM-16 Atlas
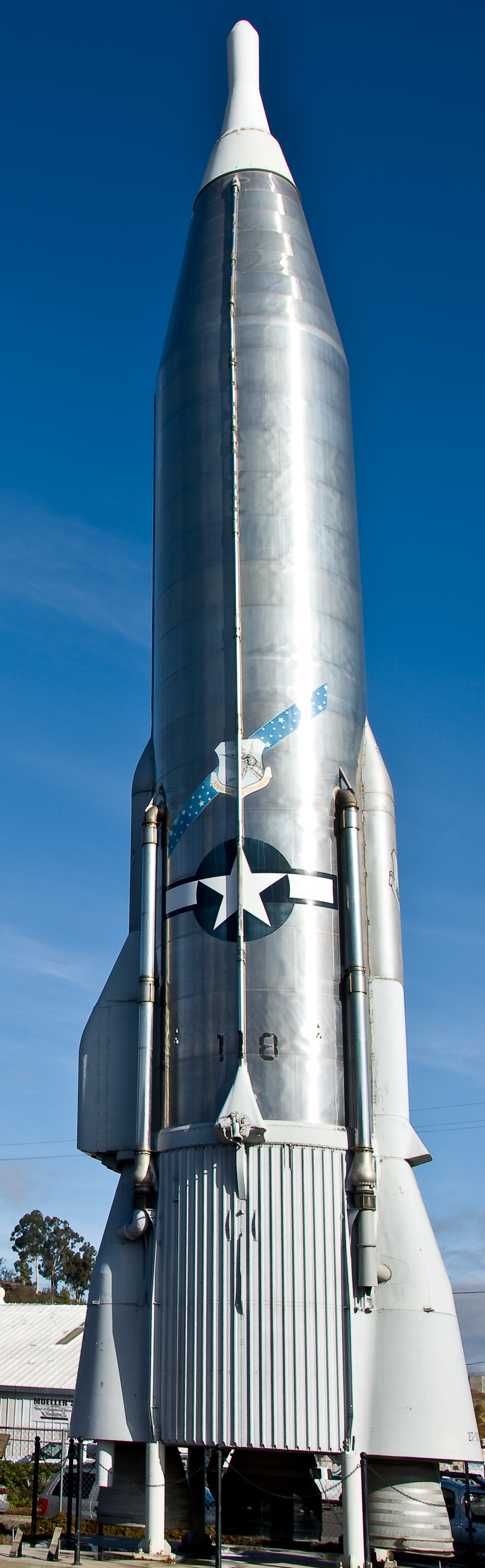
- Atlas 2E missile, San Diego Aerospace Museum
- Function: Intercontinental Ballistic Missile (ICBM)
- Manufacturer: Convair / General Dynamics
- Country of origin: United States

Size
- Height: 75 ft 10 in (23.11 m); 85 ft 6 in (26.06 m) in ICBM configuration
- Diameter: 10 ft (3.0 m)
- Width: 16 ft (4.9 m)
- Mass: 260,000 lb (117,900 kg)
- Stages: 1½

Associated rockets
- Family: Atlas

Launch history
- Status: Retired April 1965
- Total launches: 24
- Success(es): 13
- Failure: 11
- First flight: 11 June 1957
- Last flight: 24 August 1959

Boosters
- No. boosters: 2
- Powered by: 2
- Maximum thrust: 300,000 lbf (1,300 kN); Atlas D
- Total thrust: 360,000 lbf (1,600 kN); Atlas D
- Propellant: RP-1/LOX

First stage
- Powered by: 1
- Maximum thrust: 60,000 lbf (270 kN); Atlas D
- Propellant: RP-1/LOX

Convair X-11 / SM-65 Atlas
- Place of origin: United States

Service history
- In service: 1959–1964
- Used by: United States Air Force
- Wars: Cold War

Production history
- Designed: 1953 (XB-65)
- Manufacturer: Convair
- Produced: 1959–1965
- No. built: 350 (all versions); 129 at peak deployment level (30 D, 27 E, 72 F)
- Variants: Atlas A, B/C, D, E/F (ICBMs); SLV-3/3A/3C (NASA use)

Specifications
- Mass: 255,950 lb (116,100 kg) for Atlas D without payload; 260,000 lb (117,900 kg) for Atlas D with Mk 2/3 RV and W49 warhead; 268,000 lb (121,560 kg) for Atlas E&F with Mk 4 RV and W38 warhead
- Length: 75 ft 1 in (22.89 m) with Mk 2 re-entry vehicle; 82 ft 6 in (25.15 m) with Mk 3
- Width: 16 ft 1 in (4.90 m)
- Diameter: 10 ft 0 in (3.05 m)
- Warhead: Atlas D: Mk 2 or Mk 3 re-entry vehicle with 1.44 Mt W49 warhead; Atlas E, F: Mk 4 re-entry vehicle with 3.75 Mt W38 warhead
- Engine: Atlas A: 2 × Rocketdyne XLR-89 booster rocket engines each with 150,000 lbf (670 kN) thrust sharing one turbopump; Atlas B, C: 1 × Rocketdyne LR-105 sustainer rocket engine, 2 × Rocketdyne XLR-89 booster rocket engines each with 150,000 lbf (670 kN) thrust sharing one turbopump; Atlas D, E, F, G: 1 × Rocketdyne LR-105 sustainer rocket engine, 2 × LR89 booster engines each with 165,000 lbf (730 kN) thrust with independent turbopumps; + Atlas A, B, C, D, E, F, G: 2 × Rocketdyne LR-101 vernier engines with 1,000 lbf (4.4 kN) of thrust fed by LR-105 sustainer engine turbopump(s)
- Accuracy: CEP 4,600 ft (1,400 m)

The SM-65 Atlas was the first operational intercontinental ballistic missile (ICBM) developed by the United States and the first member of the Atlas rocket family. It was built for the U.S. Air Force by the Convair Division of General Dynamics at an assembly plant located in Kearny Mesa, San Diego.

The development of the Atlas began in 1946, but over the next few years the project underwent several cancellations and re-starts. The deepening of the Cold War and intelligence showing the Soviet Union was working on an ICBM design led to it becoming a crash project in late 1952, along with the creation of several other missile projects to ensure one would enter service as soon as possible. The first test launch occurred on June 11, 1957, and was aborted shortly after launch due to a pitchover event. The first success of the Soviet R-7 Semyorka in August gave the program new urgency, leading to the first successful Atlas A launch on December 17, 1957. Of the eight flights of the A model, only three were successful, but the later models demonstrated increasing reliability and the D model was cleared for use.

Atlas C was declared operational in September 1959. Even at that time it was considered less than ideal as it had to be fuelled immediately before launch and thus had very slow reaction times. The Air Force still saw its strategic bombers as its primary force and considered Atlas as a last-ditch weapon that would ensure a counterattack in the case the Soviets attempted a sneak attack on the US bomber bases. The initial versions were stored at ground level and thus subject to attack by Soviet bombers, which greatly reduced their suitability for this role. Starting with the F models they were stored in underground silos that offered some protection from air attack. New designs, especially the Minuteman, rendered Atlas obsolete and it was retired from the ICBM role by 1965.

These disadvantages had no bearing on its use for space launches, and Atlas-derived launch vehicles served as launchers for NASA for four decades. Even before its ICBM use ended in 1965, Atlas had placed four Project Mercury astronauts in orbit and was becoming the foundation for a family of successful space launch vehicles, most notably Atlas Agena and Atlas Centaur. Mergers led to the acquisition of the Atlas Centaur line by the United Launch Alliance. Today ULA supports the larger Atlas V, which combines the Centaur upper stage with a new booster. Until 1995, many retired Atlas ICBMs were refurbished and combined with upper stages to launch satellites.

== History ==
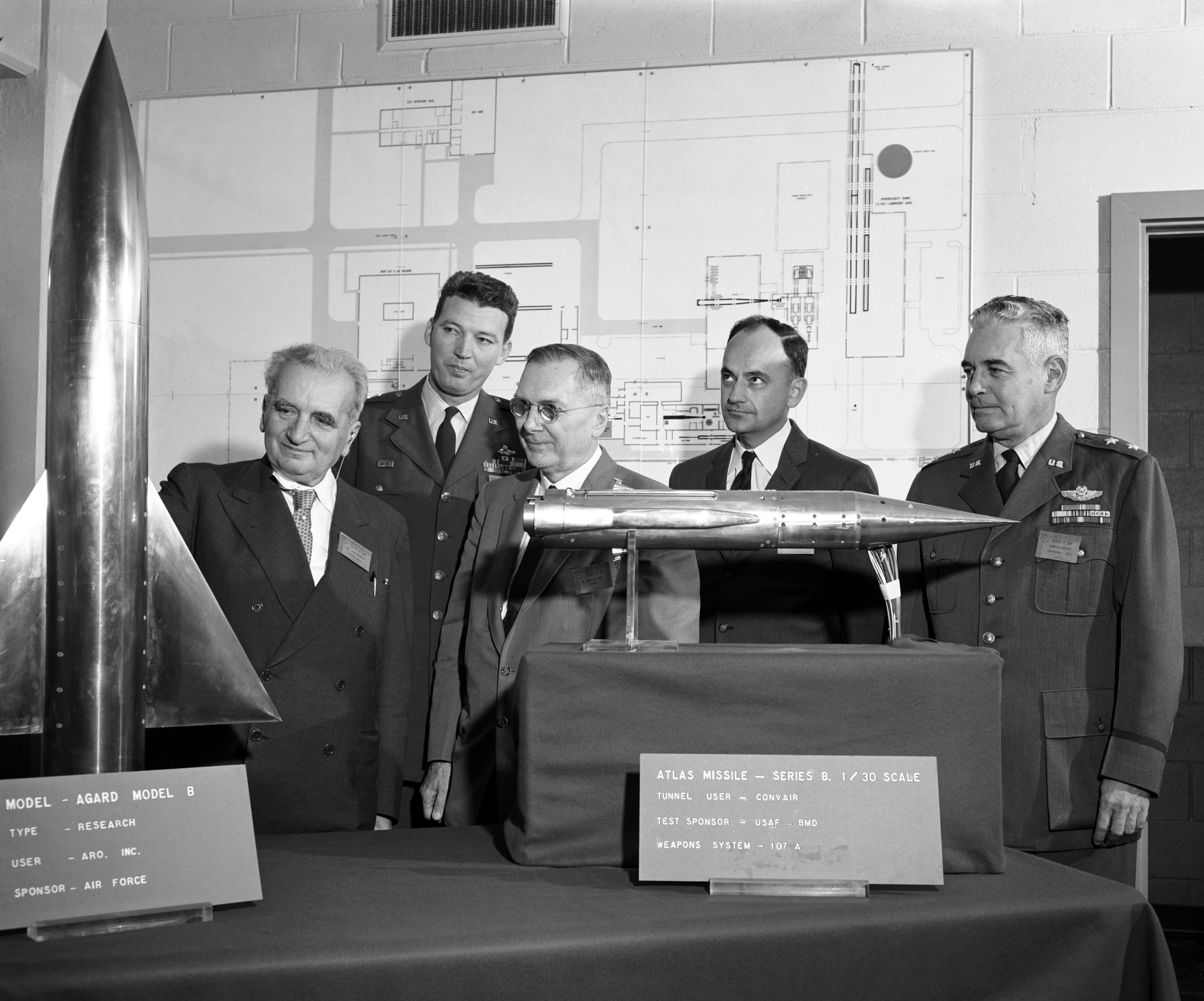
Theodore von Kármán, left, is joined by Air Force and NASA officials while inspecting two of the models used in the high velocity, high altitude wind tunnels at Arnold Air Force Base. The missiles are AGARD-B and Atlas Series-B. (1959)

Atlas was the first US ICBM and one of the first large liquid-fueled rockets. As such, its early development was quite chaotic, with plans changing rapidly as flight tests revealed issues.

Atlas began in 1946 with the award of an Army Air Forces research contract to a then AVCO-owned Convair for the study of a 1,500-to-5,000-mile (2,400 to 8,000 km) range missile that might at some future date carry a nuclear warhead. This MX-774 project would go on to acquire the name Atlas, a god in Greek mythology, in 1951, from the Atlas Corporation, Convair’s parent since 1947.

At the onset of the project, the smallest atomic warheads were all larger than the maximum theoretical payloads of the planned long range missiles, so the contract was canceled in 1947, but the Army Air Forces allowed Convair to use the remaining contract funds to launch the three almost-completed research vehicles. The three flights were only partially successful, but did show that balloon tanks and gimbaled rocket engines were valid concepts.

A second development contract was awarded to Convair on 23 January 1951 for what was then called MX-1593, with a relatively low priority. The initial design completed by Convair in 1953 was larger than the missile that eventually entered service. Estimated warhead weight was lowered from 8,000 lb (3,630 kg) to 3,000 lb (1,360 kg) based on highly favorable U.S. nuclear warhead tests in early 1954. This, in addition to the Soviet Union's 1953 Joe 4 dry fuel thermonuclear weapon test and the CIA learning that the Soviet ICBM program was making progress, led to the project being dramatically accelerated. Project Atlas was assigned the highest Air Force development priority on 14 May 1954 by General Thomas D. White.

A major development and test contract was awarded to Convair on 14 January 1955 for a 10-foot (3 m) diameter missile to weigh about 250,000 lb (113,400 kg). Atlas development was tightly controlled by the Air Force's Western Development Division, WDD, later part of the Air Force Ballistic Missile Division. Contracts for warhead, guidance and propulsion were handled separately by WDD. The first successful flight of a highly instrumented Atlas missile to full range occurred 28 November 1958. Atlas ICBMs were deployed operationally from 31 October 1959 to 12 April 1965.

The missile was originally designated as the XB-65 experimental bomber; in 1955 it was redesignated SM-65 ("Strategic Missile 65") and, from 1962, it became CGM-16. This letter "C" stood for "coffin" or "Container", the rocket being stored in a semi-hardened container; it was prepared for launch by being raised and fueled in the open. The Atlas-F (HGM-16) was stored vertically underground, but launched after being lifted to the surface.

By 1965, with the second-generation Titan II having reached operational status, the Atlas was obsolete as a missile system and had been phased out of military use. Many of the retired Atlas D, E, and F missiles were used for space launches until the 1990s.

WD-40, a penetrating oil found its first use as a corrosion-inhibiting coating for the outer skin of the Atlas missile.

== Missile details ==
The Atlas's complicated, unconventional design proved difficult to debug compared with rocket families such as Thor and Titan which used conventional aircraft-style structures and two stage setups. The lack of internal structure contributed to dozens of failed launches during its development. After watching Atlas Serial 7D explode shortly after its nighttime launch, Mercury astronaut Gus Grissom remarked "Are we really going to get on top of one of those things?" The numerous failures led to Atlas being dubbed an "Inter County Ballistic Missile" by missile technicians, but by 1965 most of the problems had been worked out and it became a more reliable launch vehicle. Nearly every component in the Atlas managed to fail at some point during test flights, from the engine combustion chambers to the tank pressurization system to the flight control system, but Convair engineers noted with some pride that there had never been a repeat of the same failure more than three times, and every component malfunction on an Atlas flight was figured out and resolved. Some of the repeat failures were also the result of rushed launch schedules and could have been avoided. The last major design hurdle to overcome was unstable engine thrust, which caused three Atlas missiles (Serial 51D and 48D in 1960 and Serial 27E in 1961) to explode on their launching stands.

=== Pressure stabilized tanks ===
Atlas was unusual in its use of balloon tanks for the propellants, made of very thin stainless steel with minimal or no rigid support structures, as already pioneered by the Soviet R-5 first launched in 1953. Pressure in the tanks provides the structural rigidity required for flight. An Atlas rocket would collapse under its own weight if not kept pressurized, and had to have 5 psi (34 kPa) nitrogen in the tank even when not fueled. The rocket had two small thrust chambers on the sides of the tank called vernier rockets. These provided fine adjustment of velocity and steering after the sustainer engine shut down.

=== 'Stage-and-a-half' ===
Atlas was informally classified as a "stage-and-a-half" rocket, with a central sustainer engine and set of two booster engines that were all started at launch, each drawing from a single set of propellant tanks. Most multistage rockets drop both engines and fuel tanks simultaneously before firing the next stage's engines. However, when the Atlas missile was being developed, there was doubt as to whether a rocket engine could be air-started. Therefore, the decision was made to ignite all of the Atlas' engines at launch; the booster engines would be discarded, while the sustainer continued to burn. A stage of a liquid propellant rocket normally consists of both propellant tanks and engines, so jettisoning one or more engines only is equivalent to "half a stage". At staging, the booster engines would be shut off and a series of mechanical and hydraulic mechanisms would close the plumbing lines to them. The booster section would then be released by a series of hydraulic clamps (aside from the early test model Atlas B, which used explosive bolts) and slide off the missile on two tracks. From there on, the sustainer and verniers would operate by themselves. Booster staging took place at roughly two minutes into launch, although the exact timing could vary considerably depending on the model of Atlas as well as the particular mission being flown. This "stage-and-a-half" design was made possible by the extremely light weight balloon tanks. The tanks made up such a small percentage of the total booster weight that the mass penalty of lifting them to orbit was less than the technical and mass penalty required to throw half of them away mid-flight. However, technology advanced quickly and not long after design work on Atlas was completed, Convair rival Martin proposed a solution to the air-starting problem. Their Titan I missile, developed as an Atlas backup, had a conventional two stage design.

=== Engines ===
The booster engine consisted of two large thrust chambers. The Atlas A/B/C/D had a single turbopump assembly and gas generator driving both booster engines; the A/B/C had an interim engine with lower thrust while the D-series had the full-up engines delivering 303,000 pounds of thrust. On the Atlas E/F, each booster engine had a separate pump and gas generator. Later space launcher variants of the Atlas used the MA-5 propulsion system with twin turbopumps on each booster engine, driven by a common gas generator. The boosters were more powerful than the sustainer engine and did most of the lifting for the first two minutes of flight. In addition to pitch and yaw control, they could also perform roll control in the event of a vernier failure. The sustainer engine on all Atlas variants consisted of a single thrust chamber with its own turbopump and gas generator, which also powered two small pressure-fed vernier engines. The verniers provided roll control and final velocity trim. The total sea level thrust of all five thrust chambers was 360,000 lb_{f} (1,600 kN) for a standard Atlas D. Atlas E/F had 375,000 pounds of thrust. Total sea level thrust for these three-engine Atlas Es and Fs was 389,000 lb_{f} (1,730 kN). Launcher variants of the Atlas often had performance enhancements to the engines.

=== Guidance ===
The Atlas missiles A through D used radio guidance: the missile sent information from its inertial system to a ground station by radio, and received course correction information in return. The Atlas E and F had completely autonomous inertial guidance systems.

The ground based guidance computer was a key part of the missile system, until guidance computers were miniaturized enough to be installed inside the missile. Isaac L. Auerbach designed the Burroughs guidance computer for the Atlas ICBM missiles. The Burroughs guidance computer was one of the first transistor computers. It processed 24-bit data using 18-bit instructions. A total of 17 of these ground computers were delivered. These same ground computers were later used for Atlas-Able, Project Mercury, and other early spacecraft.

=== Warhead ===
The warhead of the Atlas D was originally the G.E. Mk 2 "heat sink" re-entry vehicle (RV) with a W49 thermonuclear weapon, combined weight 3,700 lb (1,680 kg) and yield of 1.44 megatons (Mt). The W49 was later placed in a Mk 3 ablative RV, combined weight 2,420 lb (1,100 kg). The Atlas E and F had an AVCO Mk 4 RV containing a W38 thermonuclear warhead with a yield of 3.75 Mt which was fuzed for either air burst or contact burst. The Mk 4 RV also deployed penetration aids in the form of mylar balloons which replicated the radar signature of the Mk 4 RV. The Mk 4 plus W-38 had a combined weight of 4,050 lb (1,840 kg). All of the warheads deployed in the Atlas were over 100 times more powerful than the bomb dropped over Nagasaki in 1945.

=== Comparison with R-7 ===
The R-7 Semyorka was the first Soviet ICBM and similarly started all engines before launch to avoid igniting a large liquid fuel engine at high altitudes. However, the R-7 had a central sustainer section, with four boosters attached to its sides. The large side boosters required use of an expensive launch pad and prevented launching the rocket from a silo. Like the Atlas, the use of cryogenic liquid oxygen meant that the missile could not be kept in the state of flight readiness indefinitely, was largely useless as a strategic weapon, and was similarly developed into a space launch vehicle, initially delivering Sputnik and Vostok into orbit. The Soyuz rocket is descended from the R-7 and remains in use today.

== Missile versions ==
=== SM-65A Atlas ===
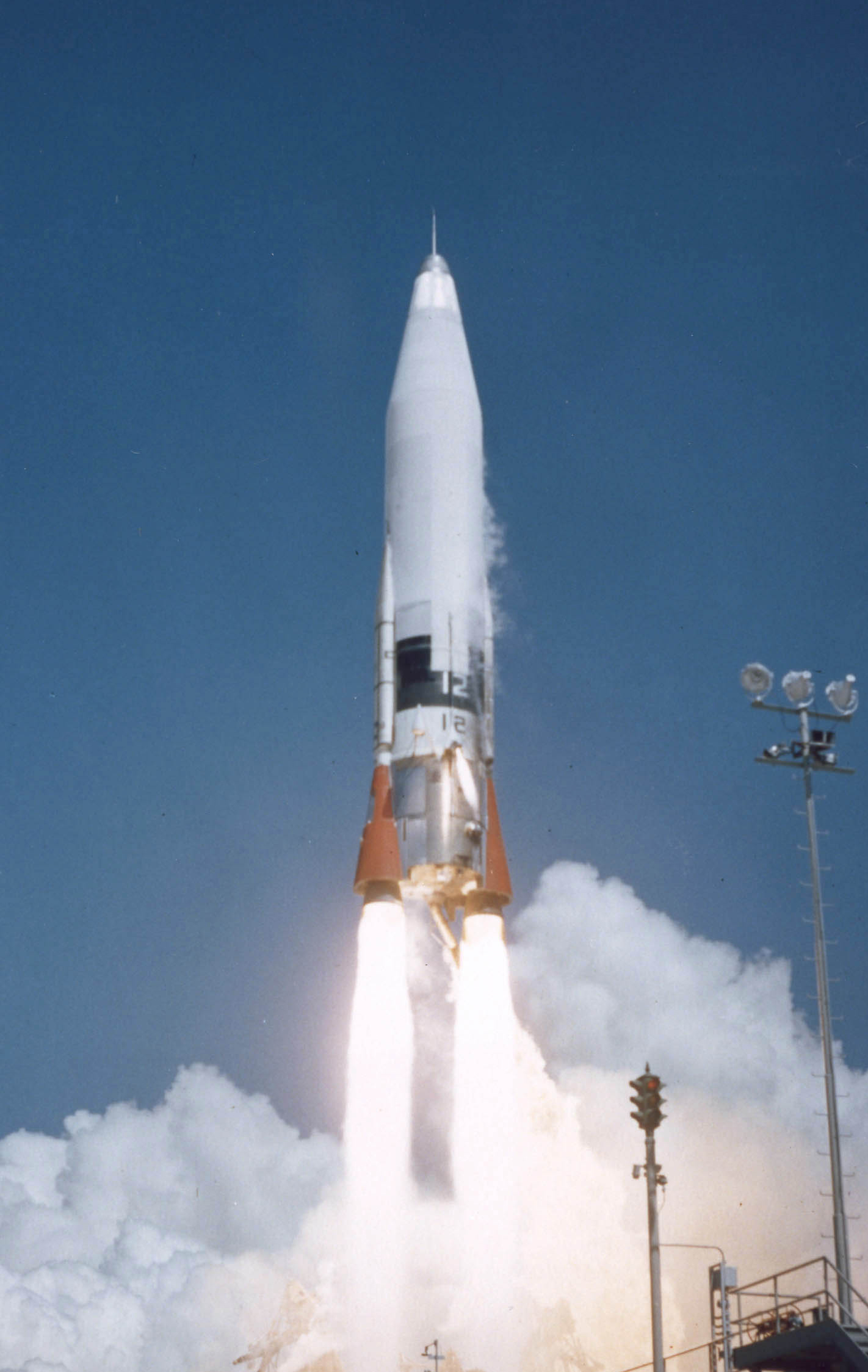
Atlas, test number 449, Air Force Missile Test Center.

The Convair X-11/SM-65A Atlas/Atlas A was the first full-scale prototype of the Atlas missile, first flying on 11 June 1957. It was a test model designed to verify the structure and propulsion system, and had no sustainer engine or separable stages. The first three Atlas A launches used an early Rocketdyne engine design with conical thrust chambers and only 135,000 pounds of thrust. By the fourth Atlas test, they were replaced by an improved engine design that had bell-shaped thrust chambers and 150,000 pounds of thrust.

There were eight Atlas A test flights, conducted in 1957–58, of which four were successful. All were launched from Cape Canaveral Air Force Station, at either Launch Complex 12 or Launch Complex 14.

=== SM-65B Atlas ===
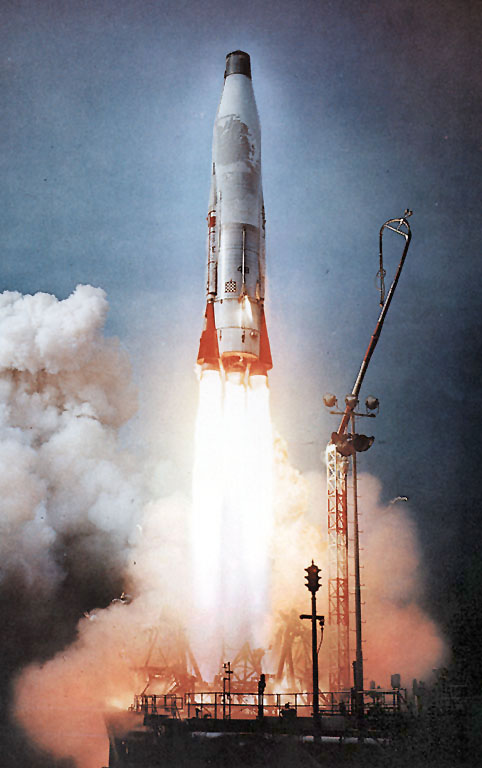
Launch of an Atlas B ICBM.

The Convair X-12/SM-65B was the second prototype version, introducing the stage and a half system that was a hallmark of the Atlas rocket program. This version was the first American rocket to achieve a flight distance that could be considered intercontinental when it flew 6,325 miles (10,180 km).

The Atlas B was first flown on 19 July 1958. Of ten total flights, nine were sub-orbital test flights of the Atlas as an Intercontinental Ballistic Missile, with five successful missions and four failures; the other flight placed the SCORE satellite into orbit. All launches were conducted from Cape Canaveral Air Force Station, at Launch Complexes 11, 13 and 14.

=== SM-65C Atlas ===
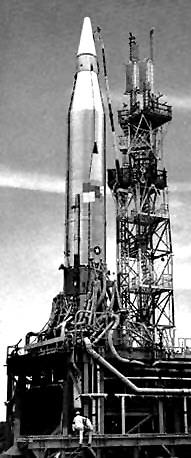
Atlas C missile sitting on its launch pad.

The SM-65C Atlas, or Atlas C was the third prototype Atlas version, a more refined model with improved, lighter-weight components. a bigger LOX tank, and a smaller fuel tank. First flown on 24 December 1958, it was the final development version. It was originally planned to be used as the first stage of the Atlas-Able rocket, but following an explosion during a static test on 24 September 1959, this was abandoned in favor of the Atlas D. Six flights were made, all sub-orbital ballistic test flights of the Atlas, with three tests succeeding, and three failing. All launches were conducted from Cape Canaveral Air Force Station, at Launch Complex 12.

=== SM-65D Atlas ===
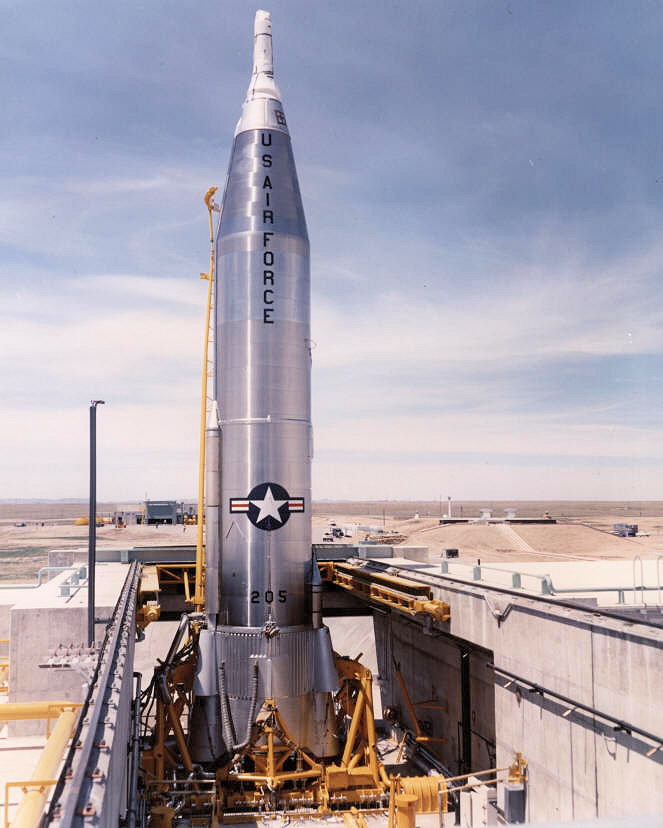
SM-65D Atlas missile 58-220, F. E. Warren AFB.

The SM-65D Atlas, or Atlas D, was the first operational version of the Atlas missile and the basis for all Atlas space launchers, debuting in 1959. Atlas D weighed 255,950 lb (116,100 kg) (without payload) and had an empty weight of only 11,894 lb (5,395 kg); the other 95.35% was propellant. Dropping the 6,720 lb (3,048 kg) booster engine and fairing reduced the dry weight to 5,174 lb (2,347 kg), a mere 2.02% of the initial gross weight of the vehicle (still excluding payload). This very low dry weight gave Atlas D a range of up to 9,000 miles (14,500 km), or to orbit payloads without requiring an upper stage. It first flew on 14 April 1959.

To provide the United States with an interim or emergency ICBM capability, in September 1959 the Air Force deployed three SM-65D Atlas missiles on open launch pads at Vandenberg AFB, California, under the operational control of the 576th Strategic Missile Squadron, 704th Strategic Missile Wing. Completely exposed to the elements, the three missiles were serviced by a gantry crane. One missile was on operational alert at all times. They remained on alert until 1 May 1964.

=== SM-65E Atlas ===
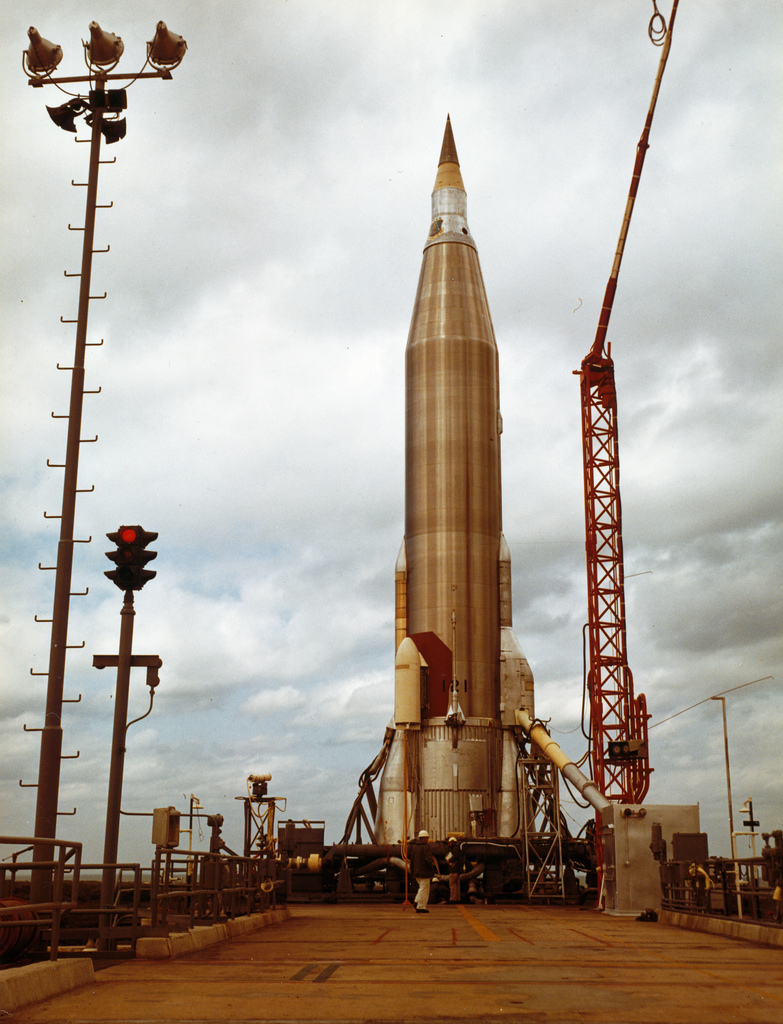
Atlas-E missile (s/n 5E), Cape Canaveral LC-11.

The SM-65E Atlas, or Atlas-E, was the first 3-engine operational variant of the Atlas missile, the third engine resulting from splitting the two booster thrust chambers into separate engines with independent sets of turbopumps. It first flew on 11 October 1960, and was deployed as an operational ICBM from September 1961 until March 1965.

A major enhancement in the Atlas E was the new all-inertial system that obviated the need for ground control facilities. Since the missiles were no longer tied to a central guidance control facility, the launchers could be dispersed more widely in what was called a 1 × 9 configuration, with one missile silo located at one launch site each for the nine missiles assigned to the squadron.

Atlas-E launches were conducted from Cape Canaveral Air Force Station, at Launch Complexes 11 and 13, and Vandenberg Air Force Base at Vandenberg AFB Operational Silo Test Facility, Vandenberg AFB Launch Complex 576 and Vandenberg AFB Space Launch Complex 3.

=== SM-65F Atlas ===
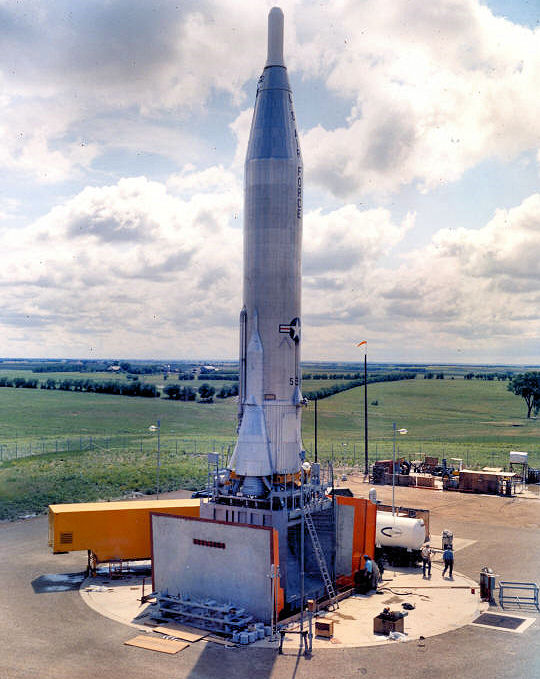
Convair SM-65F Atlas 532 550 SMS Site 02 Abilene KS.

The SM-65F Atlas, or Atlas-F, was the final operational variant of the Atlas missile. It first flew on 8 August 1961, and was deployed as an operational ICBM between September 1962 and April 1965.

The Atlas F was essentially a quick-firing version of the Atlas E, modified to be stored in a vertical position inside underground concrete and steel silos. It was nearly identical to the E version except for interfaces associated with their different basing modes (underground silo for F) and the fuel management system. When stored, the missile sat atop an elevator. If placed on alert, it was fueled with RP-1 (kerosene) liquid fuel, which could be stored inside the missile for extended periods. If a decision was made to launch, it was fueled with liquid oxygen. Once the liquid oxygen fueling was complete, the elevator raised the missile to the surface for launching.

This method of storage allowed the Atlas F to be launched in about ten minutes, a saving of about five minutes over the Atlas D and Atlas E, both of which were stored horizontally and had to be raised to a vertical position before being fueled.

Atlas-F launches were conducted from Cape Canaveral Air Force Station, at Launch Complexes 11 and 13, and Vandenberg Air Force Base at OSTF-2, Vandenberg AFB Launch Complex 576 and Vandenberg AFB Space Launch Complex 3.

== Operational deployment ==
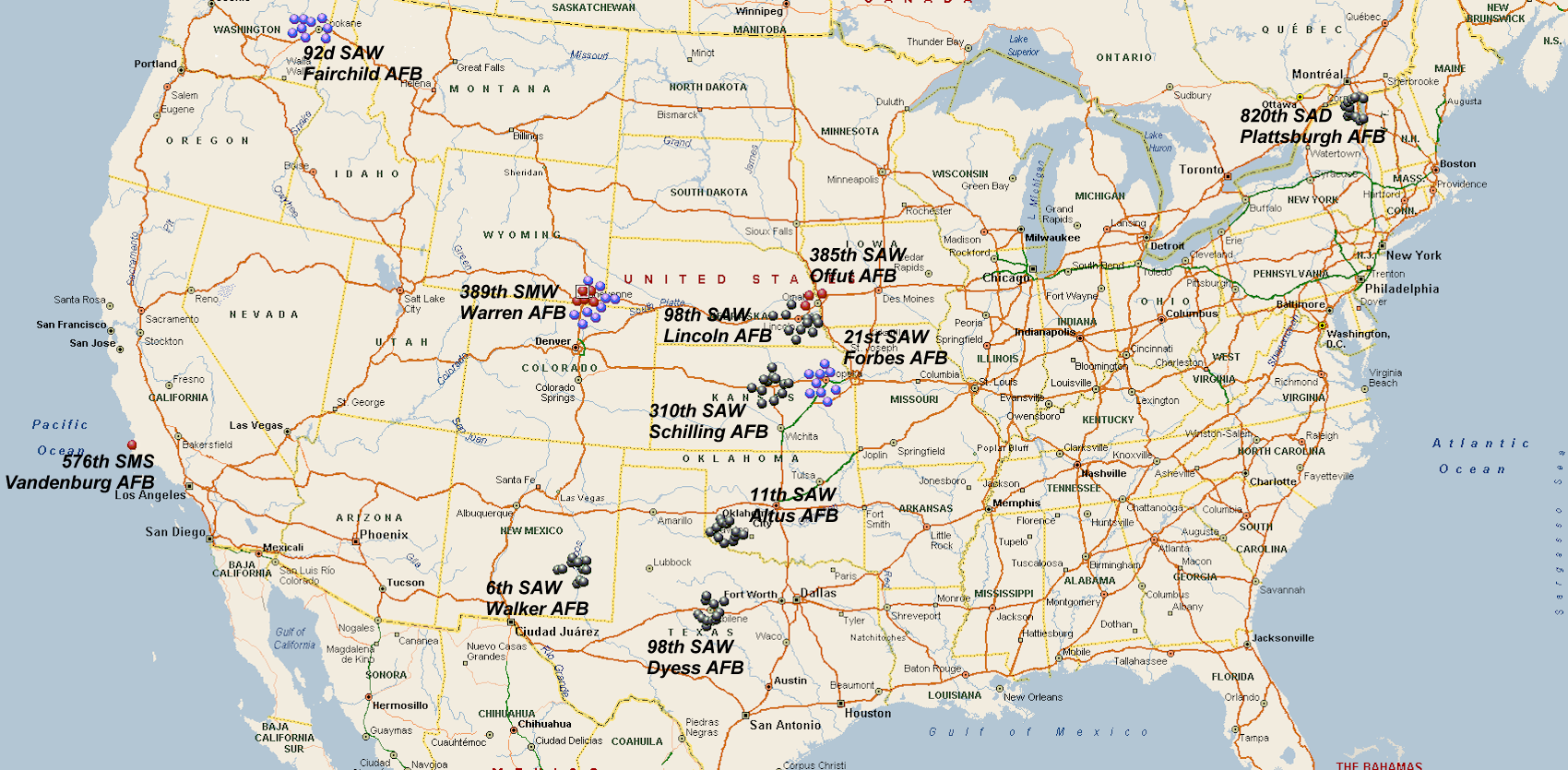
SM-65 Atlas deployment sites: SM-65D (Red), SM-65E (Purple), SM-65F (Black)

Strategic Air Command deployed 13 operational Atlas ICBM squadrons between 1959 and 1962. Each of the three missile variants, the Atlas D, E, and F series, were deployed and based in progressively more secure launchers.

=== Service history ===
The number of Atlas intercontinental ballistic missiles in service, at the end of each year:

Date	CGM-16D (Atlas D)	CGM-16E (Atlas E)	HGM-16F (Atlas F)
1959	6	0	0
1960	12	0	0
1961	30	27	0
1962	30	27	72
1963	20	27	72
1964	0	0	72

=== Atlas-D deployment ===
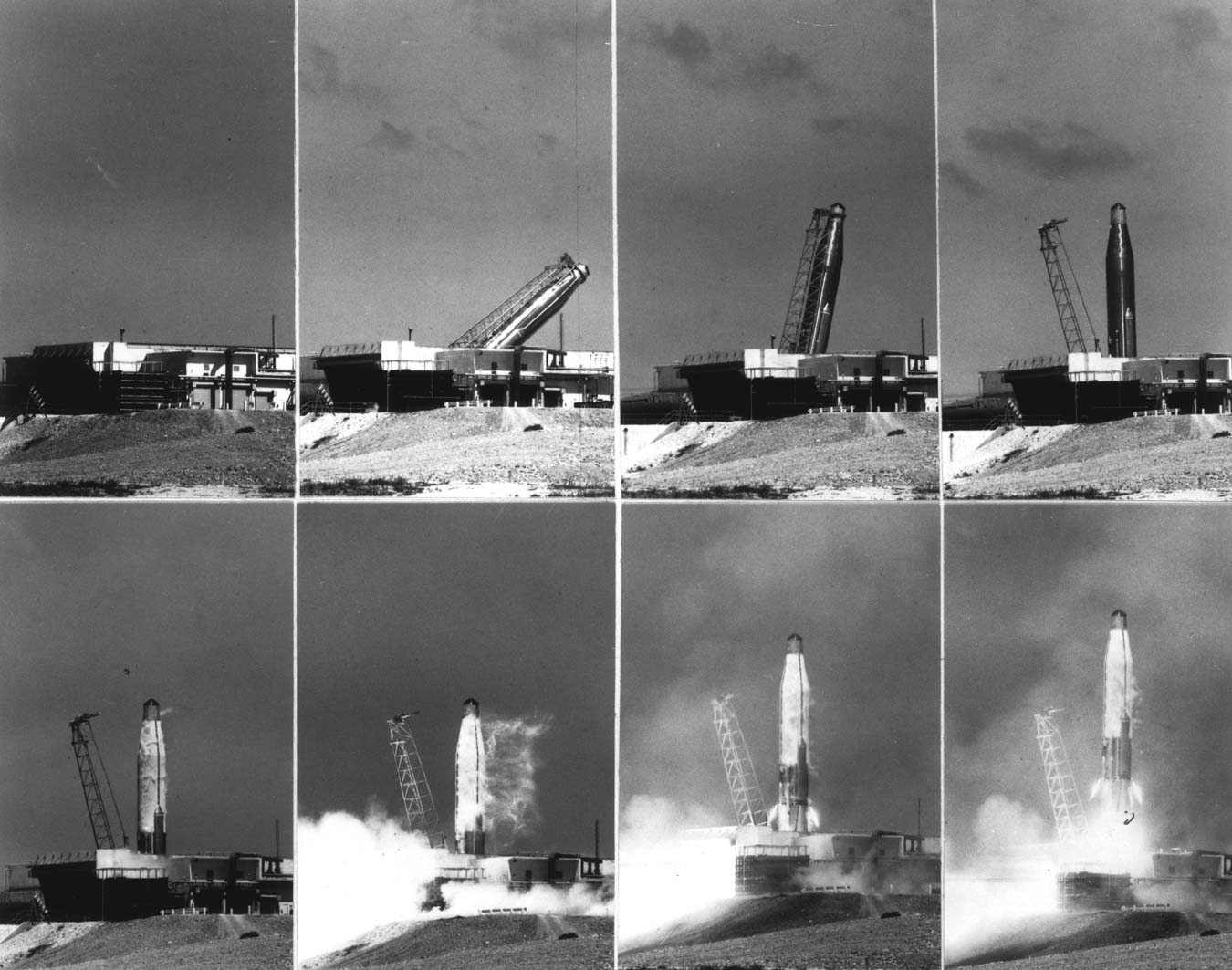
Atlas-D ICBM launching from semi-hardened "coffin" bunker at Vandenberg AFB, California.

In September 1959 the first operational Atlas ICBM squadron went on operational alert at F.E. Warren AFB, Wyoming equipped with six SM-65D Atlas missiles based in above-ground launchers. Three additional Atlas D squadrons, two near F.E. Warren AFB, Wyoming, and one at Offutt AFB, Nebraska, were based in above-ground launchers that provided blast protection against over-pressures of only 5 pounds per square inch (34 kPa). These units were:

- 389th Strategic Missile Wing

Francis E. Warren AFB, Wyoming (2 September 1960 – 1 July 1964)
564th Strategic Missile Squadron (6 missiles)
565th Strategic Missile Squadron (9 missiles)

- 385th Bombardment (later Strategic Aerospace) Wing

Offutt AFB, Nebraska (30 March 1961 – 1 October 1964)
549th Strategic Missile Squadron (9 missiles)

The first site at Warren for the 564th SMS consisted of six launchers grouped together, controlled by two launch operations buildings, and clustered around a central guidance control facility. This was called the 3 × 2 configuration: two launch complexes of three missiles each constituted a squadron.

At the second Warren site for the 565th SMS and at Offutt AFB, Nebraska, for the 549th SMS, the missiles were based in a 3 x 3 configuration: three launchers and one combined guidance control/launch facility constituted a launch complex, and three complexes comprised a squadron. At these later sites the combined guidance and control facility measured 107 by 121 ft (33 by 37 m) with a partial basement. A dispersal technique of spreading the launch complexes were 20 to 30 miles (30 to 50 km) apart was also employed to reduce the risk that one powerful nuclear warhead could destroy multiple launch sites.

=== Atlas-E deployment ===
The SM-65E Atlas were based in horizontal "semi-hard" or "coffin" facilities that protected the missile against over-pressures up to 25 psi (170 kPa). In this arrangement the missile, its support facilities, and the launch operations building were housed in reinforced concrete structures that were buried underground; only the roofs protruded above ground level. These units were:

- 92nd Bombardment (later Strategic Aerospace) Wing

Fairchild Air Force Base, Washington (28 September 1961 – 17 February 1965)
567th Strategic Missile Squadron, (9 missiles)

- 21st Strategic Aerospace Division

Forbes AFB, Kansas (10 October 1961 – 4 January 1965)
548th Strategic Missile Squadron, (9 missiles)

- 389th Strategic Missile Wing

Francis E. Warren AFB, Wyoming (20 November 1961 – 4 January 1965)
566th Strategic Missile Squadron (9 missiles)

=== Atlas-F deployment ===
The six SM-65F Atlas squadrons were the first ICBMs to be stored vertically in underground silos. Built of heavily reinforced concrete, the huge silos were designed to protect the missiles from over-pressures of up to 100 psi (690 kPa). These units were:

- 310th Bombardment (later Strategic Aerospace) Wing

Schilling AFB, Kansas (9 September 1962 – 1 February 1965)
550th Strategic Missile Squadron (12 missiles)

- 98th Strategic Aerospace Wing

Lincoln AFB, Nebraska (15 September 1962 – 10 March 1965)
551st Strategic Missile Squadron (12 missiles)

- 11th Bombardment (later Strategic Aerospace) Wing

Altus AFB, Oklahoma (9 October 1962 – 30 December 1964)
577th Strategic Missile Squadron (12 missiles)

- 96th Bombardment (later Strategic Aerospace) Wing

Dyess AFB, Texas (15 November 1962 – 1 December 1964)
578th Strategic Missile Squadron (12 missiles)

- 6th Bombardment (later Strategic Aerospace) Wing

Walker AFB, New Mexico (30 November 1962 – 5 January 1965)
579th Strategic Missile Squadron (12 missiles)

- 820th Air (later Strategic Aerospace) Division

Plattsburgh AFB, New York (20 December 1962 – 12 March 1965)
556th Strategic Missile Squadron (12 missiles)

The Atlas F's employment was dangerous due to the flammability of the stored liquid rocket fuels. Four sites and their missiles were destroyed during propellant loading exercises (known as PLXs) when liquid oxygen leaked and fires ensued. On 1 June 1963 Roswell's site 579-1 was destroyed by explosion and fire. On 13 February 1964 Roswell's site 579-5 was destroyed, and a month later on 9 March 1964 site 579-2 was also destroyed by explosion and fire. Finally, on 14 May 1964 an Altus AFB site, 577-6 in Frederick, Oklahoma, was also destroyed by explosion and fire during a PLX. Fortunately the crews all survived. None of the damaged sites were repaired or returned to service.

=== Retirement as an ICBM ===
After the solid-fuel LGM-30 Minuteman had become operational in early 1963, the Atlas became rapidly obsolete. By October 1964, all Atlas D missiles had been phased out, followed by the Atlas E/F in April 1965. About 350 Atlas ICBMs of all versions were built, with a peak deployment level of 129 (30 D, 27 E, 72 F). Despite its relatively short life span, Atlas served as the proving ground for many new missile technologies. Perhaps more importantly, its development spawned the organization, policies, and procedures that paved the way for all of the later ICBM programs.

After its retirement from operational ICBM service in 1965, the ICBMs were refurbished and used for close to forty years as space launch vehicle boosters.

== Atlas-A to -C launch history ==
=== SM-65A (Atlas A) variant launch history ===
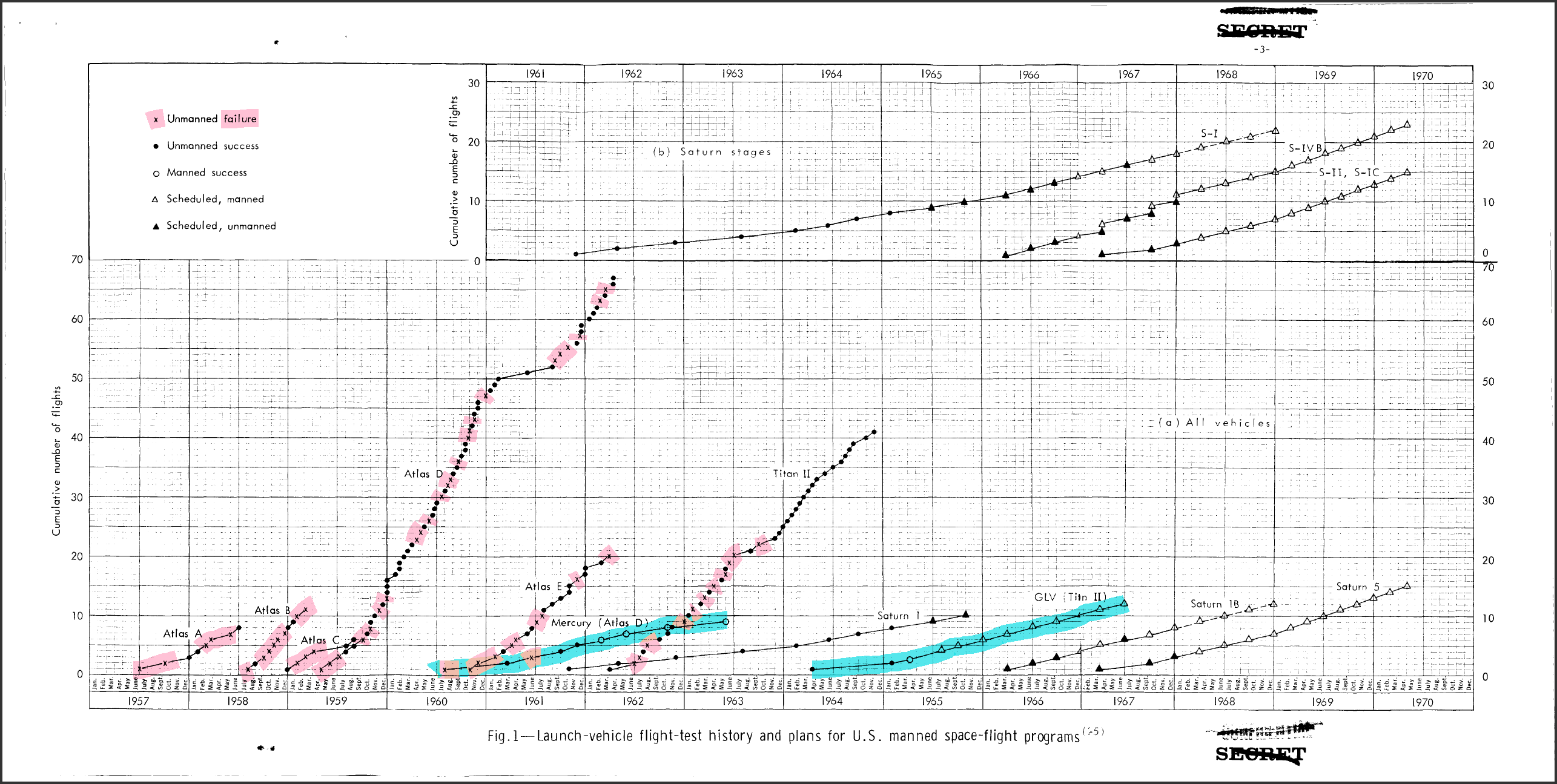
1965 graph of Atlas launches, cumulative by month with failures highlighted (pink) along with USAF Titan II and NASA use of ICBM boosters for Projects Mercury and Gemini (blue). Apollo–Saturn history and projections shown as well.

Eight flights of Atlas A occurred during the history of this variant.

(SM-65A) Date	Time (GMT)	Pad	Serial	Apogee	Outcome
1957-06-11	19:37	LC-14	4A	2 km (1.2 mi)	Failure
1957-09-25	19:57	LC-14	6A	3 km (1.9 mi)	Failure
1957-12-17	17:39	LC-14	12A	120 km (75 mi)	Success
1958-01-10	15:48	LC-12	10A	120 km (75 mi)	Success
1958-02-07	19:37	LC-14	13A	120 km (75 mi)	Failure
1958-02-20	17:46	LC-12	11A	90 km (56 mi)	Failure
1958-04-05	17:01	LC-14	15A	100 km (62 mi)	Success
1958-06-03	21:28	LC-12	16A	120 km (75 mi)	Success

=== SM-65B (Atlas B) variant launch history ===
Ten flights of Atlas B occurred during the history of this variant.

(SM-65B) Date	Time (GMT)	Pad	Serial	Apogee	Outcome	Remarks
1958-07-19	17:36	LC-11	3B	10 km (6.2 mi)	Failure	
1958-08-02	22:16	LC-13	4B	900 km (560 mi)	Success	
1958-08-29	04:30	LC-11	5B	900 km (560 mi)	Success	
1958-09-14	05:24	LC-14	8B	900 km (560 mi)	Success	
1958-09-18	21:27	LC-13	6B	100 km (62 mi)	Failure	
1958-11-18	04:00	LC-11	9B	800 km (500 mi)	Failure	
1958-11-29	02:27	LC-14	12B	900 km (560 mi)	Success	First full-range test flight
1958-12-18	22:02	LC-11	10B	N/A	Success	Placed SCORE satellite into 185 km (115 mi) x 1,484 km (922 mi) x 32.3° orbit
1959-01-16	04:00	LC-14	13B	100 km (62 mi)	Failure	
1959-02-04	08:01	LC-11	11B	900 km (560 mi)	Success	

=== SM-65C (Atlas C) variant launch history ===
Six flights of Atlas C occurred during the history of this variant.

(SM-65C) Date	Time (GMT)	Pad	Serial	Apogee	Outcome
1958-12-24	04:45	LC-12	3C	900 km (560 mi)	Success
1959-01-27	23:34	LC-12	4C	900 km (560 mi)	Failure
1959-02-20	05:38	LC-12	5C	100 km (62 mi)	Failure
1959-03-19	00:59	LC-12	7C	200 km (120 mi)	Failure
1959-07-21	05:22	LC-12	8C	900 km (560 mi)	Success
1959-08-24	15:53	LC-12	11C	900 km (560 mi)	Success

== Survivors ==
- HGM-16F Atlas is on display at the National Museum of the United States Air Force in Dayton, Ohio. For years the missile was displayed outside the museum. In 1998 it was removed from display. It was restored by the museum's restoration staff and returned to display in the museum's new Missile Silo Gallery in 2007. The stage is currently in storage at the museum. The white nose cone atop the museum's Atlas is an AVCO IV re-entry vehicle built to contain a nuclear warhead. This nose cone actually stood alert in defense of the United States, as it was initially installed on an Atlas on 2 October 1962 at a Denton Valley launch site near Clyde, Texas.
- Atlas 8A is displayed in front of the Strategic Air Command & Aerospace Museum in Ashland, Nebraska; reconfigured as an Atlas D.
- Atlas 2E is on display in front of the San Diego Air & Space Museum at Gillespie Field, El Cajon, California.
- Atlas 2D mounted with a Mercury capsule is on display in the Rocket Garden at the Kennedy Space Center Visitor Complex, Merritt Island, Florida
- Atlas 10F is on display at the U.S. Space & Rocket Center in Huntsville, Alabama.

Former survivor:

- Atlas 5A (56–6742) was formerly on display on the lawn in front of the Canada Science and Technology Museum in Ottawa, Ontario, Canada, but was removed in February 2015 and dismantled.
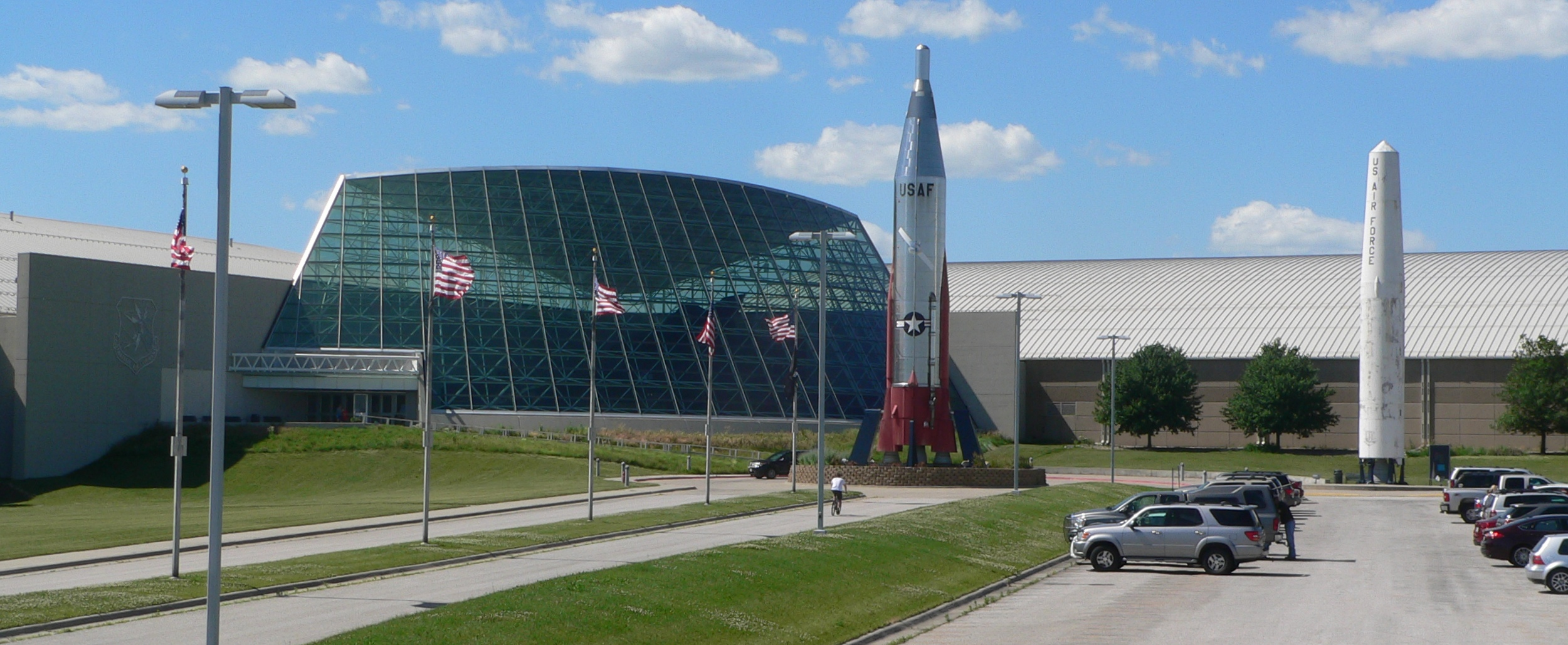
Atlas 8A, Strategic Air Command & Aerospace Museum (reconfigured as Atlas D)

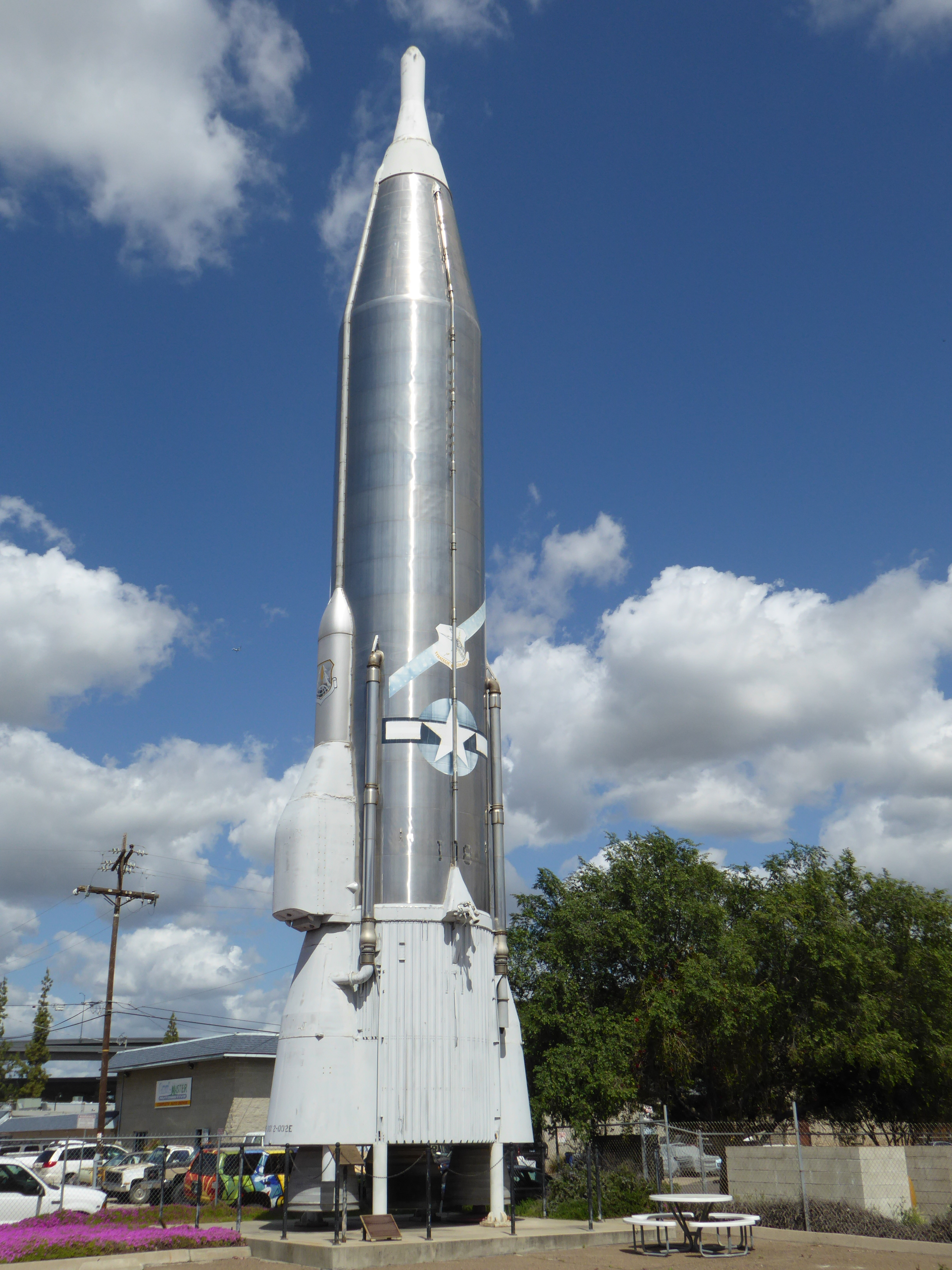
Atlas 2E, San Diego Air & Space Museum, Gillespie Field

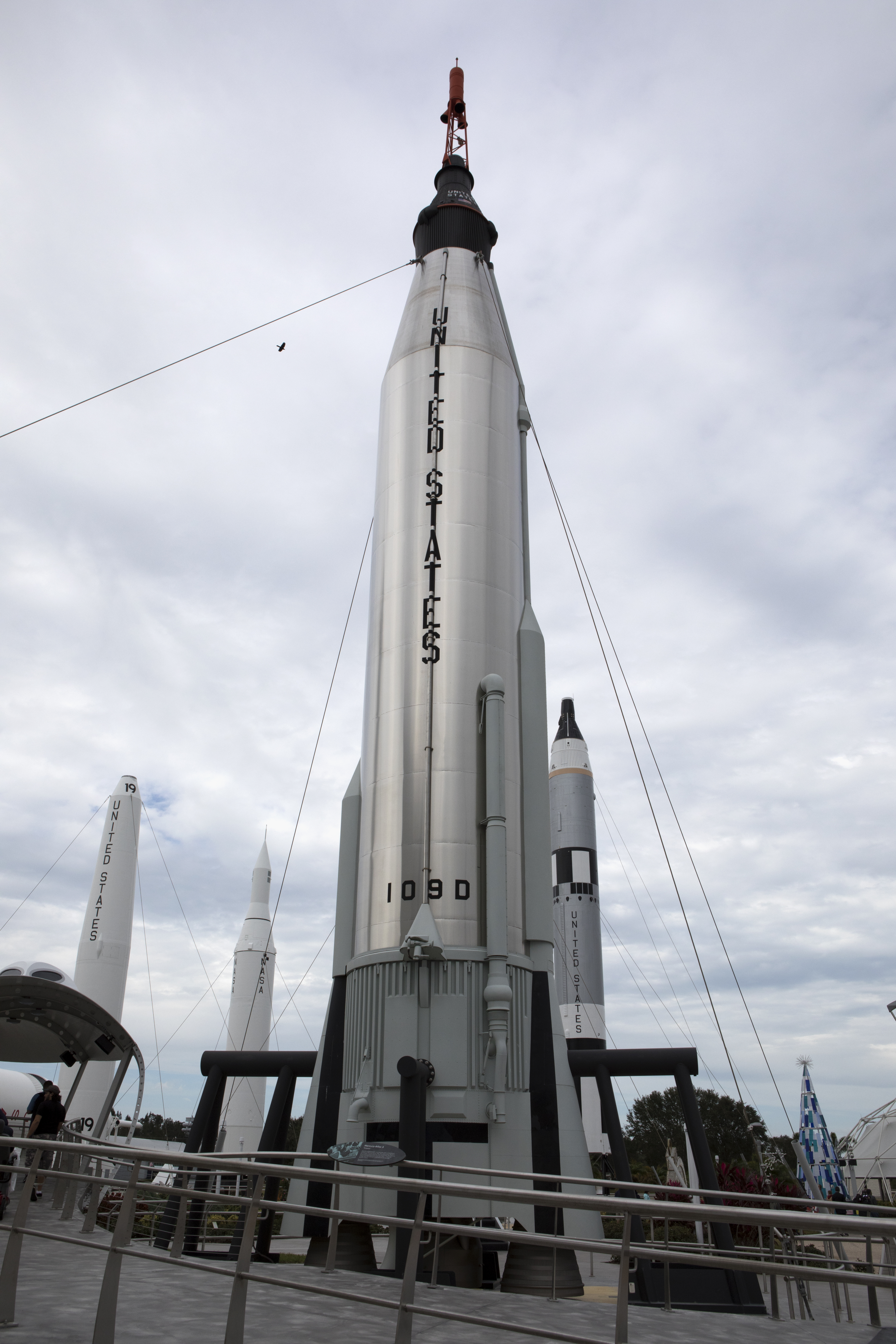
Atlas 2D, Kennedy Space Center Visitor Complex (mounted with a Mercury capsule)

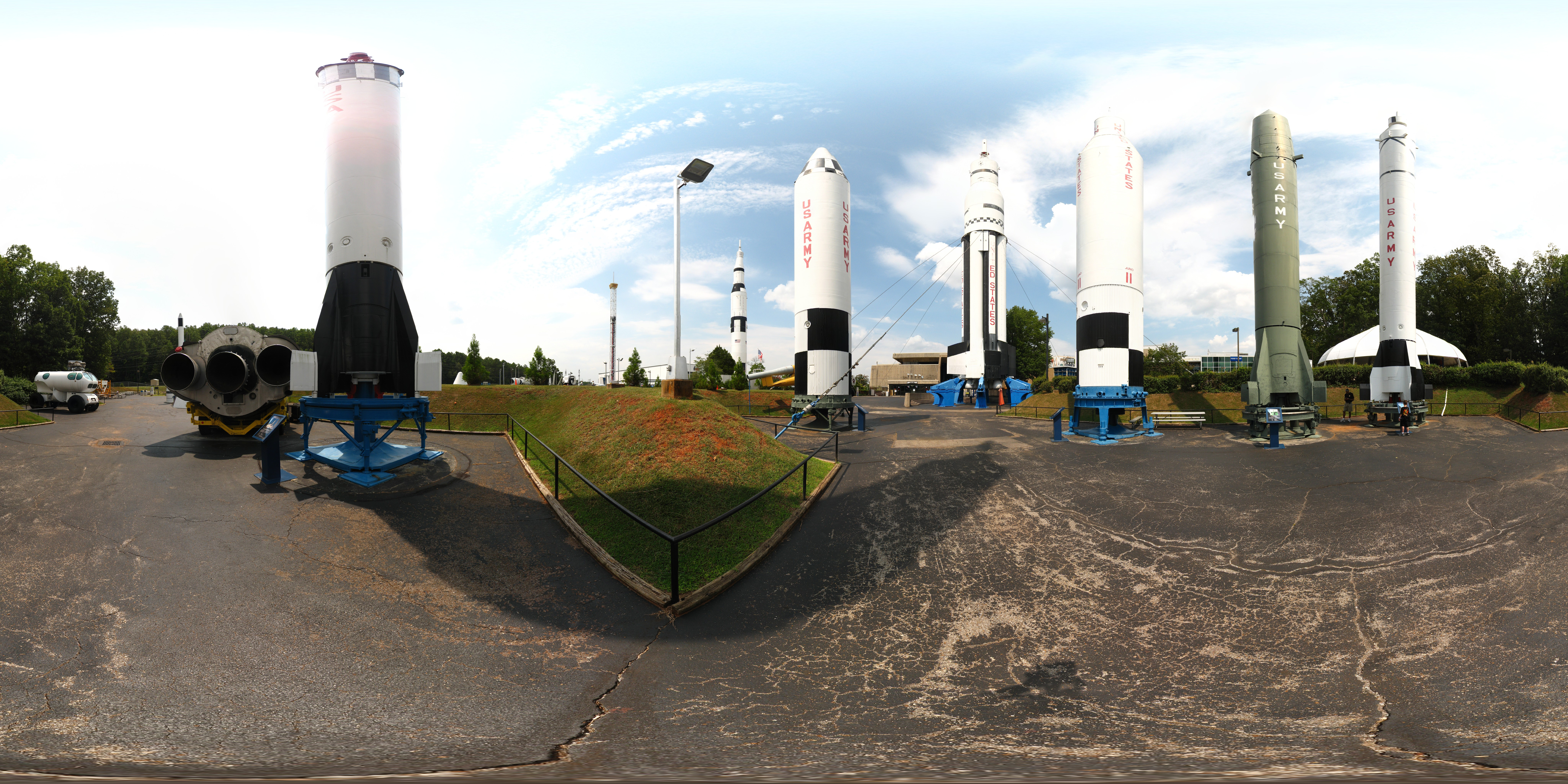
Atlas 10F, U.S. Space & Rocket Center (left, on transporter)

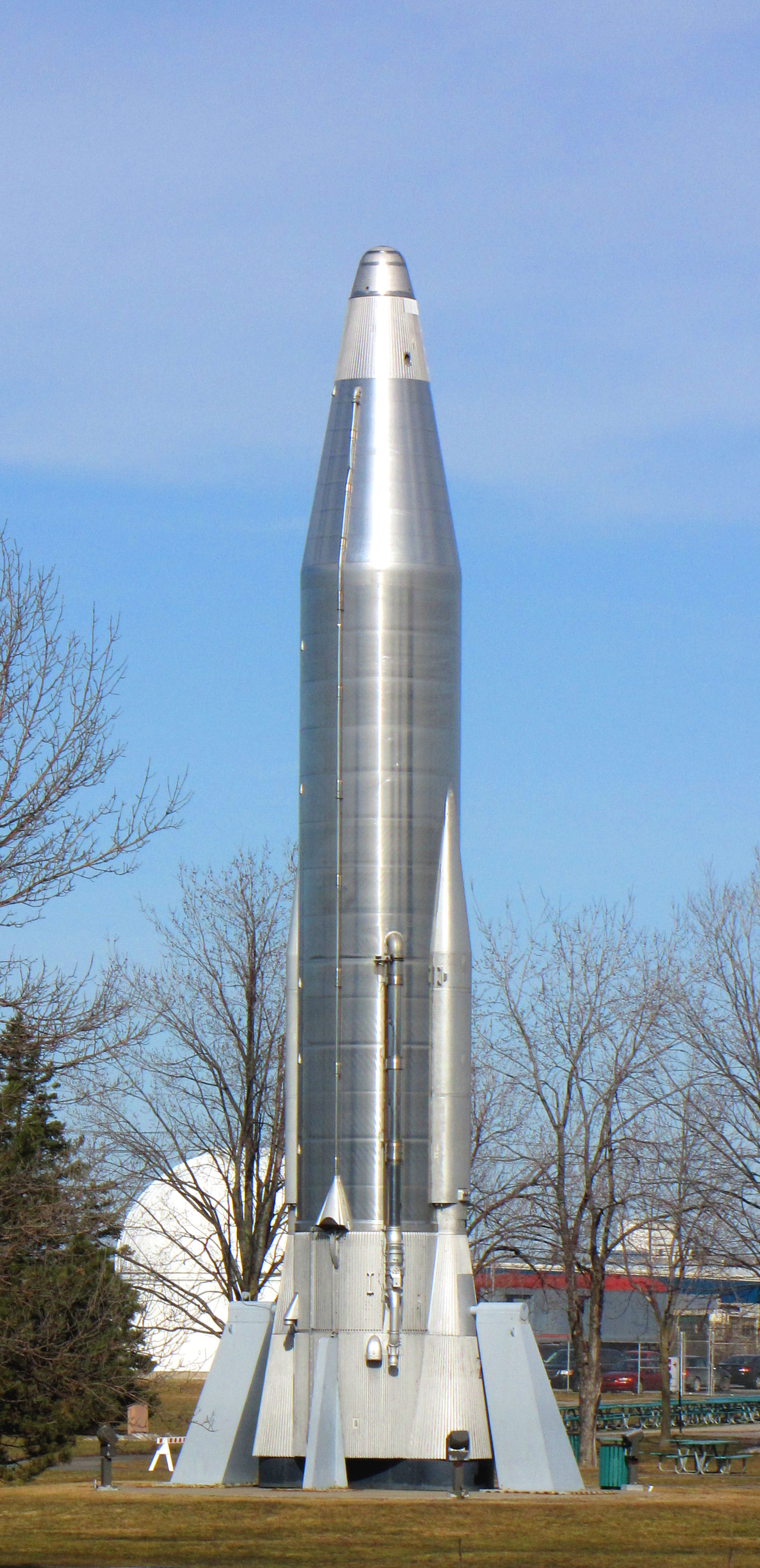
Atlas 5A (56–6742), Canada Science and Technology Museum

== Gallery ==
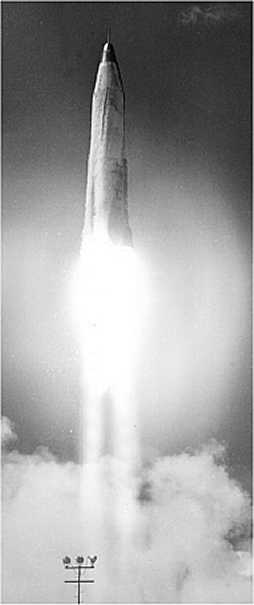
Convair XSM-65A being launched

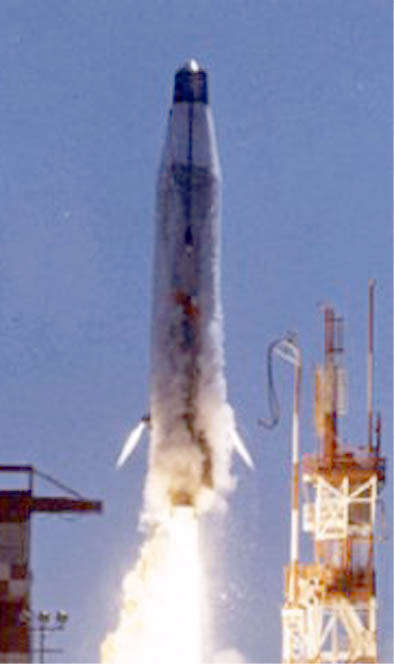
Convair XSM-65B being launched

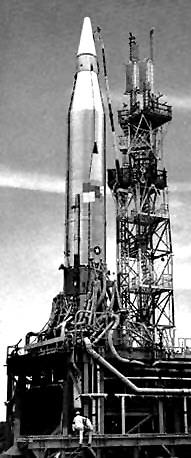
Atlas C missile sitting on its launch pad, 1957/58

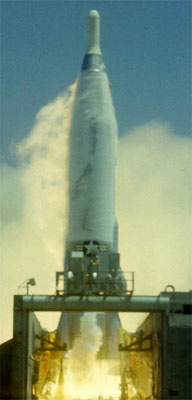
Launch of an SM-65E Atlas

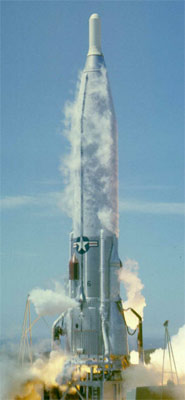
Launch of an SM-65F Atlas

=== Video resources ===
"Atlas: The ICBM" (1957) De-classified USAF information film reel.

"On Target, The Atlas ICBM" (1958).

"Atlas: Ready" (1960).

== See also ==
- Strategic Air Command

Aircraft of comparable role, configuration, and era

- Soviet R-7 (later Soyuz) family
- SM-68 Titan I
- SM-68 Titan II

Related lists

- List of military aircraft of the United States
- List of missiles
