= List of Atlas launches =

Launches of American rocket family

This is a list of launches made by the Atlas rocket family, derived from the SM-65 Atlas ICBM. The currently operational variant, Atlas V, has flown 100 consecutive missions without failure between October 2007 and July 2026.

In August 2021, ULA announced that Atlas V would be retired, and all remaining launches had been sold. As of July 2026, 6 launches remain, all of which are Starliner missions.

Due to the size of the list, it has been split by decade:

- List of Atlas launches (1957–1959)
- List of Atlas launches (1960–1969)
- List of Atlas launches (1970–1979)
- List of Atlas launches (1980–1989)
- List of Atlas launches (1990–1999)
- List of Atlas launches (2000–2009), first Atlas V launch in 2002, last Atlas III launch in 2005
- List of Atlas launches (2010–2019)
- List of Atlas launches (2020–2029)

In addition, the variants Atlas LV3C and Atlas LV3B have dedicated lists.

== Statistics ==
- Failure
- Partial failure
- Success
- Scheduled

Statistics are up-to-date as of 2 July 2026.

== See also ==
- List of Falcon 9 and Falcon Heavy launches
- List of Thor and Delta launches
- List of Titan launches
