= Balloon tank =

Lightweight tank that needs to be pressurized to keep its shape

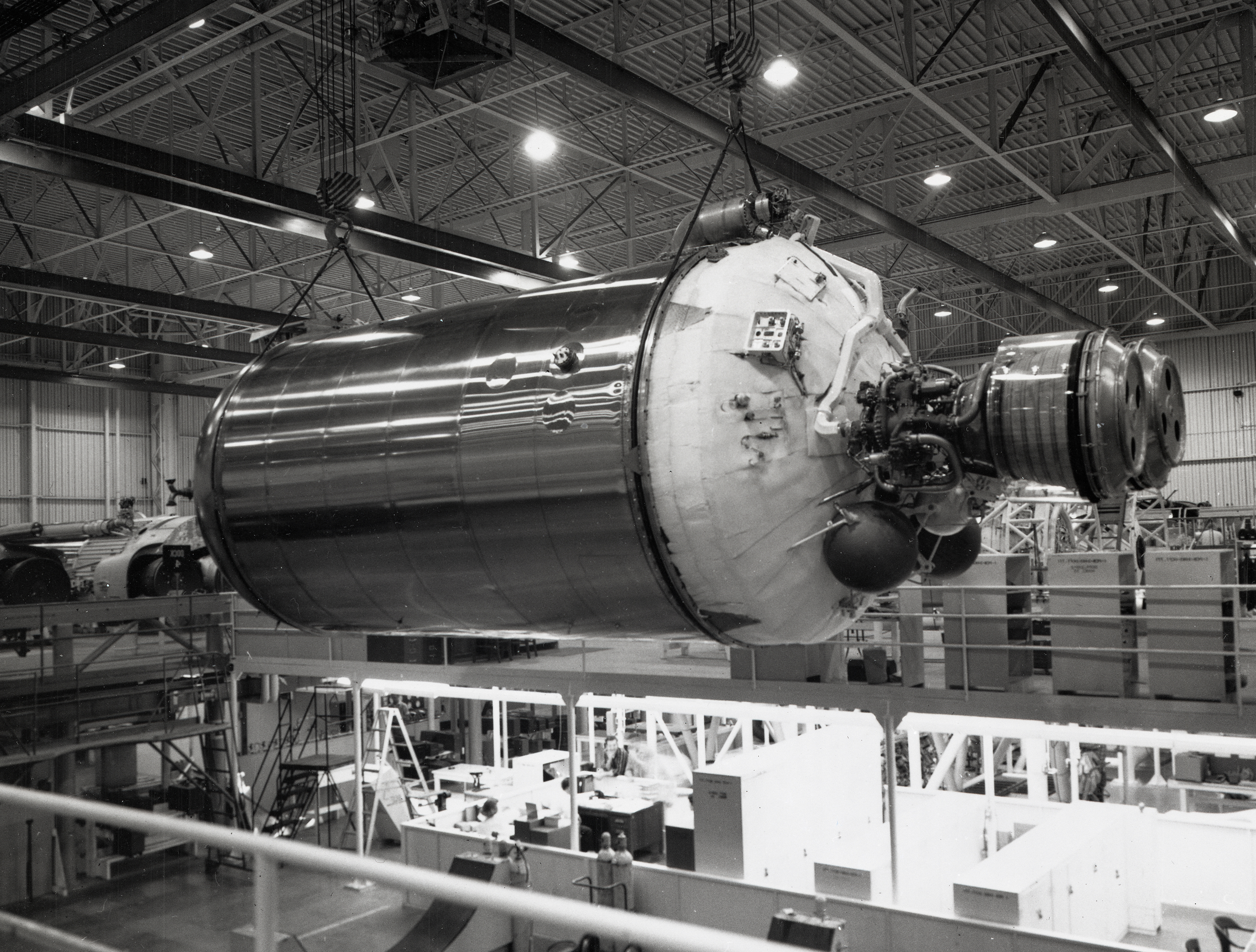
Centaur upper stage during assembly, without insulation on the exposed balloon tank.

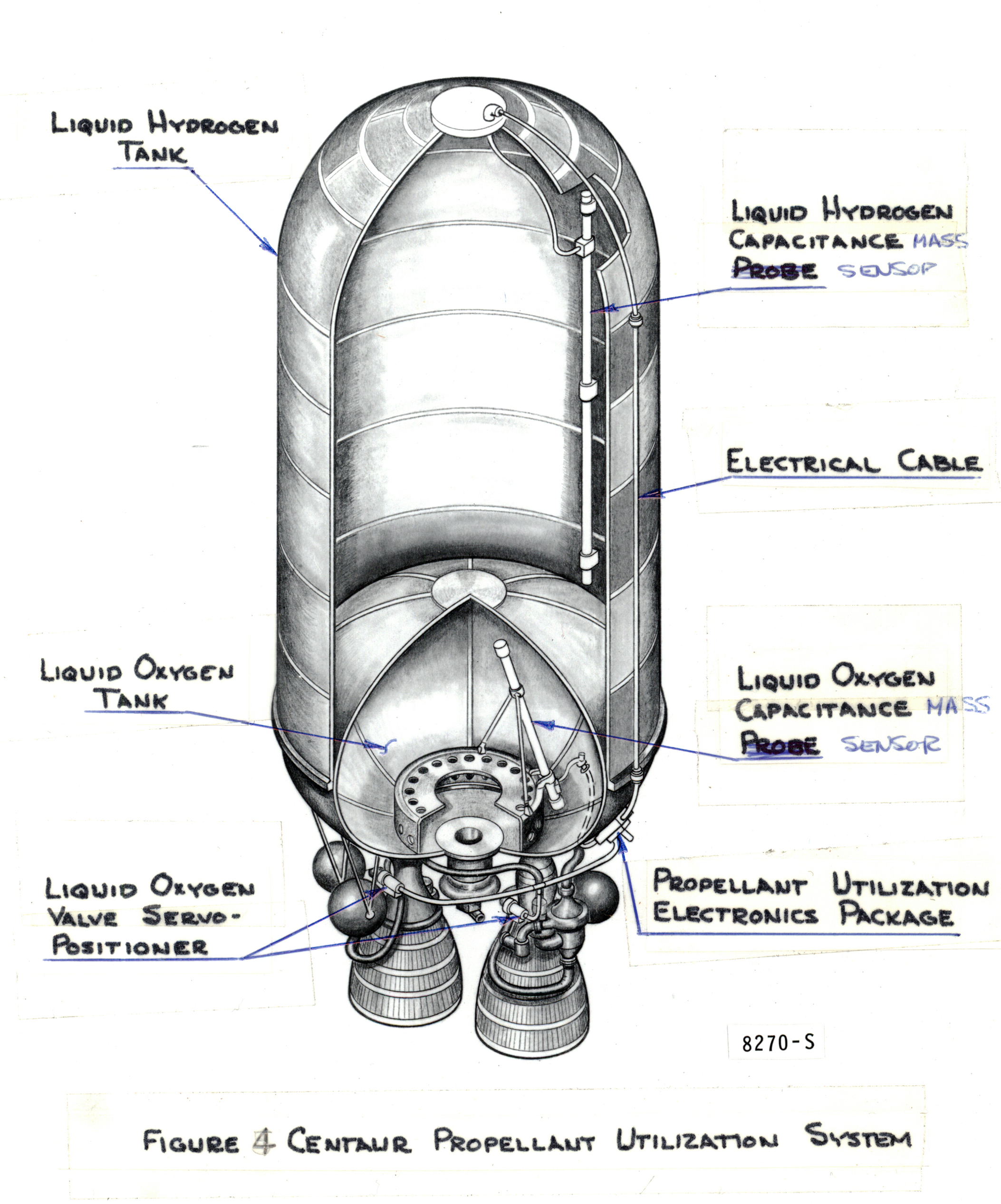
Diagram of the Centaur balloon tank

A balloon tank is a style of propellant tank used in the SM-65 Atlas intercontinental ballistic missile (ICBM) and Centaur upper stage that does not use an internal framework, but instead relies on a positive internal pressurization to keep its shape.

Balloon tanks are very light, and this permits a good propellant mass fraction. A disadvantage of balloon tanks is that if pressurization fails, the vessel collapses.

== Design ==
Balloon tanks get their name from the cylindrical party balloons that inspired Karel Bossart, who designed both the Atlas and Centaur rockets for the U.S. Air Force and NASA. Constructed of very thin 301 extra-full-hard stainless steel 0.014–0.037 inch (0.3556–0.9398 mm) thick, prior to integration into the Atlas or Centaur rocket body the tanks are inflated with nitrogen to give them their shape and strength. As such, balloon tanks must always remain pressurized, as any appreciable drop in pressurization will result in failure. However, the airframes could be handled without tank pressurization through the use of a "stretch" mechanism (which basically helped support vehicle weight and prevented collapse). By contrast, non-balloon tanks in other liquid-propelled rockets remain rigid while empty due to an internal framework, although they do also depend on internal pressurization to support thrust and launch loads.

== History ==
The use of balloon tanks in the Atlas ICBM was the brainchild of rocket designer Karel Bossart. Instead of the traditional internal framework used on the rockets available at that time, especially the Redstone short-range ballistic missile (SRBM), a direct descendant of the V-2 rocket, the Atlas ICBM designers used the balloon tank concept to lighten the rocket enough to hurl up to a 3.75 megaton thermonuclear warhead at a target in the Soviet Union from a launch pad in the contiguous United States. This tank technology made feasible a relatively simple stage-and-a-half design for Atlas instead of the more complicated staging used in later LGM-25 Titan ICBMs.

After its initial development in the Atlas rocket, Bossart used the same technology with the high-energy Centaur upper stage. The Centaur rocket, fueled with liquid hydrogen and powered by an RL10 engine, was originally planned to be used with the Saturn V rocket for high-energy missions to the Solar System, but was later adapted for use as part of the Atlas and Titan rockets.

In May 1963 at Vandenberg Air Force Base an Atlas–Agena vehicle under static testing suffered a pressurization failure, leading to the total collapse of the vehicle that was scheduled to carry a KH-7 spy satellite. The Agena upper stage was repaired and used for later flight. A 2009 article mentions a review of hardware serial numbers which lead to the conclusion that the satellite payload had not yet been mounted on the rocket during the failed test. A history of the program, however, written in 1973 (declassified in 2011) states that the satellite was damaged beyond repair.

With the introduction of the Atlas V Evolved Expendable Launch Vehicle (EELV), balloon tanks and half-staging are no longer used on the Atlas rocket. Centaur, however, retains this feature, yet it has not undergone a single catastrophic failure since the Atlas first flight.
