= 566th Strategic Missile Squadron =

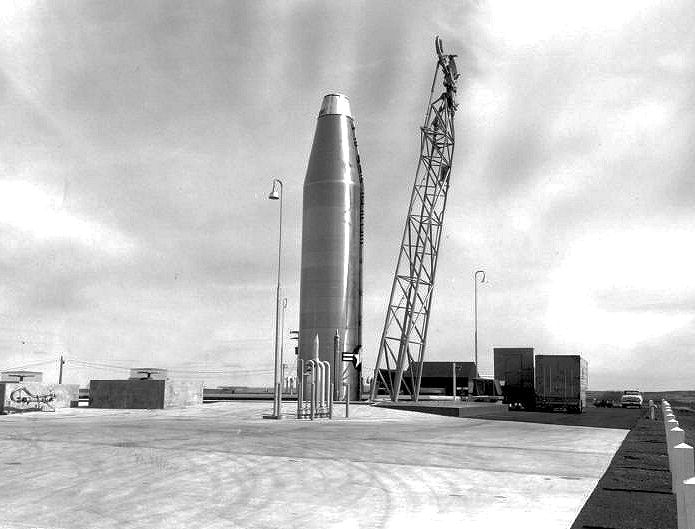
- Squadron SM-65E Atlas missile in fully raised position at launch site
- Active: 1943–1945; 1947–1949; 1959–1965
- Country: United States
- Branch: United States Air Force
- Type: Squadron
- Role: Intercontinental ballistic missile
- Engagements: European Theater of Operations
- Decorations: Distinguished Unit Citation

Insignia
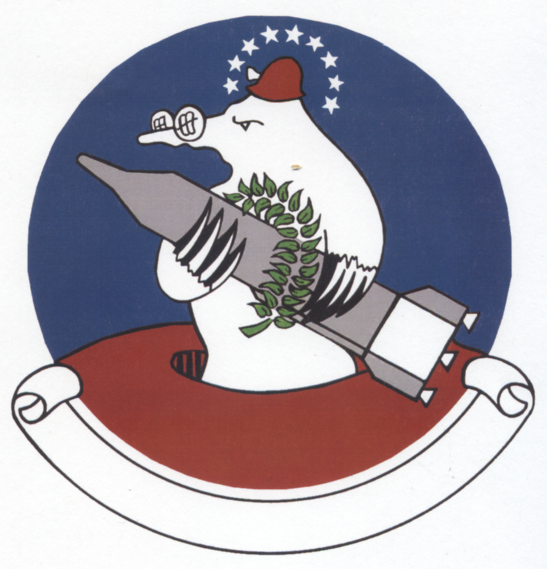
- 566th Strategic Missile Squadron emblem (Note: Approved 2 March 1962. Description: On an Air Force blue disc, a mound of terra-cotta colored earth; emerging from a hole in the mound, a caricatured mole wearing glasses on the end of his long snout, all white, and a miner's cap terra cotta, and supporting in his arms a silver-gray missile, trimmed in white and entwined with a green olive branch; above the mole's head a halo of nine white stars; outlines and details black throughout. Patches exist that indicate that prior to the approval of this emblem, the squadron used the emblem approved for the squadron it replaced at Warren in July 1961, the 549th Strategic Missile Squadron, with the squadron's number substituted for the 549th's.)

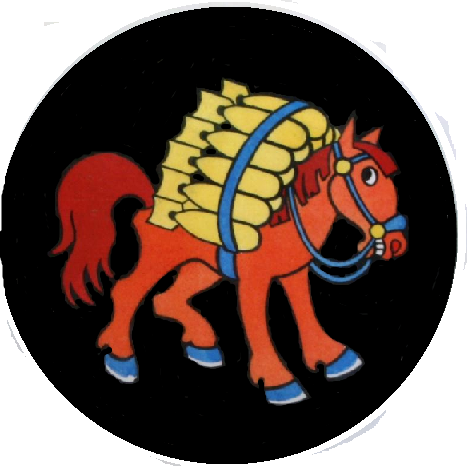
- 566th Bombardment Squadron emblem
- World War II fuselage marking: RR

The 566th Strategic Missile Squadron is an inactive United States Air Force unit. It was last assigned to the 389th Strategic Missile Wing at Francis E. Warren Air Force Base, Wyoming, where it was inactivated on 25 March 1965. The squadron was equipped with SM-65 Atlases.

The squadron was first activated during World War II as the 566th Bombardment Squadron. After training in the United States, it deployed to England, and participated in the strategic bombing campaign against Germany. Shortly after its arrival in Europe, the squadron sent a detachment to Libya. From this location, the detachment participated in Operation Tidal Wave, the low level attack on oil refineries near Ploesti, for which it was awarded a Distinguished Unit Citation. Following V-E Day, the squadron returned to the United States and was inactivated in September 1945. The squadron was active from 1947 to 1949 in the reserve, but does not appear to have been fully equipped or manned.

It was activated as a strategic missile unit at Offutt Air Force Base, Nebraska in 1959, but moved to Warren in 1961 as it was becoming operational.

== History ==
=== World War II ===
==== Initial activation and training ====
The squadron was first activated as the 566th Bombardment Squadron in late December 1942 at Davis-Monthan Field, Arizona, one of the original four squadrons of the 389th Bombardment Group. A little over a month later, its cadre moved to Biggs Field, Texas, where it began training with the Consolidated B-24 Liberator heavy bomber. The squadron departed the United States for the European Theater of Operations in June 1943. The ground echelon proceeded to the New York Port of Embarkation and Camp Kilmer, New Jersey, sailing on the RMS Queen Elizabeth, reaching the United Kingdom on 6 July. The air echelon began ferrying their Liberators to Europe on 13 June after staging at Sioux City Army Air Base, then following the North Atlantic ferry route.

==== Combat in Europe ====
By the time the ground echelon arrived at the squadron's combat station, RAF Hethel, the squadron had been called upon to reinforce Ninth Air Force in Africa and had begun its movement to Libya. The advanced echelon of the 389th Group had arrived at Hethel on 11 June and most of the air echelon was in place two weeks later. Personnel were transferred from the 44th and 93d Bombardment Groups to provide the squadron ground support in Libya.

The squadron flew its first combat mission on 9 July 1943, with an attack on Maleme, Crete. It also flew missions to Sicily and other parts of Italy to support Operation Husky, the invasion of Sicily through the middle of July. During the later part of the month the squadron concentrated on training for low-level operations in preparation for the attack on the oil refineries around Ploesti, Romania. Operation Tidal Wave was launched on 1 August 1943, with the squadron forming part of the last group formation to attack. The squadron headed for its target in Campina. This target was the most distant of the refineries being attacked and was assigned to the 389th Group because its B-24Ds were late production models and had a longer range than the planes of the other attacking groups. This refinery was totally destroyed in the attack. The squadron was awarded a Distinguished Unit Citation for this action. Before returning to England, the squadron participated in another long range attack on the Messerschmitt aircraft factory at Wiener Neustadt, Austria on 13 August, which reduced the production of Bf 109s at the factory by a third. The squadron returned to England in the last week of August.

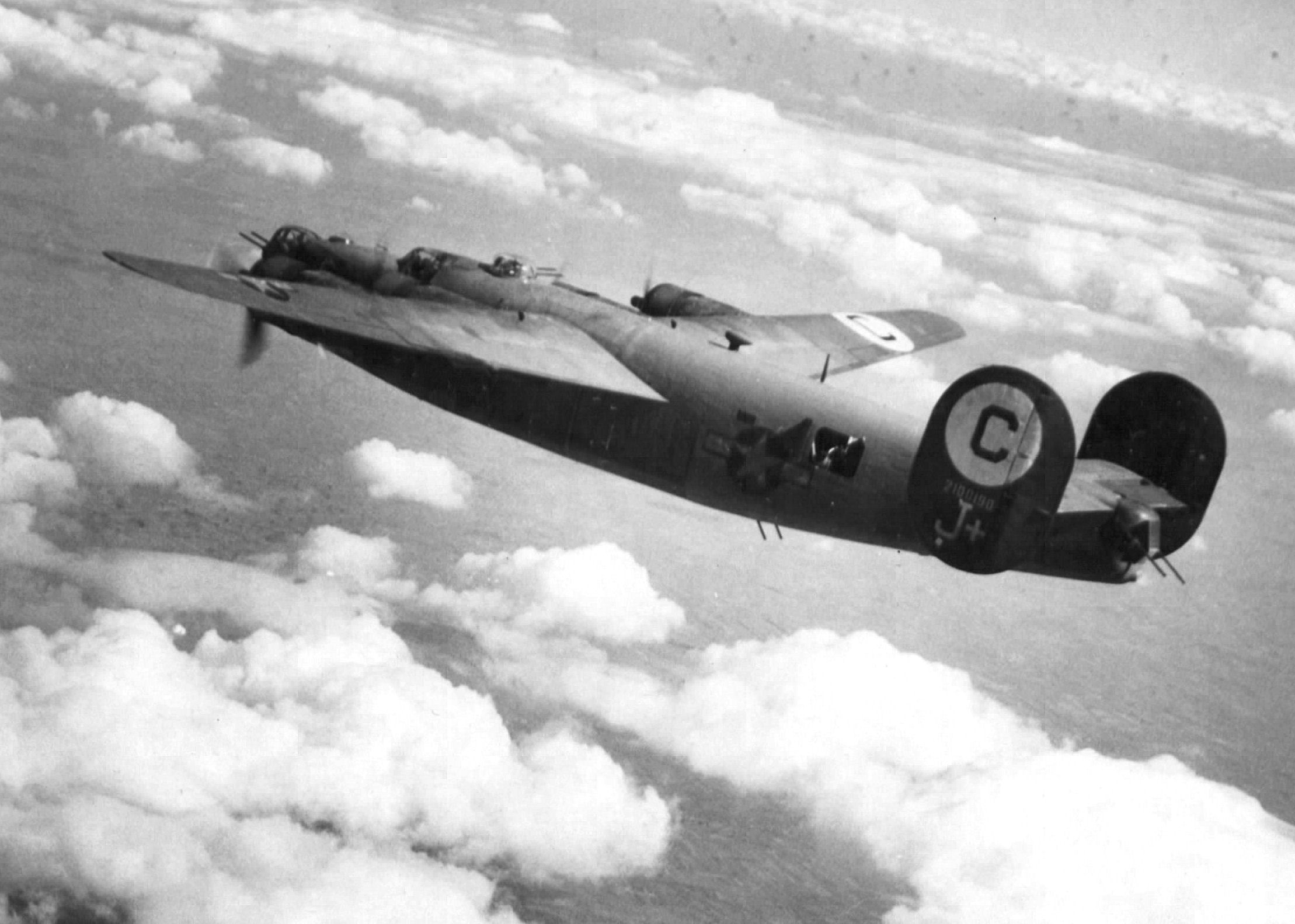
Squadron B-24J Liberator (Note: Aircraft is Consolidated B-24J-80-CO Liberator, serial 42-100190 Princess Konocti, fuselage code RR-J+. This plane diverted to Sweden on 20 June 1944 and was interned. It was returned by Sweden on 15 June 1945. Baugher, Joe (7 March 2023). "1942 USAF Serial Numbers". Joe Baugher.)

The 566th flew its first combat mission from England on 7 September 1943, when it attacked an air base in the Netherlands. The squadron again deployed to Tunisia during September and October 1943 to support Operation Avalanche, the landings on the Italian mainland at Salerno, striking targets in Corsica, Italy, and Austria. After returning to England, the squadron concentrated on strategic bombing campaign against Germany, with targets including industrial areas of Berlin, oil production plants at Merseburg, and factories at Munster, and shipbuilding facilities at Vegesack. It struck V-1 flying bomb and V-2 rocket launch sites in the Pas de Calais and participated in the strikes against the German aircraft manufacturing industry during Big Week in late February 1944.

The squadron was occasionally diverted from strategic targets to perform air support and interdiction missions. To support Operation Overlord, the invasion of Normandy, it hit airfields and artillery batteries. It struck enemy positions to support Operation Cobra, the breakout at Saint Lo. During the Battle of the Bulge, from December 1944 to January 1945, it attacked storage depots and communications centers. It supported Operation Varsity, the airborne assault across the Rhine by dropping food, ammunition, and other supplies to the ground troops. The squadron flew its last mission on 25 April 1945.

==== Return to the United States and inactivation ====
Following V-E Day, the squadron returned to the United States. The first airplane left Hethel on 20 May 1945 and the ground echelon left England on the SS Cristobal on 30 May. The squadron reformed at Charleston Army Air Field, South Carolina in June for air transport missions, but was not fully manned before inactivating on 13 September 1945.

=== Air reserve ===
The squadron was activated in the reserve at Rapid City Army Air Field, South Dakota, where it trained under the supervision of Air Defense Command (ADC). It is not clear to what degree the squadron was staffed or equipped. In 1948 Continental Air Command (ConAC) assumed responsibility for managing reserve and Air National Guard units from ADC. President Truman’s reduced 1949 defense budget required reductions in the number of units in the Air Force, The 566th was inactivated in June 1949 as reserve flying operations at what was now Ellsworth Air Force Base came to an end.

=== Intercontinental ballistic missile squadron ===
==== Offutt Air Force Base ====
The squadron was redesignated the 566th Strategic Missile Squadron and activated in August 1959 at Offutt Air Force Base, Nebraska, where it was assigned to the 4321st Strategic Wing. The squadron was the last SM-65D Atlas squadron to be activated under Strategic Air Command (SAC). On 30 March 1961, the squadron was declared operational, the last Atlas D unit to do so, completing the deployment of the D model of this intercontinental ballistic missile.

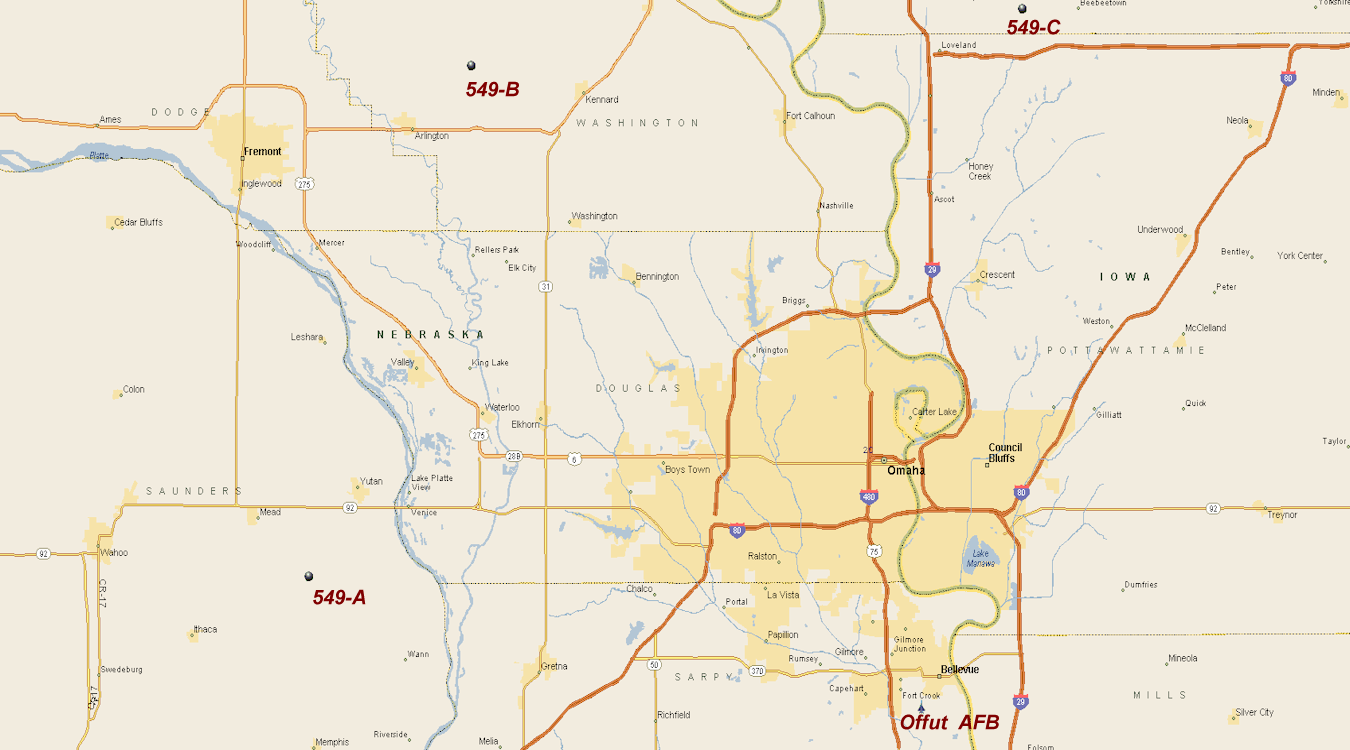
Offutt SM-65D Atlas Missile Sites

The squadron operated three missile sites of three SM-65D missiles at each site (9 total) at Offutt:

566-A, 3.4 mi SE of Mead, NE 41°11′37″N 096°26′23″W
566-B, 3.6 mi NE of Arlington, NE 41°29′17″N 096°17′59″W
566-C, 4.3 mi SE of Missouri Valley, IA 41°31′15″N 095°49′09″W

==== Francis E. Warren Air Force Base ====
On 1 July 1961, the 706th Strategic Missile Wing at Francis E. Warren Air Force Base, Wyoming was inactivated and replaced by the 389th Strategic Missile Wing. In connection with this reorganization, the squadron (which was one of the 389th's traditional squadrons) transferred its mission, personnel and equipment to the 549th Strategic Missile Squadron, which moved to Offutt in its place. The squadron was not inactivated, but instead replaced the 549th Squadron at Francis E. Warren and took over the 549th's SM-65E Atlas missiles there.

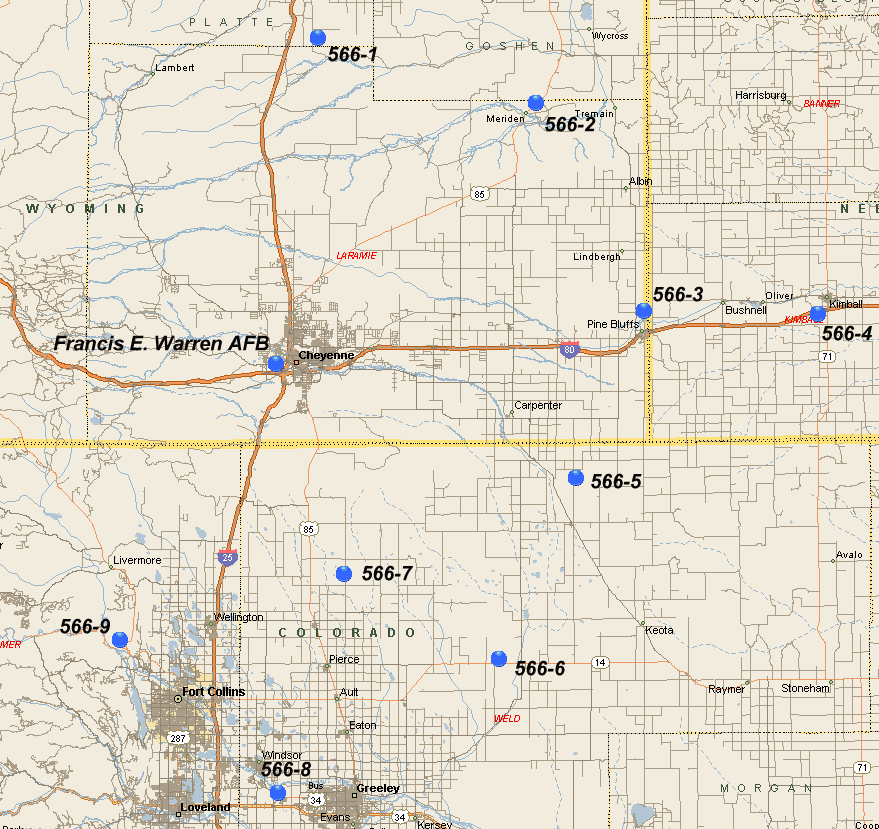
Warren SM-65E Atlas Missile Sites

The Atlas E had an all-inertial system that obviated the need for ground control facilities. Since the missiles were no longer tied to a central guidance control facility, the launchers could be dispersed widely. At Warren, the squadron operated the following missile sites, with one missile at each site (9 total):

566–1, 6.5 mi SSE of Chugwater, WY 41°40′07″N 104°46′37″W
566–2, 8.8 mi SW of LaGrange, WY 41°33′39″N 104°17′56″W
566–3, 2.5 mi N of Pine Bluffs, WY 41°13′05″N 104°03′56″W
566–4, 2.2 mi SW of Kimball, NE 41°12′36″N 103°41′09″W
566–5, 5.1 mi N of Grover, CO 40°56′44″N 104°12′57″W
566–6, 3.2 mi WNW of Briggsdale, CO 40°38′56″N 104°23′04″W
566–7, 6.7 mi NNE of Nunn, CO 40°47′17″N 104°43′10″W
566–8, 1.9 mi W of Greeley, CO 40°25′46″N 104°51′42″W
566–9, 8.8 mi NW of Fort Collins, CO 40°40′43″N 105°12′13″W

In response to the Cuban Missile Crisis, on 20 October 1962, SAC directed that all Atlas E missiles off alert for modifications be “as covertly as possible” returned to alert status. Atlas missiles being used for operational readiness training were to be put on alert as soon as liquid oxygen was available. For safety reasons, liquid nitrogen was used rather than liquid oxygen during training. Despite the need for stealth, eventually a priority was established that resulted in the entire production of liquid oxygen in the US being diverted to SAC to bring the missiles to readiness. From 3 November the number of alert missiles was reduced until on 29 November the number was the same as before the crisis. Normal training had resumed on 15 November.

On 19 November 1964, the Department of Defense announced that all Atlas E and F missiles would be removed from the inventory. (Note: Headquarters USAF had approved the phaseout of Atlas and Titan I missiles in May 1963. SAC Missile Chronology, p. 40.) The squadron's first missiles were taken off alert on 4 January 1965. With the retirement of the Atlas E, the squadron became non operational in February 1965, and was inactivated on 25 March 1965.

== Lineage ==
- Constituted as the 566th Bombardment Squadron (Heavy) on 19 December 1942

Activated on 24 December 1942
Redesignated 566th Bombardment Squadron, Heavy on 4 January 1944
Inactivated on 13 September 1945

- Redesignated 566th Bombardment Squadron, Very Heavy on 25 August 1947

Activated in the reserve on 15 September 1947
Inactivated on 27 June 1949

- Redesignated 566th Strategic Missile Squadron (ICBM-Atlas) on 22 April 1959

Activated on 15 August 1959
Inactivated on 25 March 1965

=== Assignments ===
- 389th Bombardment Group, 24 December 1942 – 13 September 1945
- Second Air Force, 15 September 1947
- Tenth Air Force, 1 July 1948 – 27 June 1949
- Second Air Force, 15 August 1959
- 4321st Strategic Wing, 1 October 1959
- 389th Strategic Missile Wing, 1 July 1961 – 25 March 1965

=== Stations ===
- Davis-Monthan Field, Arizona, 24 December 1942
- Biggs Field, Texas, 1 February 1943
- Lowry Field, Colorado, 19 April–1 June 1943
- RAF Hethel (AAF-114), England, 16 Jun 1943-c. 28 May 1945 (operated from Soluch Airfield, Libya, 3 July–25 August 1943; Massicault Airfield, Tunisia, 19 September–3 October 1943
- Charleston Army Air Field, South Carolina, 12 June—13 September 1945
- Rapid City Army Air Field (later Rapid City Airfield, Weaver Air Force Base, Rapid City Air Force Base), South Dakota, 15 September 1947 – 27 June 1949
- Offutt Air Force Base, Nebraska, 15 August 1959
- Francis E. Warren Air Force Base, Wyoming, 1 July 1961 – 25 March 1965

=== Aircraft and missiles ===
- B-24 Liberator, 1942–1945
- SM-65E (later CGM-16E) Atlas Missile, 1960-1961
- SM-65D (later CGM-16D) Atlas Missile, 1961–1965

=== Awards and campaigns ===
Award streamer	Award	Dates	Notes
	Distinguished Unit Citation	1 August 1943	Ploesti, Romania 566th Bombardment Squadron

Campaign Streamer	Campaign	Dates	Notes
	Air Offensive, Europe	16 June 1943 – 5 June 1944	566th Bombardment Squadron
	Air Combat, EAME Theater	16 June 1943 – 11 May 1945	566th Bombardment Squadron
	Sicily	3 July 1943 – 17 August 1943	566th Bombardment Squadron
	Naples-Foggia	18 August 1943 – 3 October 1943	566th Bombardment Squadron
	Normandy	6 June 1944 – 24 July 1944	566th Bombardment Squadron
	Northern France	25 July 1944 – 14 September 1944	566th Bombardment Squadron
	Rhineland	15 September 1944 – 21 March 1945	566th Bombardment Squadron
	Ardennes-Alsace	16 December 1944 – 25 January 1945	566th Bombardment Squadron
	Central Europe	22 March 1944 – 21 May 1945	566th Bombardment Squadron

== See also ==
- List of United States Air Force missile squadrons
- B-24 Liberator units of the United States Army Air Forces
