= 549th Strategic Missile Squadron =

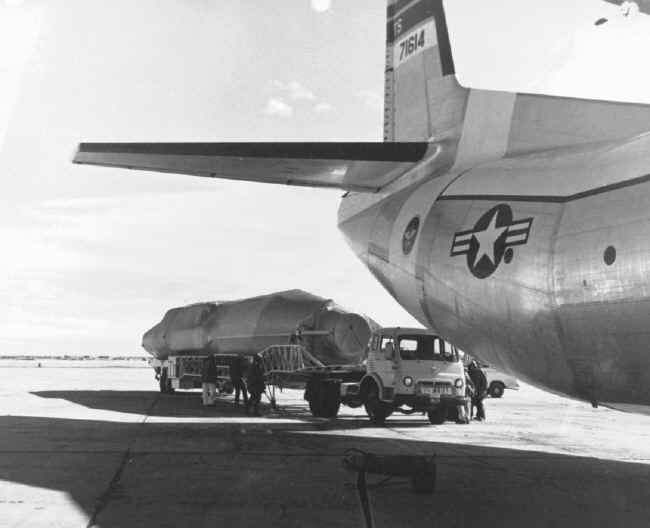
- Squadron SM-65D Atlas missile arriving at Offutt AFB in 1961 on a C-133 Cargomaster (Note: Aircraft is Douglas C-133A-35-DL Cargomaster, serial 57-1614. Had clamshell doors and later designated C-133B. Baugher, Joe (21 April 2023). "1957 USAF Serial Numbers". Joe Baugher.)
- Active: 1942–1945; 197–1949; 1961–1964
- Country: United States
- Branch: United States Air Force
- Role: Intercontinental ballistic missile
- Motto: Guardian of Peace (1962-1964)
- Engagements: European Theater of Operations
- Decorations: Distinguished Unit Citation

Insignia
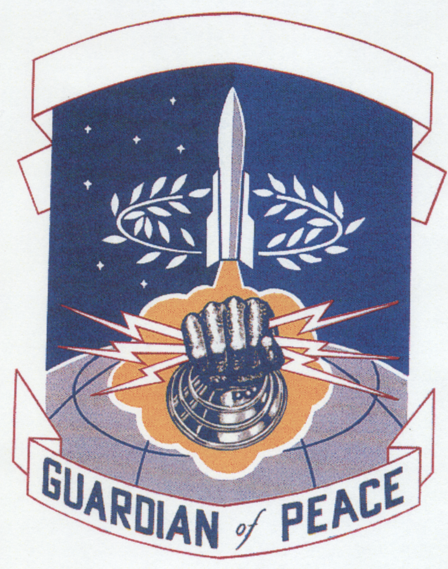
- 549th Strategic Missile Squadron emblem (Note: Approved 2 March 1962. Description: On a rectangular area arched in chief and base per pale dark blue spattered with stars and Air Force blue, the top of a silver-gray globe issuing from base, grid lines dark blue; all surmounted by a white missile palewise pointing upward shaded silver-gray, emitting an Air Force golden yellow blast-off vapor to base, edged white, surmounting the vapor cloud an armored hand, dark blue, highlighted white and shaded silver-gray, grasping three white lightning streaks edged red; encirdling the missile a white stylized olive wreath.)

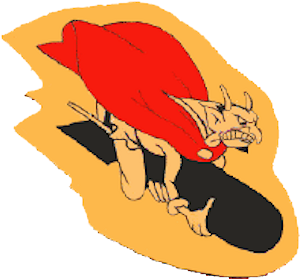
- 549th Bombardment Squadron emblem
- World War II fuselage code (Note: The code letters were apparently not widely used by the squadron until 1945. Watkins, pp. 70-71; Freeman, p. 288.): XA

The 549th Strategic Missile Squadron is an inactive United States Air Force unit. It was last assigned to the 385th Strategic Aerospace Wing at Offutt Air Force Base, Nebraska, where it was inactivated on 15 December 1964. At Offutt, the 549th was equipped with the SM-65E Atlas intercontinental ballistic missile, with a mission of nuclear deterrence.

The squadron was first activated during World War II in December 1942 as the 549th Bombardment Squadron. After training in the United States, it deployed to England, where it participated in the strategic bombing campaign against Germany. The squadron was twice awarded the Distinguished Unit Citation for its actions during the war. Following V-E Day, the squadron returned to the United States, where it was inactivated. The squadron was activated in the reserve from 1947 to 1949, but does not appear to have been fully manned or equipped.

== History ==
=== World War II ===
==== Initial activation and training ====
The squadron was first activated at Davis-Monthan Field, Arizona as the 549th Bombardment Squadron, one of the four original squadrons of the 385th Bombardment Group. The following month it moved to El Paso Army Air Field, Texas, but did not receive a full complement of personnel and begin training with Boeing B-17 Flying Fortress until it moved to Geiger Field, Washington in February 1943. It completed its training and began deploying to the European Theater of Operations. The air echelon staged through Kearney Army Air Field, Nebraska in May 1943 and ferried its Flying Fortresses to England via the northern ferry route. The ground echelon left for the port of embarkation and sailed on the RMS Queen Elizabeth on 1 July 1943.

==== Combat in Europe ====
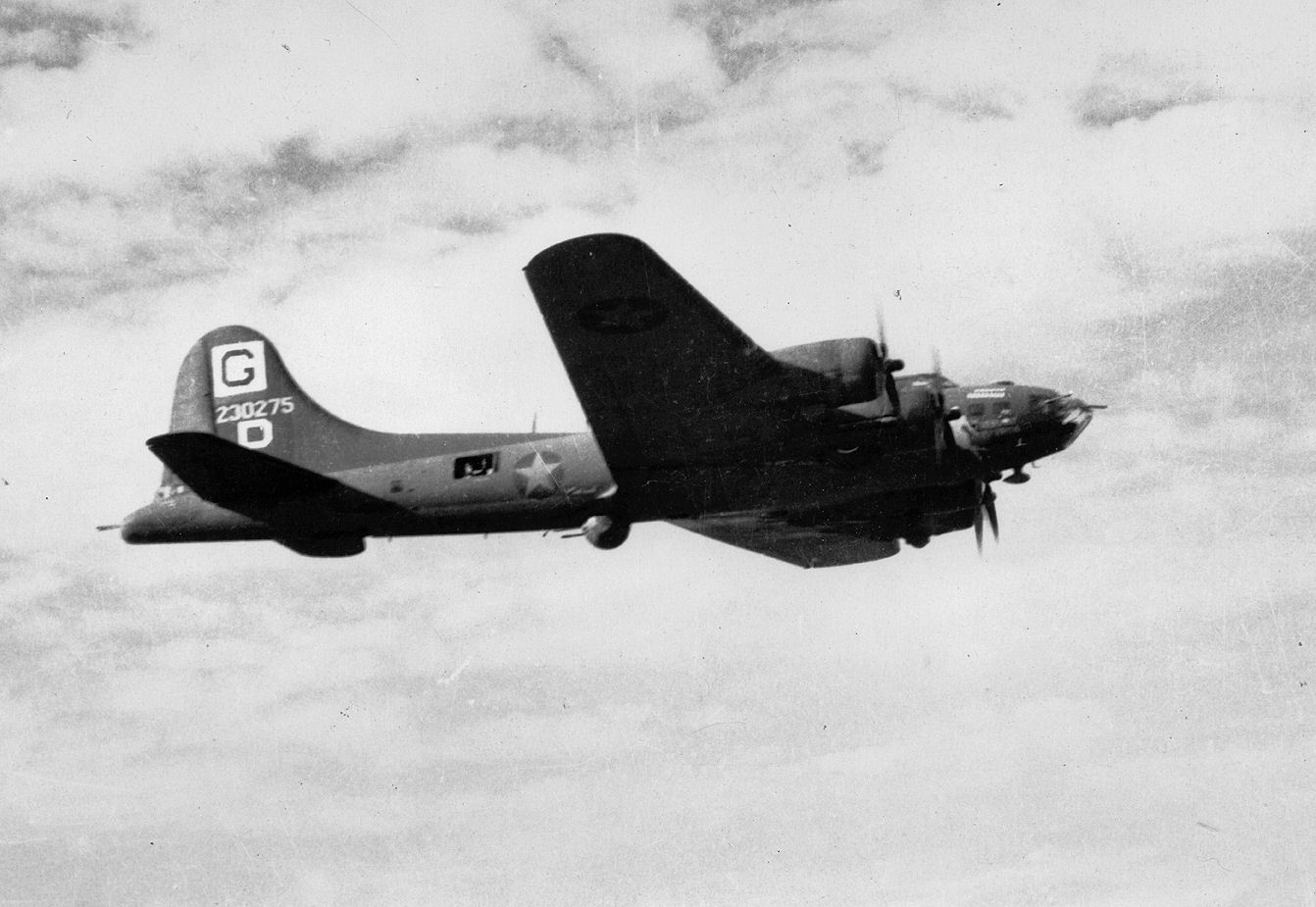
385th Bombardment Group B-17 (Note: Aircraft is Boeing B-17F-95-BO Flying Fortress, serial 42-30275, The Vibrant Virgin, GX-P. It was shot down on a mission to Bremen, Germany on 8 October 1943. Baugher, Joe (10 April 2023). "1942 USAF Serial Numbers". Joe Baugher. Missing Air Crew Report 825.)

The squadron assembled at its combat station, RAF Great Ashfield, England, and began participating in the strategic bombing campaign against Germany, flying its first combat mission on 17 July 1943. The unit carried out attacks on industrial targets, including communications centers as well as air bases in Belgium, France, Germany, the Netherlands, Belgium and Norway, striking targets as far away as Poland. On 17 August 1943, the squadron participated in an attack on the Messerschmitt aircraft factory at Regensburg, which involved a long flight over heavily defended enemy territory with little protection from escorting fighters. (Note: Half the fighter escorts missed the scheduled rendezvous, the other half returned to England at the limit of their fuel supplies before the heaviest interceptor attacks began. Freeman, p. 68.) For this mission, the squadron received the Distinguished Unit Citation. On 12 May 1944, the squadron flew with the 385th Group as it led the 4th Combat Bombardment Wing through heavy opposition to attack an airplane repair facility at Zwickau. An estimated 200 enemy fighters attacked the bomber stream, heavily disordering its formation. The bombers were able to reform and achieved a high degree of accuracy with their bombs. For this attack, the 549th received a second DUC.

Strategic industrial targets for the squadron in Germany included the AGO Flugzeugwerke factory at Oschersleben and the Henschel Flugzeugwerke factory at Marienberg; a battery manufacturing plant at Stuttgart, oil refineries at Ludwigshafen and Merseburg and rail marshalling yards at Munich and Oranienburg. It also attacked Luftwaffe bases at Beauvais/Tille Airfield and Chartres Airfield, France.

The squadron was occasionally diverted from the strategic bombing mission to perform air support and interdiction missions. It struck coastal defenses in June 1944 in preparation for Operation Overlord, the Normandy invasion, and on D-Day attacked transportation chokepoints and marshalling yards. In late July, it attacked enemy positions to support Operation Cobra, the breakout at Saint Lo. In late December 1944 and early January 1945, it carried out attacks on German fortifications and transportation to support forces engaged in the Battle of the Bulge. As the Allies made their final thrust through France into Germany, it attacked troop concentrations and communications targets.

The squadron flew its last mission on 20 April 1945. Following V-E Day, the squadron transported prisoners of war from Germany and flew six missions dropping food supplies in the Netherlands. (Note: One of the food missions counted as a combat mission when the unit was fired on. Freeman, p. 254.) The air echelon began ferrying its aircraft back to the United States on 19 June and all bombers had departed Great Ashfield by the end of the month. The ground echelon of the squadron left Europe in August 1945, sailing on the RMS Queen Elizabeth and the squadron was inactivated in the United States at Sioux Falls Army Air Field, South Dakota on 28 August 1945.

=== Air Force reserve ===
On 15 September 1947, the squadron was activated under Air Defense Command (ADC) in the reserve at Selfridge Field, Michigan. ADC's 136th AAF Base Unit (later the 2242d Air Force Reserve Training Center) supervised the unit's training. In July 1948 Continental Air Command (ConAC) assumed responsibility for managing reserve and Air National Guard units from ADC. The squadron does not appear to have been fully manned or equipped during this period. The 549th was inactivated when ConAC reorganized its reserve units under the wing base organization system in June 1949. President Truman's reduced 1949 defense budget also required reductions in the number of units in the Air Force, The squadron's personnel and equipment were transferred to elements of the 439th Troop Carrier Wing.

=== Intercontinental ballistic missile squadron ===
The squadron was organized at Francis E. Warren Air Force Base Wyoming on 1 October 1960 and assigned to the 706th Strategic Missile Wing. The squadron was equipped with SM-65E Atlas intercontinental ballistic missiles. The squadron was the last Atlas E squadron to be activated. On 1 July 1961, the 706th Wing was inactivated and replaced by the 389th Strategic Missile Wing. In connection with this reorganization, the squadron transferred its mission, personnel and equipment to the 566th Strategic Missile Squadron, which moved to F. E. Warren in its place.

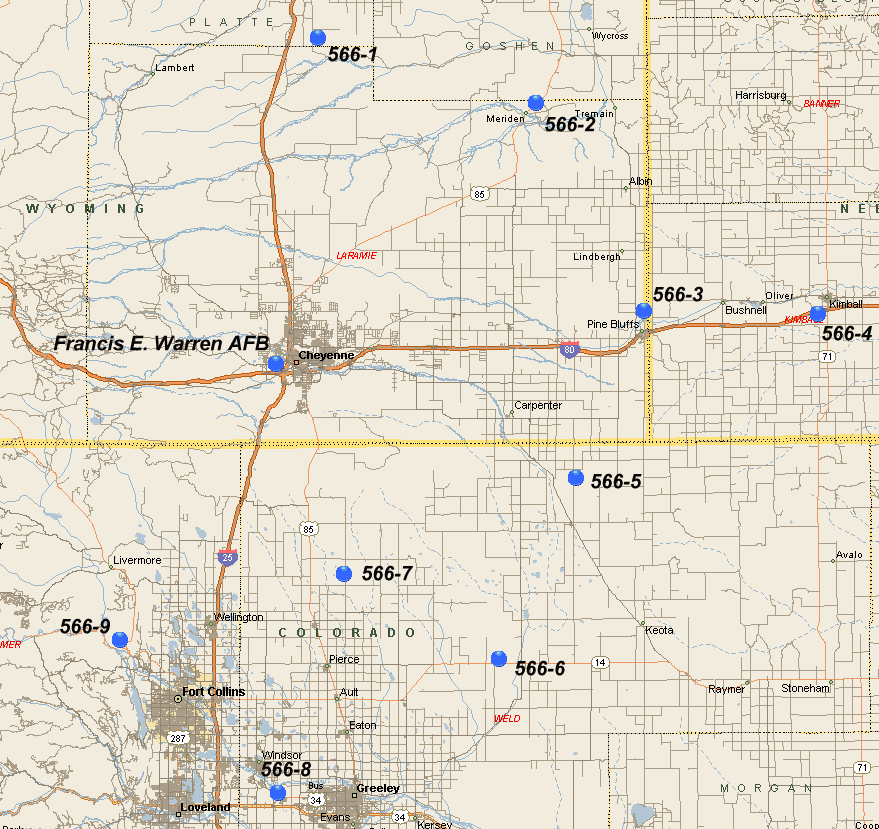
Warren SM-65E Atlas Missile Sites

The squadron operated nine missile sites, one SM-65E missile at each site at Francis E. Warren:

549–1, 6.5 mi SSE of Chugwater, WY 41°40′07″N 104°46′37″W
549–2, 8.8 mi SW of LaGrange, WY 41°33′39″N 104°17′56″W
549–3, 2.5 mi N of Pine Bluffs, WY 41°13′05″N 104°03′56″W
549–4, 2.2 mi SW of Kimball, NE 41°12′36″N 103°41′09″W
549–5, 5.1 mi N of Grover, CO 40°56′44″N 104°12′57″W
549–6, 3.2 mi WNW of Briggsdale, CO 40°38′56″N 104°23′04″W
549–7, 6.7 mi NNE of Nunn, CO 40°47′17″N 104°43′10″W
549–8, 1.9 mi W of Greeley, CO 40°25′46″N 104°51′42″W
549–9, 8.8 mi NW of Fort Collins, CO 40°40′43″N 105°12′13″W

The squadron was not inactivated, but replaced the 566th Squadron at Offutt Air Force Base, Nebraska, where it was assigned to the 4321st Strategic Wing and took over the 566th's SM-65D Atlas missiles. The last Atlas D had been declared operational at Offutt in March, and the Offutt squadron had gone on alert.

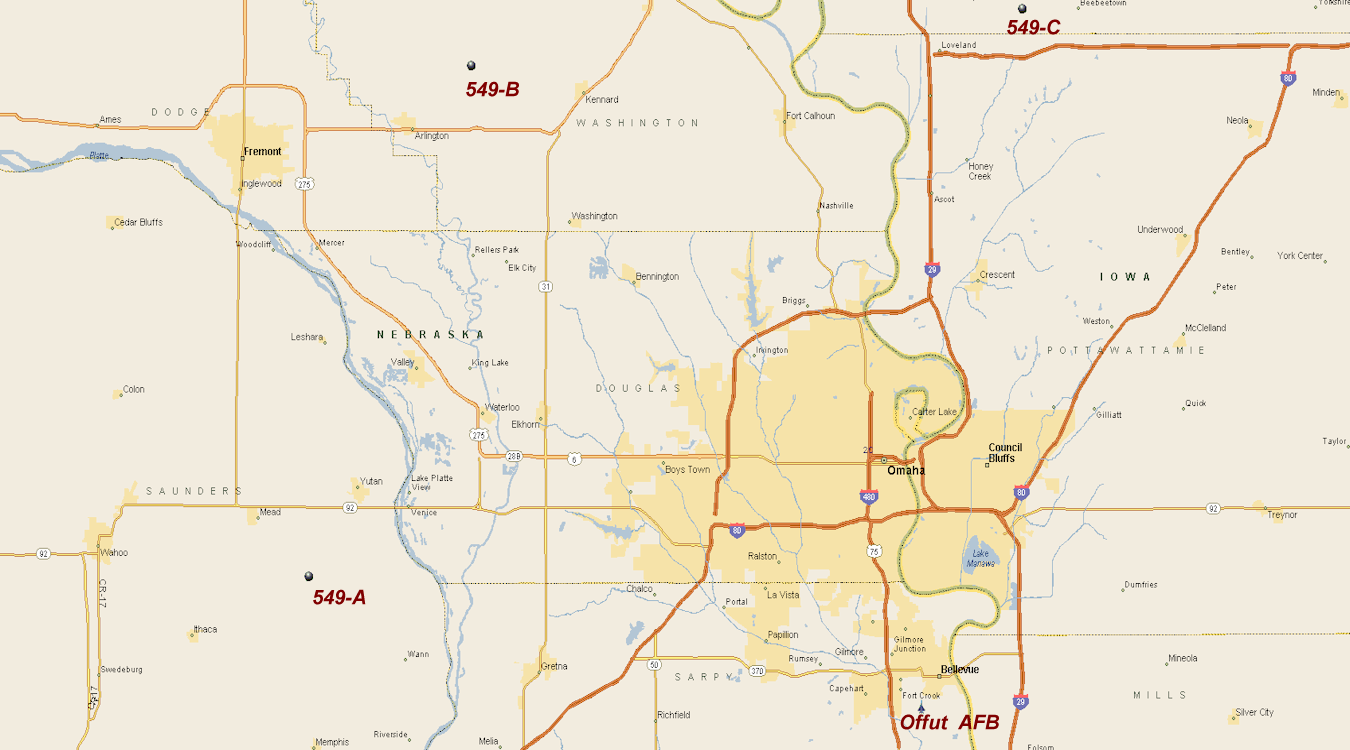
Offutt SM-65D Atlas Missile Sites

The squadron operated three missile sites of three SM-65D missiles at each site (9 total) at Offutt:

549-A, 3.4 mi SE of Mead, NE 41°11′37″N 096°26′23″W
549-B, 3.6 mi NE of Arlington, NE 41°29′17″N 096°17′59″W
549-C, 4.3 mi SE of Missouri Valley, IA 41°31′15″N 095°49′09″W

During the Cuban Missile Crisis, on 20 October 1962, SAC directed that the squadron's missiles that were not on alert for modifications be placed on alert status "as covertly as possible." Training was suspended and missiles being used for operational training were to be placed on alert as soon as liquid oxygen became available. (Note: For safety reasons, training missiles used liquid nitrogen, rather than liquid oxygen in their propellant tanks. Kipp, et al., pp. 62-63) From 3 November the number of alert missiles was reduced until on 29 November the number was the same as before the crisis. As tensions eased, on 15 November normal training resumed.

In May 1963, a committee formed to review USAF's missile program recommended that Atlas E missiles be phased out of the inventory between 1965 and 1968. The squadron was the last to maintain the D model on alert, but its last alert missile stood down on 1 October 1964. On 22 October, the last of the squadrons missiles were shipped for storage for future use as launch vehicles for research and development programs. The squadron was inactivated on 15 December 1964.

== Lineage ==
- Constituted as the 549th Bombardment Squadron (Heavy) on 25 November 1942

Activated on 1 December 1942
Redesignated 549th Bombardment Squadron, Heavy on 20 August 1943
Inactivated on 28 August 1945

- Redesignated 549th Bombardment Squadron, Very Heavy on 25 August 1947

Activated in the reserve on 15 September 1947
Inactivated on 27 June 1949

- Redesignated 549th Strategic Missile Squadron (ICBM-Atlas) and activated on 19 April 1960 (not organized)

Organized on 1 October 1960
Inactivated on 15 December 1964

=== Assignments ===
- 385th Bombardment Group, 1 December 1942 – 28 August 1945
- Second Air Force, 15 September 1947
- Tenth Air Force, 1 July 1948
- First Air Force, 15 August 1948
- Tenth Air Force, 1 December 1948 – 27 June 1949
- Strategic Air Command, 19 April 1960 (not organized)
- 706th Strategic Missile Wing, 1 October 1960
- 4321st Strategic Wing, 1 July 1961
- 385th Strategic Aerospace Wing, 1 January 1963 – 15 December 1964

=== Stations ===
- Davis-Monthan Field, Arizona, 1 December 1942
- El Paso Army Air Field, Texas, 4 January 1943
- Geiger Field, Washington. 1 February 1943
- Great Falls Army Air Base, Montana, 11 March – 7 June 1943
- RAF Great Ashfield (AAF-155), England, 29 June 1943 – 6 August 1945
- Sioux Falls Army Air Field, South Dakota, 14–28 August 1945
- Selfridge Field (later Selfridge Air Force Base), Michigan, 15 September 1947 – 27 June 1949
- Francis E. Warren Air Force Base, Wyoming, 1 October 1960
- Offutt Air Force Base, Nebraska, 1 July 1961 – 25 March 1965

=== Aircraft and missiles ===
- B-17 Flying Fortress, 1942–1945
- SM-65 Atlas Missile, 1961, 1961-1964

=== Awards and campaigns ===
Award streamer	Award	Dates	Notes
	Distinguished Unit Citation	17 August 1943	Germany, 549th Bombardment Squadron
	Distinguished Unit Citation	12 May 1944	Zwickau, Germany 549th Bombardment Squadron

Campaign Streamer	Campaign	Dates	Notes
	Air Offensive, Europe	29 June 1943 – 5 June 1944	549th Bombardment Squadron
	Air Combat, EAME Theater	29 June 1943 – 11 May 1945	549th Bombardment Squadron
	Normandy	6 June 1944 – 24 July 1944	549th Bombardment Squadron
	Northern France	25 July 1944 – 14 September 1944	549th Bombardment Squadron
	Rhineland	15 September 1944 – 21 March 1945	549th Bombardment Squadron
	Ardennes-Alsace	16 December 1944 – 25 January 1945	549th Bombardment Squadron
	Central Europe	22 March 1944 – 21 May 1945	549th Bombardment Squadron

== See also ==
- List of United States Air Force missile squadrons
- B-17 Flying Fortress units of the United States Army Air Forces
