= List of Atlas launches (1957–1959) =

== Launch statistics ==
=== Rocket configurations ===
- Atlas-Able
- Atlas A
- Atlas B
- Atlas C
- Atlas D

=== Launch sites ===
- Cape Canaveral LC-11
- Cape Canaveral LC-12
- Cape Canaveral LC-13
- Cape Canaveral LC-14
- Vandenberg LC-576A

=== Launch outcomes ===
- Success
- Partial failure
- Failure

== 1957 ==
Date/Time (UTC)	Rocket	S/N	Launch site	Payload	Function	Orbit	Outcome	Remarks
1957-06-11; 19:37	Atlas A	4A	CCAFS LC-14		ICBM test	Suborbital	Failure	Maiden flight of Atlas A. Thrust section overheating and high vibration levels led to propulsion system failure. RSO T+50 seconds.
1957-09-25; 19:57	Atlas A	6A	CCAFS LC-14		ICBM test	Suborbital	Failure	Thrust section overheating and high vibration levels led to propulsion system failure. RSO T+63 seconds.
1957-12-17; 17:39	Atlas A	12A	CCAFS LC-14		ICBM test	Suborbital	Success	

== 1958 ==
Date/Time (UTC)	Rocket	S/N	Launch site	Payload	Function	Orbit	Outcome	Remarks
1958-01-10; 15:48	Atlas A	10A	CCAFS LC-12		ICBM test	Suborbital	Success	
1958-02-07; 19:37	Atlas A	13A	CCAFS LC-14		ICBM test	Suborbital	Failure	Vernier feedback transducer short lead to missile tumbling and engine shutdown. Missile self-destructed T+164 seconds.
1958-02-20; 17:46	Atlas A	11A	CCAFS LC-12		ICBM test	Suborbital	Failure	Vernier feedback transducer short lead to missile tumbling and engine shutdown. Missile self-destructed T+126 seconds.
1958-04-05; 17:01	Atlas A	15A	CCAFS LC-14		ICBM test	Suborbital	Failure	Turbopump failure T+105 seconds. Missile remained structurally intact until impacting the ocean.
1958-06-03; 21:28	Atlas A	16A	CCAFS LC-12		ICBM test	Suborbital	Success	Final flight of Atlas A
1958-07-19; 17:36	Atlas B	3B	CCAFS LC-11		ICBM test	Suborbital	Failure	Maiden flight of Atlas B. Yaw gyro failure resulted in loss of control. Missile self-destructed T+43 seconds.
1958-08-02; 22:16	Atlas B	4B	CCAFS LC-13		ICBM test	Suborbital	Success	
1958-08-29; 04:30	Atlas B	5B	CCAFS LC-11		ICBM test	Suborbital	Success	
1958-09-14; 05:24	Atlas B	8B	CCAFS LC-14		ICBM test	Suborbital	Success	
1958-09-18; 21:27	Atlas B	6B	CCAFS LC-13		ICBM test	Suborbital	Failure	Turbopump failure resulted in booster engine shutdown T+80 seconds. Missile destroyed itself T+82 seconds.
1958-11-18; 04:00	Atlas B	9B	CCAFS LC-11		ICBM test	Suborbital	Partial failure	Excessive fuel consumption due to mismatched turbopumps resulted in premature sustainer cutoff. Planned range not achieved.
1958-11-29; 02:27	Atlas B	12B	CCAFS LC-14		ICBM test	Suborbital	Success	
1958-12-18; 23:02	Atlas B	10B	CCAFS LC-11	SCORE	Comsat	LEO	Success	First use of an Atlas vehicle for a space launch.
1958-12-24; 04:45	Atlas C	3C	CCAFS LC-12		ICBM test	Suborbital	Success	Maiden flight of Atlas C

== 1959 ==
Date/Time (UTC)	Rocket	S/N	Launch site	Payload	Function	Orbit	Outcome	Remarks
1959-01-16; 04:00	Atlas B	13B	CCAFS LC-14		ICBM test	Suborbital	Failure	Unexplained control and propulsion system difficulties starting at T+100 seconds, followed by engine shutdown T+121 seconds. No T/M aboard missile.
1959-01-27; 23:34	Atlas C	4C	CCAFS LC-12		ICBM test	Suborbital	Partial failure	Guidance system failure T+80 seconds, however the flight control system kept the missile on course. Reentry vehicle not recovered.
1959-02-04; 08:01	Atlas B	11B	CCAFS LC-11		ICBM test	Suborbital	Success	Final flight of Atlas B
1959-02-20; 05:38	Atlas C	5C	CCAFS LC-12		ICBM test	Suborbital	Failure	Fuel staging disconnect valve failed to close at booster jettison, resulting in loss of tank pressure. Missile destroyed itself T+172 seconds.
1959-03-19; 00:59	Atlas C	7C	CCAFS LC-12		ICBM test	Suborbital	Failure	Electrical glitches caused guidance system failure and premature booster engine shutdown, leading to unstable flight trajectory. RVX-2A reentry vehicle not recovered.
1959-04-14; 21:46	Atlas D	3D	CCAFS LC-13		ICBM test	Suborbital	Failure	Maiden flight of Atlas D. LOX fill/drain valve failed to close at liftoff, leading to booster section explosion T+26 seconds. RSO T+36 seconds.
1959-05-19; 04:30	Atlas D	7D	CCAFS LC-14		ICBM test	Suborbital	Failure	Launcher hold-down arm malfunction damaged missile at liftoff, causing loss of tank pressure during ascent. Missile destroyed itself T+64 seconds.
1959-06-06; 17:39	Atlas D	5D	CCAFS LC-13		ICBM test	Suborbital	Failure	Fuel staging disconnect valve failed to close at booster jettison, resulting in loss of tank pressure. Missile destroyed itself T+157 seconds.
1959-07-21; 05:22	Atlas C	8C	CCAFS LC-12		ICBM test	Suborbital	Success	
1959-07-29; 04:10	Atlas D	11D	CCAFS LC-11		ICBM test	Suborbital	Success	
1959-08-11; 18:01	Atlas D	14D	CCAFS LC-13		ICBM test	Suborbital	Success	
1959-08-24; 15:53	Atlas C	11C	CCAFS LC-12		ICBM test	Suborbital	Success	Final flight of Atlas C. RVX-1 reentry vehicle equipped with a camera package photographed the Earth and was recovered after a 250-mile suborbital lob.
1959-09-09; 08:19	Atlas D	10D	CCAFS LC-14	Big Joe 1	Mercury test	Suborbital	Partial failure	Booster jettison failed due to bad electrical contacts. Planned range not achieved. Boilerplate Mercury capsule successfully recovered.
1959-09-09; 17:50:42	Atlas D	12D	VAFB LC-576A-2		ICBM test	Suborbital	Success	First Atlas launch from Vandenberg
1959-09-17; 02:09	Atlas D	17D	CCAFS LC-13		ICBM test	Suborbital	Success	
1959-10-06; 05:55	Atlas D	18D	CCAFS LC-11		ICBM test	Suborbital	Success	
1959-10-10; 03:10	Atlas D	22D	CCAFS LC-13		ICBM test	Suborbital	Success	
1959-10-29; 07:20	Atlas D	26D	CCAFS LC-11		ICBM test	Suborbital	Partial failure	One vernier shut down at staging due to a ruptured LOX duct. Roll control lost, missile impacted short of its intended range.
1959-11-04; 21:37	Atlas D	28D	CCAFS LC-13		ICBM test	Suborbital	Partial failure	Short in impact predictor system leads to Range Safety Officer issuing erroneous manual cutoff command T+274 seconds. Missile impacted short of its intended range.
1959-11-24; 19:48	Atlas D	15D	CCAFS LC-13		ICBM test	Suborbital	Success	
1959-11-26; 07:26	Atlas-Able	20D	CCAFS LC-14	Pioneer P-3	Lunar probe	HEO (target)	Failure	Maiden flight of Atlas-Able. Payload fairing broke up at T+45 seconds, leading to loss of the upper stages and payload. Atlas performed normally.
1959-12-09; 00:10	Atlas D	31D	CCAFS LC-13		ICBM test	Suborbital	Success	
1959-12-19; 00:48	Atlas D	40D	CCAFS LC-13		ICBM test	Suborbital	Success	First use of a "dry" engine start on an Atlas (igniter activated prior to propellant injection)

== Main Page ==
- List of Atlas launches
