= List of missile wings of the United States Air Force =

This is a list of missile wings activated by the United States Air Force during and after the Cold War. Although most of these wings included the word "missile" in their designations, the majority of units operating Convair SM-65 Atlas and Martin SM-68A Titan I intercontinental ballistic missiles were strategic wings or strategic aerospace wings, which combined missile, bomber and air refueling units. The dates for these wings are the dates that they had missile squadrons assigned, rather than their activation and inactivation dates.

The list is organized numerically by weapons system designation, using the Air Force system in use until the tri-service aircraft designation system came into effect for missiles with such designation. Within missile types, wings are ordered numerically by wing designation.

== Martin TM-61 (MGM-1) Matador and TM-61B (TM-76, MGM-13B, CGM-13C) Mace ==
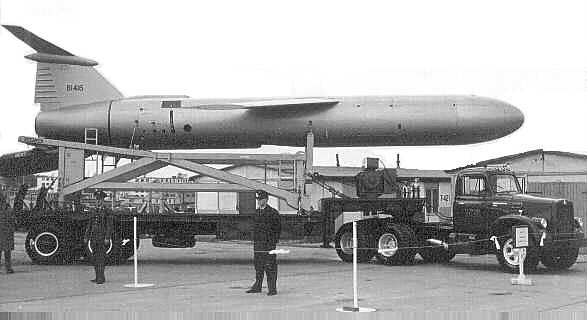
Martin TM-611 Matador

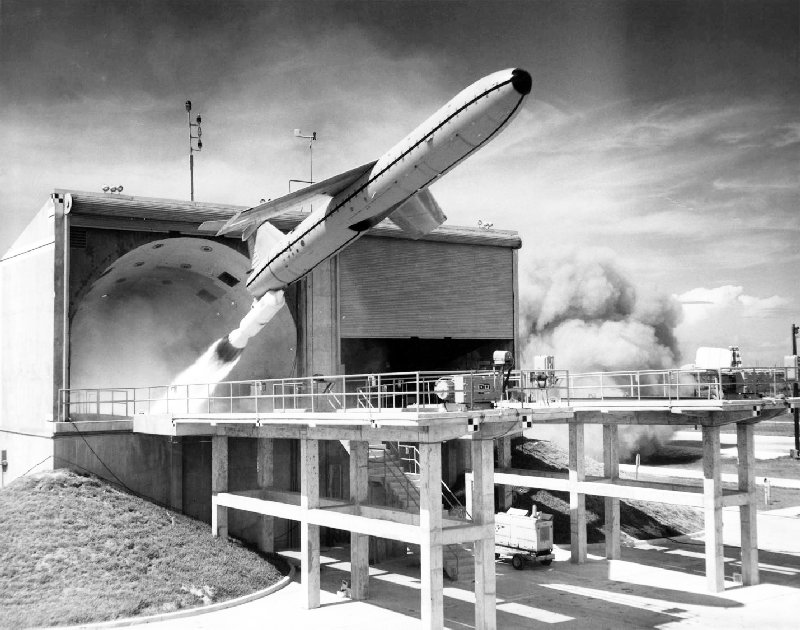
Martin TM-76 Mace

The Martin MGM-1 Matador was the first operational surface-to-surface cruise missile designed and built by the United States. The Matador included a radio command that allowed in-flight course corrections. The Matador was armed with the W5 warhead.

The Martin TM-76 Mace was originally the TM-61B, a tactical cruise missile developed as an improved TM-61 Matador. The MGM-13B was launched from a transporter erector launcher and the CGM-13C was launched from an underground bunker. While the MGM-13B was equipped with terrain-matching radar navigation, the CGM-13C used an inertial navigation system.

Wings operating the TM-61 Matador and TM-76 Mace

Wing	Dates active	Station	Missile squadron(s)	Notes
38th Tactical Missile Wing	18 June 1958 – 25 September 1966	Hahn AB	71st 89th 405th 822nd 823rd 887th	(Note: Replaced 701st Tactical Missile Wing. Ravenstein, p. 67) TM-61, TM-76
701st Tactical Missile Wing	15 September 1956 – 18 June 1958	Hahn AB	1st 11th 69th	(Note: Replaced by 38th Tactical Missile Wing. Ravenstein, p. 67) TM-61
4504th Missile Training Wing (also 4504th Tactical Missile Wing, 4504th Combat Crew Training Wing)	c. 1 September 1954 – 1 July 1959	Orlando AFB	11th 17th 24th 4504th	TM-61, TM-76

== Northrop SM-62 Snark ==
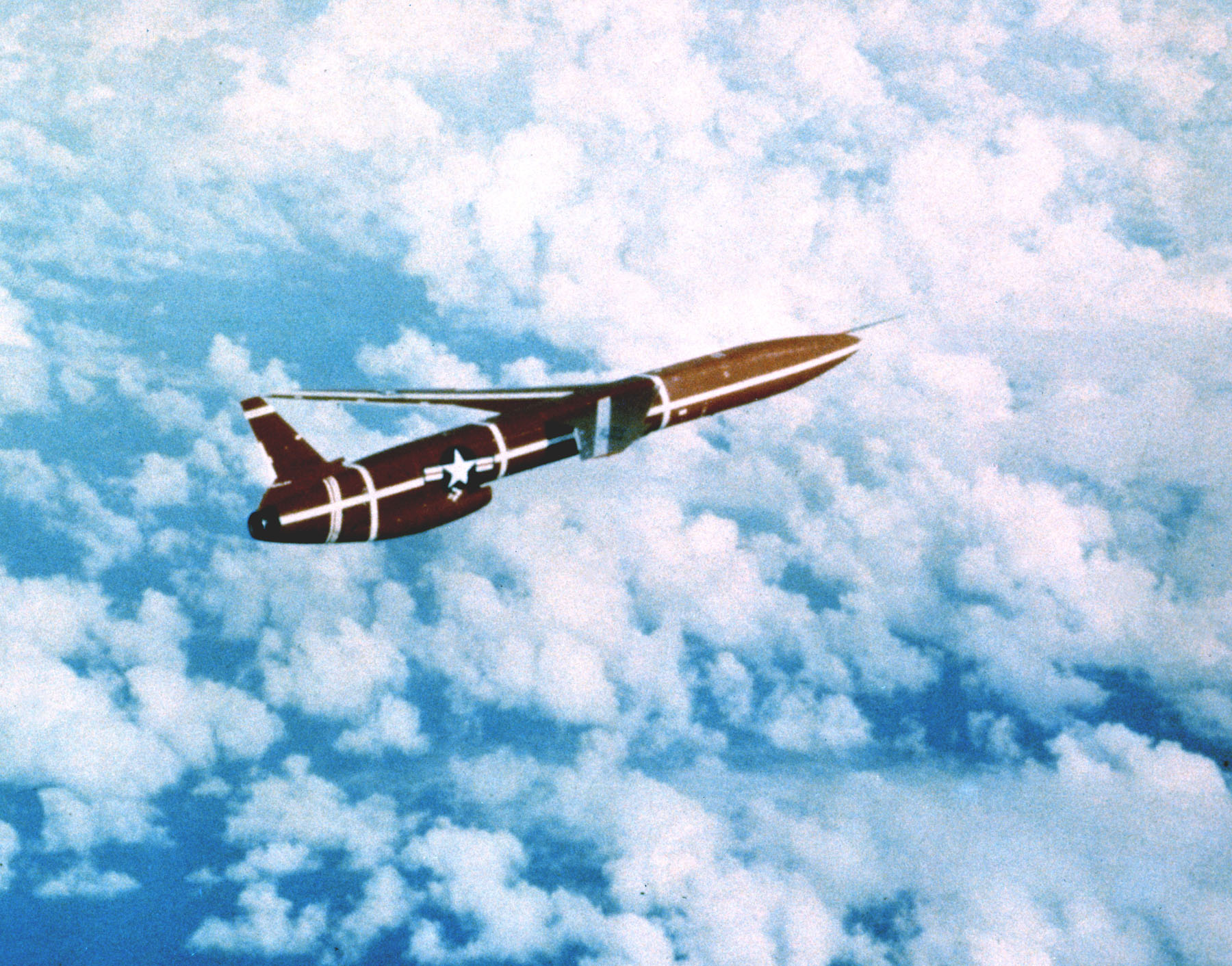
Northrop SM-62 Snark

The Northrop SM-62 Snark was an early-model intercontinental cruise missile that could carry a W39 nuclear warhead. The Snark was deployed from 1958 through 1961. It represented an important step in weapons technology during the Cold War.

Wings operating the SM-62 Snark

Wing	Dates active	Station	Missile squadron(s)	Notes
702nd Strategic Missile Wing	1 January 1959 – 25 June 1961	Presque Isle AFB	556th (Note: The squadron was located at Patrick AFB until July 1959. When it moved to Presque Isle, it was inactivated and the missiles were assigned directly to the wing.)	

== Convair SM-65 (CGM-16D, CGM-16E, HGM-16F) Atlas ==
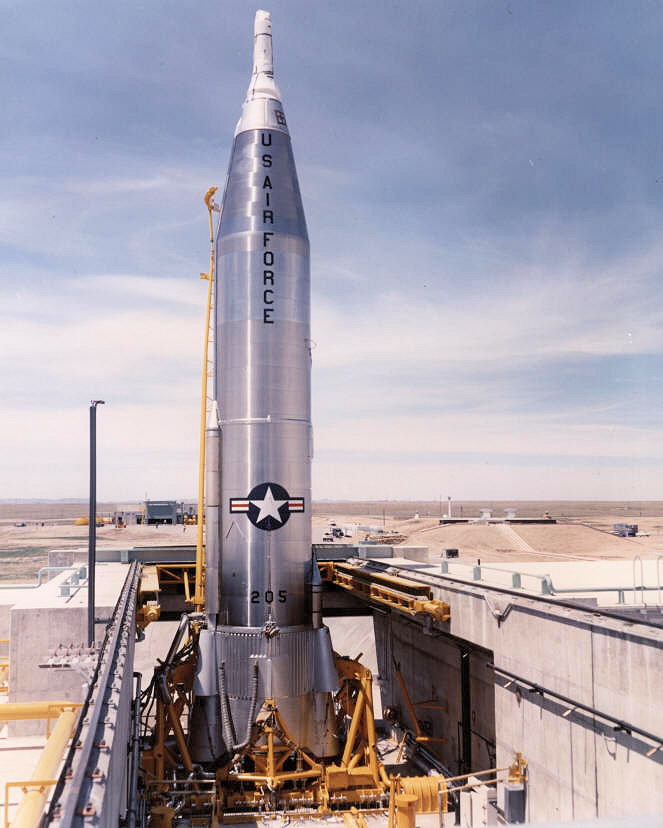
SM-65D Atlas

The Convair SM-65 Atlas was the United States' first successful ICBM, flown in 1957, and taken out of active service in 1965. Strategic Air Command deployed Atlas model D, Atlas model E, and Atlas model F. The Atlas used liquid fuel and it took 15 minutes to pump 249,000 pounds of propellant aboard the "quick firing" Atlas F. However, it was dangerous, as four Atlas silos were destroyed when propellant-loading exercises went awry.

Wings operating the SM-65 Atlas

Wing	Dates active	Stations	Missile squadron(s)	Notes
Strategic Wing (Provisional)	15 January 1958 1958 – 1 February 1958	Francis E. Warren AFB	none	(Note: Predecessor to 4320th Strategic Wing)
6th Strategic Aerospace Wing	1 September 1961 – 25 March 1965	Walker AFB	579th	SM-65E
11th Strategic Aerospace Wing	1 June 1961 – 25 March 1965	Altus AFB	577th	SM-65E
40th Strategic Aerospace Wing	1 January 1964 – 1 September 1964	Forbes AFB	558th	SM-65E
55th Strategic Reconnaissance Wing	1 September 1964 – 25 March 1965	Offutt AFB	548th (Note: In 1964, the 40th Strategic Aerospace Wing was inactivated and SAC transferred Forbes to Tactical Air Command. For the seven months until the 548th Squadron was inactivated, it was transferred to the 55th Wing.)	SM-65E
92nd Strategic Aerospace Wing	1 April 1960 – 25 June 1965	Fairchild AFB	567th	SM-65E
96th Strategic Aerospace Wing	1 July 1961 – 25 March 1965	Dyess AFB	578th	SM-65E
98th Strategic Aerospace Wing	1 January 1964 – 25 June 1965	Lincoln AFB	551st	SM-65E
310th Strategic Aerospace Wing	1 April 1961 – 25 June 1965	Schilling AFB	550th	SM-65F
385th Strategic Aerospace Wing	1 January 1963 – 15 December 1964	Offutt AFB	549th	(Note: The wing replaced the 4321st Strategic Wing) SM-65D
389th Strategic Missile Wing	1 July 1961 – 25 March 1965	Francis E. Warren AFB	564th 565th 566th	(Note: The wing replaced the 706th Strategic Missile Wing) SM-65D, SM-65E
706th Strategic Missile Wing	23 February 1958 – 1 July 1961	Francis E. Warren AFB	549th 564th 565th	(Note: The wing was replaced by the 389th Strategic Missile Wing) SM-65D
4320th Strategic Wing	1 February 1958 – 23 February 1958	Francis E. Warren AFB		(Note: Predecessor to 706th Strategic Missile Wing)

== Martin SM-68A (HGM-25A) Titan I ==
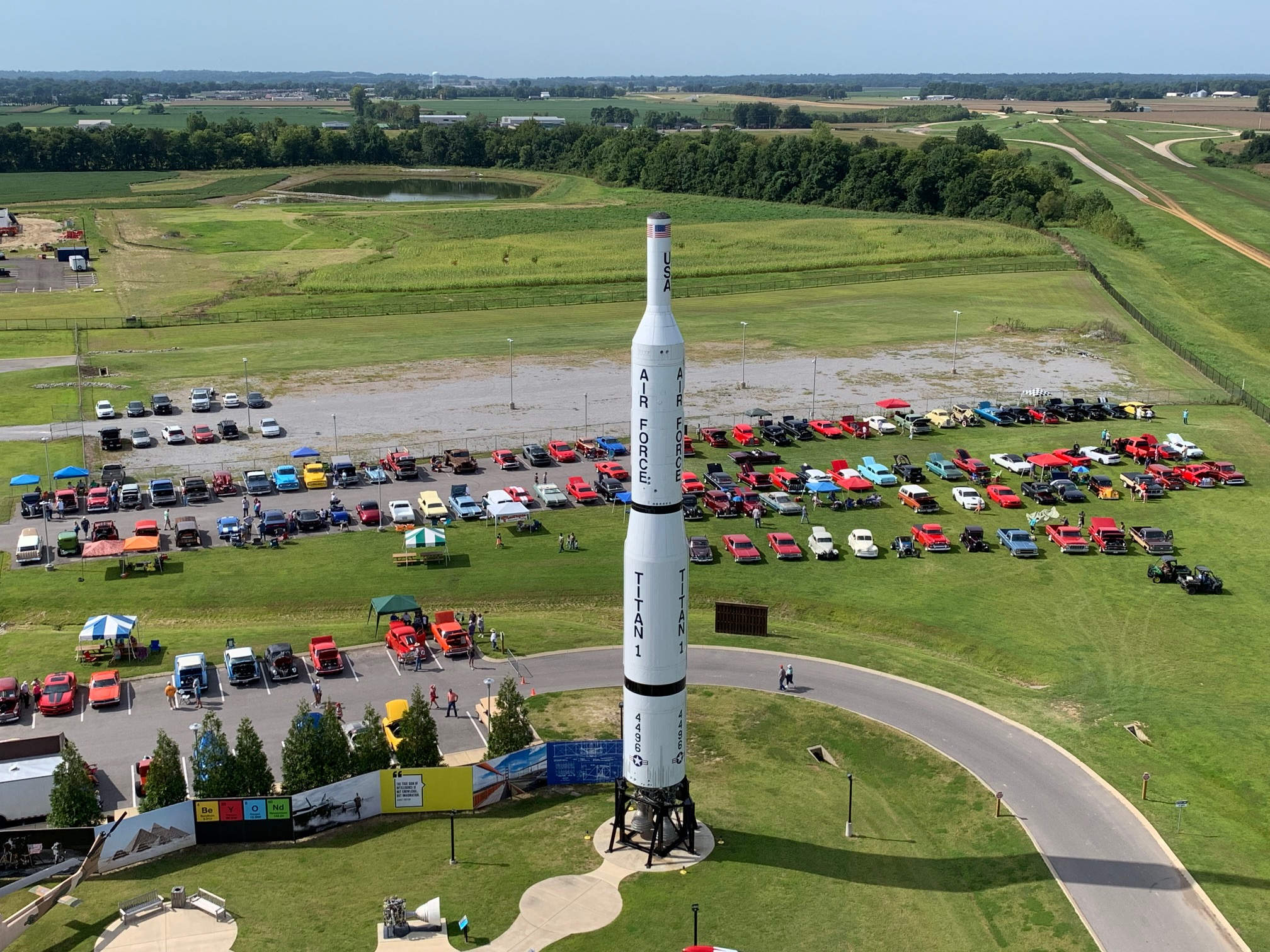
Titan I at Discovery Park of America

The Martin HGM-25A Titan I was the United States' first multistage intercontinental ballistic missile. It required liquid fuel. Originally designed as a backup in case SM-65 Atlas missile development ran into problems, the Titan was ultimately beaten into service by Atlas. Deployment went ahead anyway to more rapidly increase the number of missiles on alert and because the Titan's missile silo basing was more survivable than Atlas.

Wings operating the SM 68A (HGM-25A) Titan I

Wing	Dates active	Station	Missile squadron(s)	Notes
9th Strategic Aerospace Wing	1 June 1961 – 25 June 1965	Mountain Home AFB	569th	
28th Bombardment Wing	1 December 1960 – 1 January 1962	Ellsworth AFB	850th	
44th Strategic Missile Wing	1 January 1962 – 25 March 1965	Ellsworth AFB	850th	
451st Strategic Missile Wing	1 July 1961 – 25 June 1965	Lowry AFB	724th 725th	(Note: Replaced 703rd Strategic Missile Wing.)
456th Strategic Aerospace Wing	1 February 1963 – 25 March 1965	Beale AFB	851st	(Note: Replaced 4129th Strategic Wing.)
462nd Strategic Aerospace Wing	1 February 1963 – 25 March 1965	Larson AFB	568th	(Note: Replaced 4170th Strategic Wing.)
703rd Strategic Missile Wing	25 September 1958 – 1 July 1961	Lowry AFB	848th 849th	(Note: Replaced by 451st Strategic Missile Wing.)
4126th Strategic Wing	1 February 1961 – 1 February 1963	Beale AFB	851st	(Note: Replaced by 456th Strategic Aerospace Wing.)
4170th Strategic Wing	1 April 1961 – 1 February 1963	Larson AFB	568th	(Note: Replaced by 462nd Strategic Aerospace Wing.)

== Martin SM-68C (LGM-25C) Titan II ==
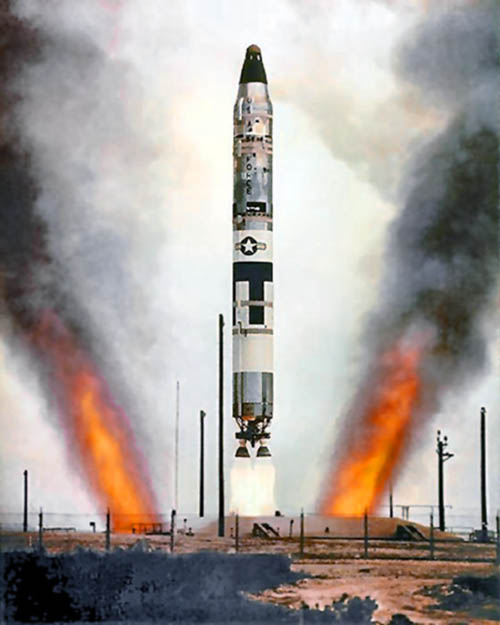
Test launch of a Titan II during the mid 1960s

The Martin LGM-25C Titan II carried a payload twice as heavy as the Titan I. It also used storable propellants, which reduced the time to launch and permitted it to be launched from its silo. Titan II carried the W53 warhead, making it the most powerful ICBM in the US arsenal.

Wings operating the SM 68C (HGM-25C) Titan II

Wing	Dates active	Station	Missile squadron(s)	Notes
308th Strategic Missile Wing	1 April 1962 – 18 August 1987	Little Rock AFB	373rd 374th	
381st Strategic Missile Wing	1 March 1962 – 8 August 1986	McConnell AFB	532nd 533rd	
390th Strategic Missile Wing	1 January 1962 – 31 July 1984	Davis-Monthan AFB	570th 571st	

== Douglas SM-75 (PGM-17) Thor ==
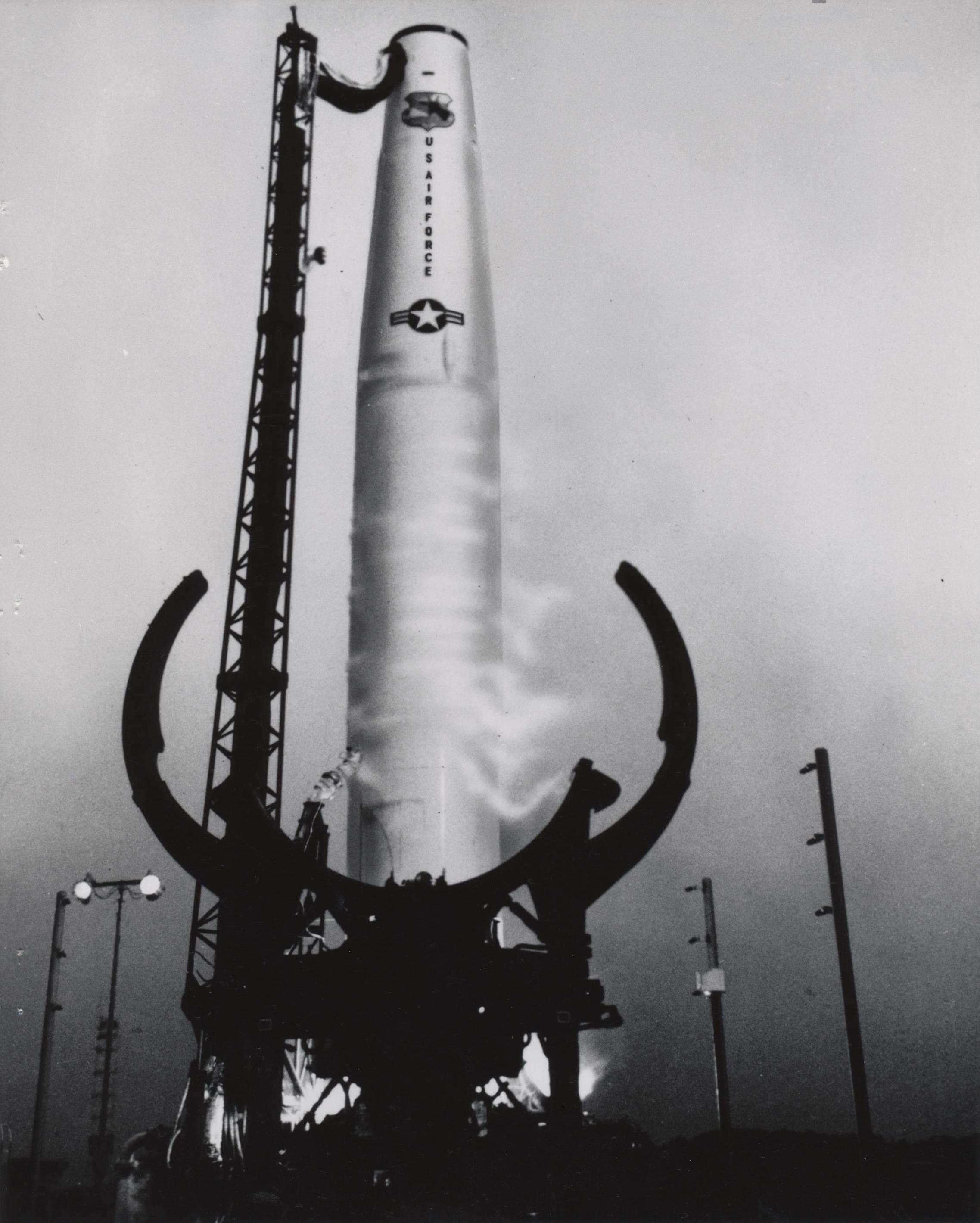
Thor launch

The Douglas SM-75 Thor was the first operational ballistic missile of the United States Air Force (USAF). Named after the Norse god of thunder, it was deployed in the United Kingdom between 1959 and September 1963.

Wings operating the SM-75 Thor

Wing	Dates active	Stations	Missile squadron(s)	Notes
705th Strategic Missile Wing	20 February 1958 – 1 April 1960	RAF Lakenheath; South Ruislip Air Station	672nd	Trained Royal Air Force units.

== Boeing IM-99 (CIM-10) BOMARC ==
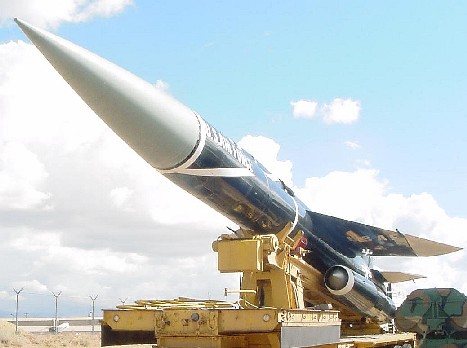
IM-99A BOMARC missile

The Boeing IM-99 BOMARC (Boeing Michigan Aeronautical Research Center) was a supersonic ramjet powered long-range surface-to-air missile (SAM) used during the Cold War for the air defense of North America. In addition to being the first operational long-range SAM and the first operational pulse doppler aviation radar, it was the only SAM deployed by the United States Air Force.

Wings operating the IM-99 BOMARC

Wing	Dates active	Stations	Missile squadron(s)	Notes
4751st Air Defense Missile Wing (later 4751st Air Defense Wing)	1 October 1957 – 1 July 1962	Hurlburt Field	4751st	

== LGM-30 Minuteman ==
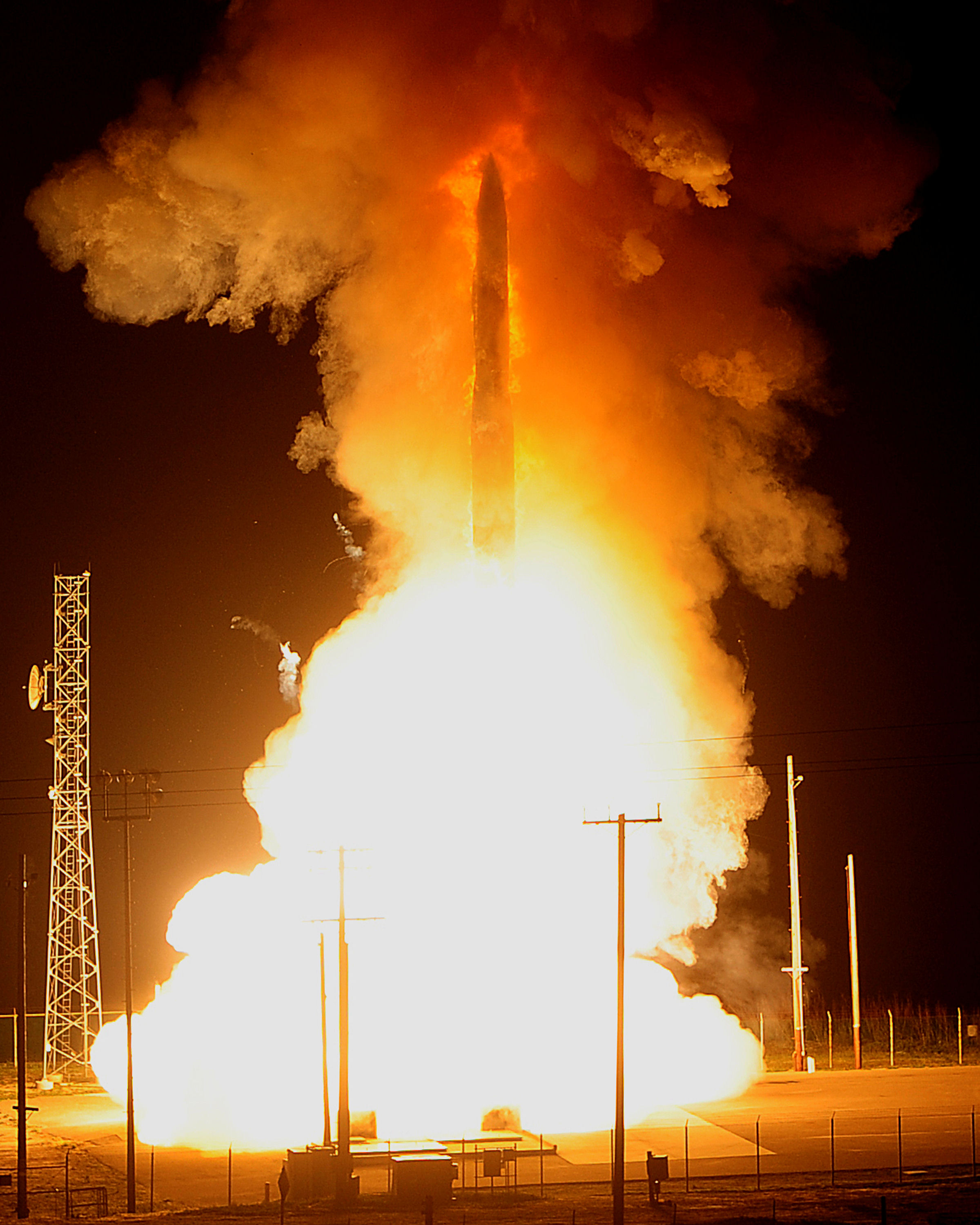
Minuteman III launch

The LGM-30 Minuteman, first flown in 1961 was developed to replace the hazards inherent in the caustic, volatile liquid-fuel systems of the Atlas and Titan ICBMs. Two innovations gave the Minuteman a long practical service life: a solid rocket booster making the Minuteman faster to launch than other ICBMs, and a digital flight computer, one of the first recognizably modern embedded systems.

Wings operating LGM-30 Minuteman

Wing	Dates active	Station	Missile squadron(s)	Notes
44th Strategic Missile Wing (also 44th Missile Wing	1 July 1963 – 5 July 1994	Ellsworth AFB	66th 67th 68th	LGM-30B Minuteman I, 1963 to 1973 LGM-30F Minuteman II, 1971 to 1994
90th Strategic Missile Wing (also 90th Missile Wing, 90th Space Wing)	1 July 1963 – present	Francis E. Warren AFB	319th 320th 321st 400th	
91st Strategic Missile Wing (also 91st Missile Wing, 91st Space Wing)	25 June 1968 – present	Minot AFB	740th 741st 742nd	(Note: Replaced 455th Strategic Missile Wing.) LGM-30B Minuteman I, 1968 to 1972 LGM-30G Minuteman III, 1972 to present
321st Strategic Missile Wing (also 321st Missile Wing, 321st Missile Group)	15 July 1961 – 1 July 1994 (Note: It continued to operate missiles until 1998 as a group)	Grand Forks AFB	: 446th 447th 448th	LGM-30F Minuteman II, 1965 to 1973 LGM-30G Minuteman III, 1972 to 1998
341st Strategic Missile Wing (also 341st Missile Wing, 341st Space Wing)	14 August 1964 – present	Malmstrom AFB	10th 12th 490th 564th	LGM-30A Minuteman I 1962 to 1964 LGM-30B Minuteman I 1964 to 1969 LGM-30F Minuteman II, 1967 to 1996 LGM-30G Minuteman III, 1975 (564 SMS); 1996 (10, 12, 490 SMS) to present
351st Strategic Missile Wing (also 351st Missile Wing)	15 February 1963 – 31 July 1995	Whiteman AFB	508th 509th 510th	LGM-30B Minuteman I, 1963 to 1967 LGM-30F Minuteman II, 1966 to 1995
455th Strategic Missile Wing	28 June 1962 – 25 June 1968	Minot AFB	740th 741st 742nd	(Note: Replaced by 91st Strategic Missile Wing.) LGM-30B Minuteman I
4062nd Strategic Missile Wing	1 December 1960 – 20 February 1962	Hill AFB		

== General Dynamics BGM-109 Gryphon ==
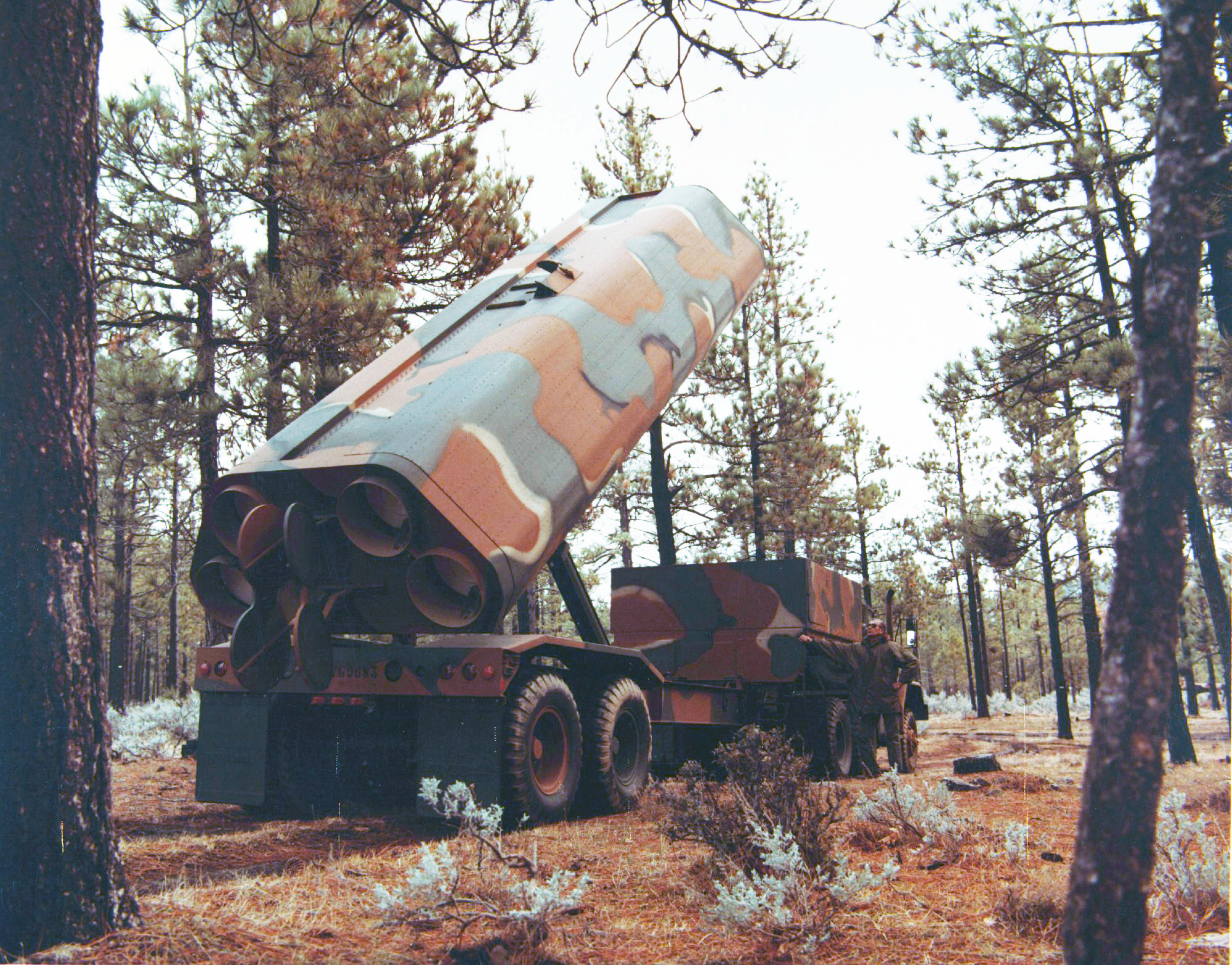
BGM-109G Launcher

The General Dynamics BGM-109G Gryphon was a ground-launched cruise missile developed by the United States Air Force in the last decade of the Cold War with a W80 warhead.It was developed as a counter to the mobile nuclear missiles deployed by the Soviet Union in Eastern Bloc European countries. It was removed from service under the Intermediate-Range Nuclear Forces Treaty.

Wings operating BGM-109 Gryphon

Wing	Dates active	Station	Missile squadron(s)	Notes
303rd Tactical Missile Wing	12 December 1986 – 31 January 1989	RAF Molesworth	87th	BGM-109G
485th Tactical Missile Wing	1 August 1984 – 30 April 1989	Florennes AB	71st	BGM-109G
486th Tactical Missile Wing	27 August 1987 – 30 September 1988	Woensdrecht AB	405th	BGM-109G
487th Tactical Missile Wing	30 June 1983 – c. 27 May 1991	Comiso AS	302nd	BGM-109G
501st Tactical Missile Wing	1 July 1982 – 4 June 1991	RAF Greenham Common	11th	BGM-109G

== LGM-118 Peacekeeper ==
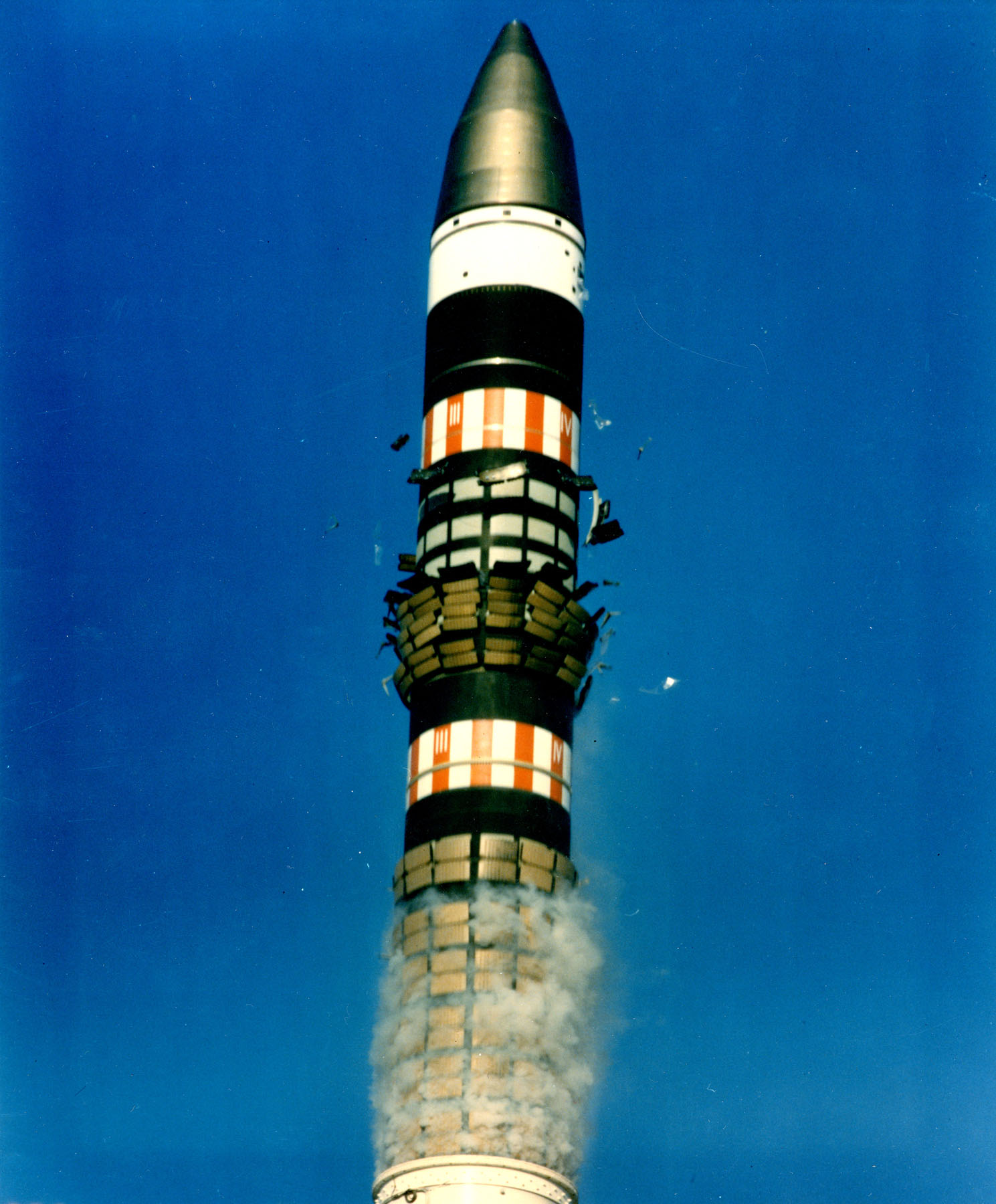
LGM-118 Peacekeeper launch

The LGM-118 Peacekeeper, initially known as the MX (for Missile-eXperimental), was a land-based ICBM. A total of 50 missiles were deployed. They were withdrawn from service by 2005 to comply with the Strategic Arms Limitation Talks. Armed with up to 10 re-entry vehicles, each carrying a W87 warhead, the Peacekeeper was the most powerful ICBM deployed by the United States.

Wings operating LGM-118 Peacekeeper

Wing	Dates active	Station	Missile squadron(s)	Notes
90th Strategic Missile Wing (also 90th Missile Wing, 90th Space Wing)	October 1986 – 10 October 2005	Francis E. Warren AFB	400th	

== Multiple missile systems ==
Wings operating multiple missile systems

Wing	Dates active	Station	Missile squadron(s)	Notes
392nd Strategic Missile Wing	18 October 1961 – 20 December 1961	Vandenberg AFB	392nd 394th 395th 576th	Atlas, Minuteman, Titan
550th Guided Missiles Wing	20 July 1949 – 30 December 1950	Eglin AFB; Patrick AFB	1st 2nd 3rd	Lark, Matador, GAPA, Falcon, Shrike, Rascal, Snark, Boojum
704th Strategic Missile Wing	1 July 1957 – 1 July 1959	Vandenberg AFB	392nd 394th 395th 576th 644th 672nd 864th 865th 866th	Atlas, Jupiter, Thor, Titan
4800th Guided Missiles Wing (later 6555th Guided Missiles Wing, 6555th Guided Missile Wing, 6555th Guided Missile Group)	30 December 1950 – 1954	Patrick AFB	1st 69th 4802nd (later 6555th) 4803rd (later 6556th) 6545th 6546th (later 6546th Operations Squadron) 6547th (later 6547th Operations Squadron)	
6540th Missile Test Wing (later 6580th Missile Test Wing)	c. 30 Jun 1951 – 1 September 1952	Holloman AFB	6580th	(Note: Was 2754th Experimental Wing, redesignated Holloman Air Development Test Center.)
6541st Missile Test Wing (also 6541st Operations Group)	4 September 1951 – c. 1 March 1953	Patrick AFB	none	
6580th Missile Test Wing	1 September 1952 – 10 October 1952	see 6540th Missile Test Wing.		
