= 494th Air Expeditionary Group =

Provisional United States Air Force unit

494th Air Expeditionary Group

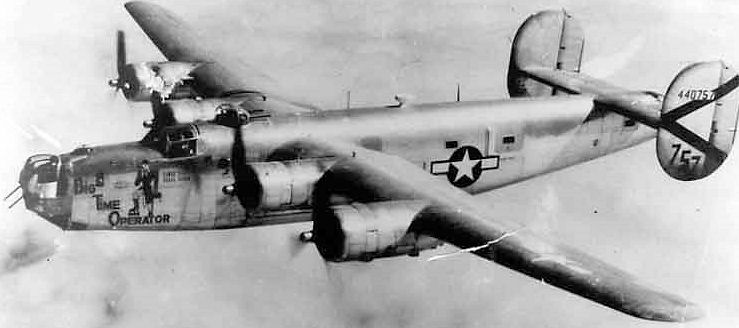
- Consolidated B-24J of the 864th Bombardment Squadron c. 1945.
- Active: 1943–1946, 1963–1966, 2002-unknown
- Country: United States
- Branch: United States Air Force
- Part of: Air Mobility Command

Insignia
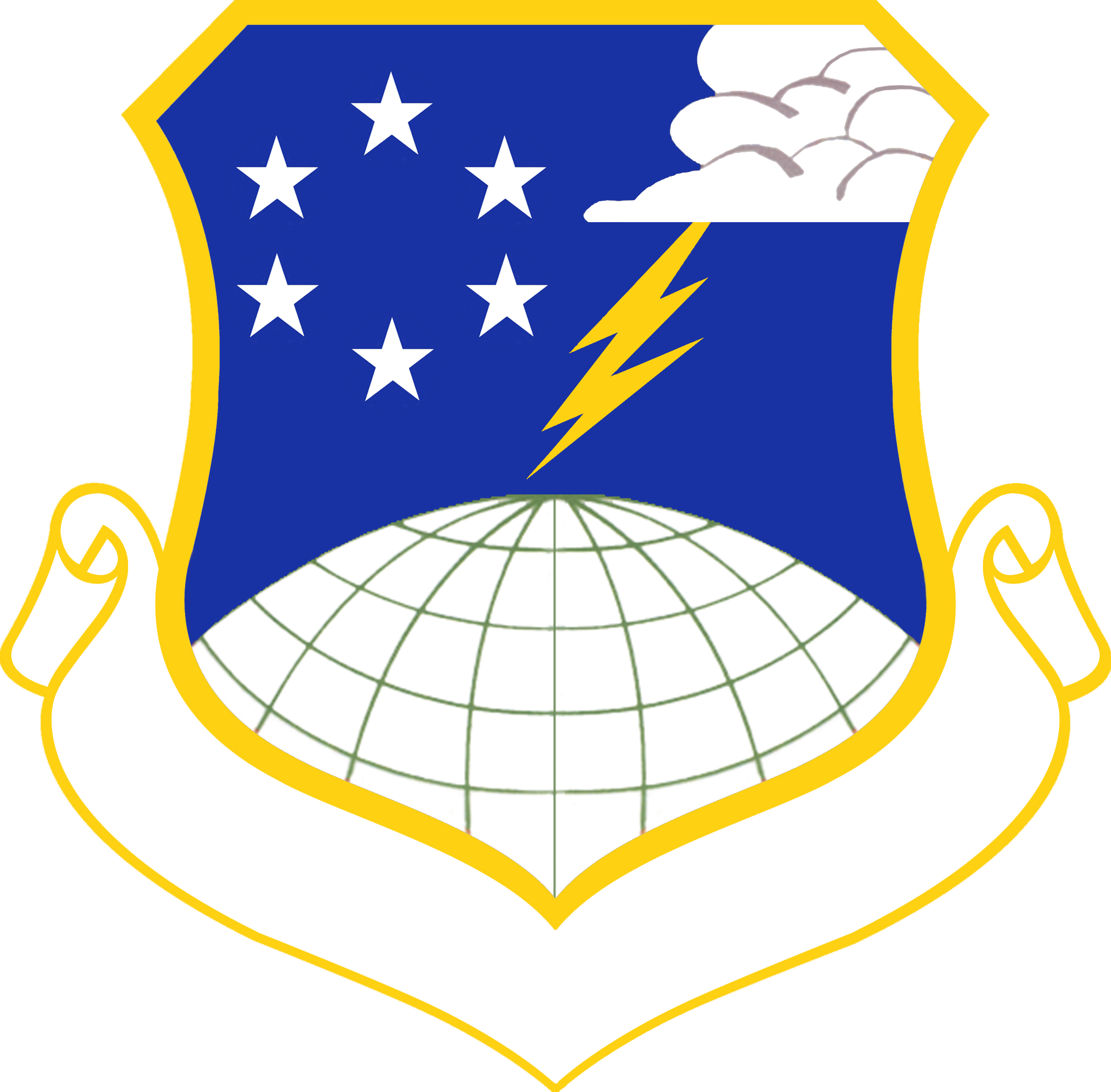
- 494th Bombardment Wing Emblem (approved 11 February 1964)

The 494th Air Expeditionary Group is a provisional United States Air Force group assigned to Air Mobility Command (AMC) to activate or inactivate as needed. The group was activated in the events surrounding Operation Iraqi Freedom, the 2003 United States invasion of Iraq. Now-Lieutenant General Stayce D. Harris is listed by the USAF as commanding the 494th AEG at Moron Air Base, Spain, from July to October 2003. In addition, a patch published at USAF Patches.com implies that the group was active in Spain during "Iraqi Freedom." (Note: The patch incorporates a map of Spain, the colors of the Spanish Flag, and Don Quixote as its main elements.)

The group was originally activated in 1943 as the 494th Bombardment Group. It was the last B-24 Liberator group formed by the United States Army Air Forces. The unit served primarily in Western Pacific, taking part in numerous campaigns. It earned the Philippine Presidential Unit Citation for its actions during the liberation of the Philippines.

It was then active during the Cold War as the 494th Bombardment Wing a Strategic Air Command unit, flying Boeing B-52 Stratofortress and Boeing KC-135 Stratotanker aircraft at Sheppard Air Force Base, Texas from 1962 1966.

== History ==
=== World War II ===
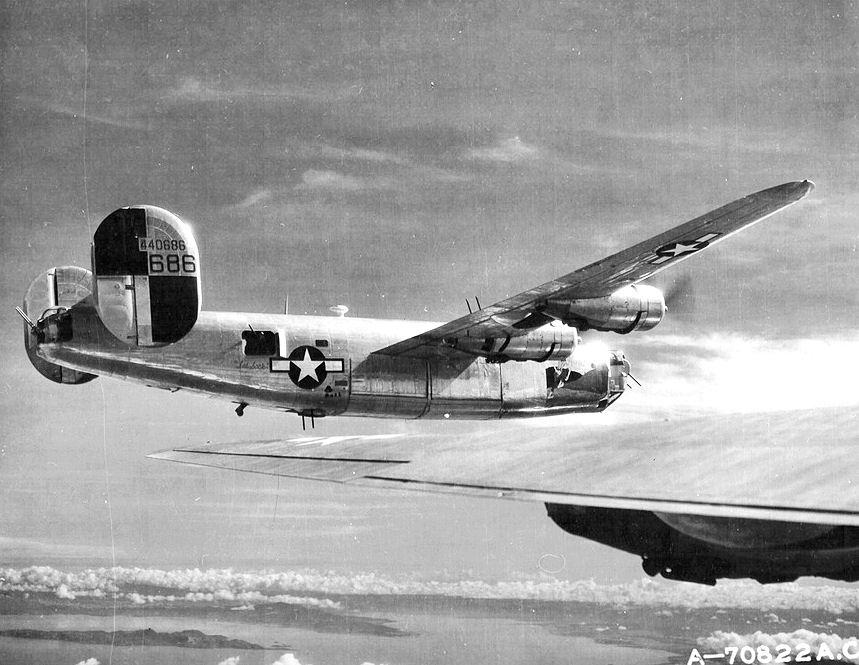
Consolidated B-24J of the 867th Bombardment Squadron

The group was established in late 1943 as the 494th Bombardment Group, a Consolidated B-24 Liberator heavy bombardment group, and activated on 1 December at Wendover Field, Utah. Its initial squadrons were the 864th, 865th, 866th, and 867th Bombardment Squadrons (BS). The 494th was the last of seven heavy bombardment Groups – 488th through 494th – activated in the autumn of 1943, as B-29 Superfortress production was beginning in large numbers. The 494th was subsequently the last heavy bomb group formed and trained by the Army Air Forces.

The group's origins begin when the 10th Antisubmarine Squadron moved to Gowen Field, Idaho to retrain as a heavy bombardment unit with B-24s. At Gowen, the unit was renamed the 867th BS and moved to Wendover Field, Utah where it was joined by the newly activated 864th, 865th and 866th BS. The headquarters element of the group was formed from the staff of the 10th Antisubmarine Squadron. The group trained at Wendover until April when the base was converted by Second Air Force for B-29 training. It moved to Mountain Home Army Air Field, Idaho to complete its final phase of training. At Mountain Home, the group received new very long range B-24J aircraft in early May.

The group was dispatched to the Pacific, initially to Barking Sands Army Airfield in Hawaii. It flew from Idaho to Hamilton Field, California before its overseas movement. In Hawaii, the group received additional training in long range ocean navigation while the ground echelon of the group moved by rail to Seattle, then by troop ship to Hawaii, arriving in mid-June. The unit remained in Hawaii throughout the summer of 1944 while its B-24s were modified at Hickam Field to meet the standards required by Seventh Air Force. Modifications were completed by 1 August, however the group was not deployed to the Southwest Pacific Area until mid-September as its planned airfield on Angaur in the Palau Islands was not yet constructed due to ongoing combat on the island.

Aircraft were deployed from Hawaii on 10 October 1944, departing for Johnston Island, Kwajalein and Saipan. At Saipan, the unit was delayed a further 10 days due to combat ongoing in the Pelelieus. On Saipan, the 494th flew their first combat mission with crews of the 30th Bombardment Group, stationed on Saipan. The first elements of the 494th arrived on Angaur on 16 October, being strafed by Japanese forces still on the island as the battle of Bloody-Nose Ridge was still ongoing. As the area was finally secured in late October, additional aircraft began arriving; with the group completely established by the end of the month. The combat on the island had not allowed the construction of buildings and other support facilities, so the personnel of the group were engaged in construction activities upon their arrival.

The 494th entered combat on 3 November 1944 with attacks against Japanese airfields on Yap and Koror. Subsequently, the group engaged in very long range strategic bombing raids on other bypassed Japanese installations in the Pacific and against the Japanese in the Philippines. Late in 1944 the unit hit gun emplacements, personnel areas, ant storage depots on Corregidor and Caballo at the entrance to Manila Bay. It bombed radio installations and power plants at Japanese bases in the Philippines and attacked enemy-held airfields, including Clark Field on Luzon. Early in 1945 it struck airfields on Mindanao and ammunition and supply dumps in the Davao Gulf and Illana Bay areas.

The group moved to the newly built Yontan Airfield on Okinawa in June 1945. On Okinawa, the 373d Bombardment Squadron was assigned to the 494th from the CBI. From its new base, the group engaged primarily in very long range attacks against enemy airfields on Kyūshū. The group also participated in incendiary raids, dropped propaganda leaflets over urban areas of Kyūshū and struck airfields in China, in southern Korea, and around the Inland Sea of Japan until the Japanese capitulation in August.

After the war's end in September, the unit remained on Okinawa as older units began to demobilize. The group was engaged in transporting personnel and supplies in the Southwest Pacific, and moving necessary occupation support elements from Manila to Tokyo. It began to demobilize in November and December, with personnel returning to the United States. the 494th was inactivated as a paper unit in the United States on 4 January 1946.

=== Strategic Air Command ===
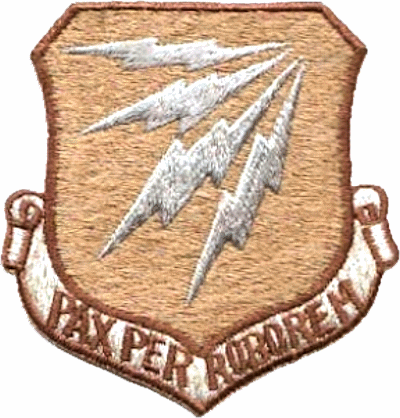
Patch with 4245th Strategic Wing emblem

4245th Strategic Wing

The origins of the 494th Bombardment Wing began on 5 January 1959 when Strategic Air Command (SAC) established the 4245th Strategic Wing as a tenant at Sheppard Air Force Base, Texas, an Air Training Command base and assigned it to the 816th Air Division (later 816th Strategic Aerospace Division) as part of SAC's plan to disperse its Boeing B-52 Stratofortress heavy bombers over a larger number of bases, thus making it more difficult for the Soviet Union to knock out the entire fleet with a surprise first strike. The wing remained a headquarters only until 1 August 1959, when the 61st Aviation Depot Squadron was activated to oversee the wing's special weapons. Two months later, three maintenance squadrons and a squadron to provide security for special weapons were activated and assigned to the wing.

The 4245th finally added its first operational squadron on 1 February 1960 when the 717th Bombardment Squadron (BS), consisting of 15 Boeing B-52 Stratofortresses moved to Sheppard from Ellsworth AFB, South Dakota where it had been one of the three squadrons of the 28th Bombardment Wing. The wing became fully operational on 1 October 1962 when the 900th Air Refueling Squadron, flying Boeing KC-135 Stratotankers, was organized and assigned to the wing. One third of the wing's aircraft were maintained on fifteen-minute alert, fully fueled, armed and ready for combat to reduce vulnerability to a Soviet missile strike. This was increased to half the wing's aircraft in 1962. The 4245th (and later the 494th) continued to maintain an alert commitment until it was inactivated.

494th Bombardment Wing

In 1962, in order to perpetuate the lineage of many currently inactive bombardment units with illustrious World War II records, Headquarters SAC received authority from Headquarters USAF to discontinue its Major Command controlled (MAJCON) strategic wings that were equipped with combat aircraft and to activate Air Force controlled (AFCON) units, most of which were inactive at the time, which could carry a lineage and history. (Note: MAJCON units could not carry a permanent history or lineage. Ravenstein, Guide to Air Force Lineage and Honors, p. 12)

As a result, the 4245th SW was replaced by the newly constituted 494th Bombardment Wing, Heavy (BW), which assumed its mission, personnel, and equipment on 1 February 1963. (Note: Although the 494th Wing was a new organization, it continued, through temporary bestowal, the history, and honors of the World War II 494th Bombardment Group. It was also entitled to retain the honors (but not the history or lineage) of the 4245th. This temporary bestowal ended in January 1984, when the wing and group were consolidated into a single unit. Ravenstein, Combat Wings, Appendix V, USAF Bestowed History) In the same way the 864th Bombardment Squadron, one of the unit's World War II historical bomb squadrons, replaced the 717th BS. The 61st Munitions Maintenance Squadron and the 900th Air Refueling Squadron were reassigned to the 494th. The 4245th's maintenance and security squadrons were replaced by ones with the 494th numerical designation of the newly established wing. Each of the new units assumed the personnel, equipment, and mission of its predecessor. Under the Dual Deputate organization, (Note: Under this plan flying squadrons reported to the wing Deputy Commander for Operations and maintenance squadrons reported to the wing Deputy Commander for Maintenance) all flying and maintenance squadrons were directly assigned to the wing, so no operational group element was activated. The 494th Bomb Wing continued to conduct strategic bombardment training and air refueling operations to meet SAC's operational commitments.

By 1966, Intercontinental ballistic missiles (ICBM) had been deployed and become operational as part of the United States' strategic triad, and the need for B-52s had been reduced. In addition, funds were also needed to cover the costs of combat operations in Indochina. The 494th Bombardment Wing was inactivated on 1 April 1966 and its aircraft were reassigned to other SAC units.

The group was converted to provisional status as the 494th Air Expeditionary Group in mid-2002, and active at Moron Air Base in Spain for a period in 2003.

== Lineage ==
494th Bombardment Group

- Constituted as 494th Bombardment Group (Heavy) on 14 September 1943

Activated on 1 December 1943
Redesignated as 494th Bombardment Group, Heavy c. 7 February 1944
Inactivated on 4 January 1946

- Consolidated on 31 January 1984 with the 494th Bombardment Wing as 494th Bombardment Wing

494th Bombardment Wing

- Constituted as 494th Bombardment Wing, Heavy' on 15 November 1962 and activated (not organized)

Organized on 1 February 1963
Discontinued and inactivated on 2 April 1966

- Consolidated on 31 January 1984 with the 494th Bombardment Group
- Redesignated 494th Air Expeditionary Group and converted to provisional status on 12 June 2002 Listed as active in Air Force documents at least from July to October 2003.

=== Assignments ===
- Second Air Force, 1 December 1943
- Seventh Air Force, ca. 15 June 1944 (under operational control of Combined Task Group 95.6, 3 November – 12 December 1944; Fifth Air Force – 14 December 1944; V Bomber Command – 27 January 1945; Thirteenth Air Force – 19 March 1945; XIII Bomber Command – 27 March 1945; Thirteenth Air Force – 14 April 1945)
- Strategic Air Command, 15 November 1962 (not organized)
- 816th Strategic Aerospace Division, 1 February 1963
- 4th Air Division, 1 July 1963
- 816th Strategic Aerospace Division, 1 July 1964
- 819th Strategic Aerospace Division, 1 July 1965
- 19th Air Division, 1 October 1965 – 2 April 1966
- Air Mobility Command to activate or inactivate after 12 June 2002

=== Components ===
Operational Squadrons

- 373d Bombardment Squadron: 21 July – 15 December 1945
- 864th Bombardment Squadron: 1 December 1943 – 4 January 1946; 1 February 1963 – 2 April 1966
- 865th Bombardment Squadron: 1 December 1943 – 4 January 1946
- 866th Bombardment Squadron: 1 December 1943 – 4 January 1946
- 867th Bombardment Squadron: 1 December 1943 – 4 January 1946
- 900th Air Refueling Squadron: 1 February 1963 – 2 April 1966

Support Squadrons

- 61st Munitions Maintenance Squadron: 1 February 1963 – 2 April 1966
- 494th Armament & Electronics Maintenance Squadron: 1 February 1963 – 2 April 1966
- 494th Combat Defense Squadron: 1 February 1963 – 2 April 1966
- 494th Field Maintenance Squadron: 1 February 1963 – 2 April 1966
- 494th Organizational Maintenance Squadron: 1 February 1963 – 2 April 1966

=== Stations ===
- Wendover Field, Utah, 1 December 1943 – 15 April 1944
- Mountain Home Army Air Field, Idaho, 15 April 1944 – 2 June 1944
- Barking Sands Army Air Field, Hawaii Territory, 15 June 1944 – 30 September 1944
- Angaur Airstrip, Palau Islands, 30 September 1944 – 24 June 1945
- Yontan Airfield, Okinawa, 24 June 1945 – 8 December 1945
- Fort Lawton, Washington, 2–4 January 1946
- Sheppard Air Force Base, Texas, 15 November 1963 – 1 April 1966

=== Aircraft flown ===
- Consolidated B-24 Liberator 1943–1946
- Boeing B-52 Stratofortress 1963–1966
- Boeing KC-135 Stratotanker 1963–1966

== See also ==
- List of B-52 Units of the United States Air Force
