= 866th Bombardment Squadron =

Inactive US Air Force Squadron

866th Bombardment Squadron (later 866th Technical Training Squadron)
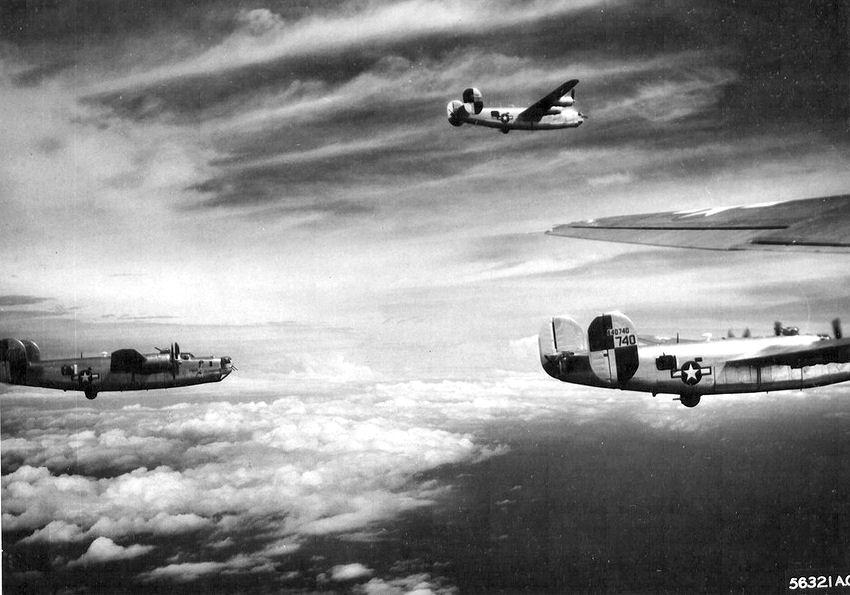
- 494th Bombardment Group B-24 Liberators on their way to a target, 24 February 1945 (Note: Aircraft in foreground is Consolidated B-24J-175-CO Liberator, serial 44-40668, Pious Plunderer.)
- Active: 1943–1946; 1958–1962
- Country: United States
- Branch: United States Air Force
- Role: Intermediate range ballistic missile training
- Engagements: Pacific Theater of Operations
- Decorations: Philippine Presidential Unit Citation

Insignia
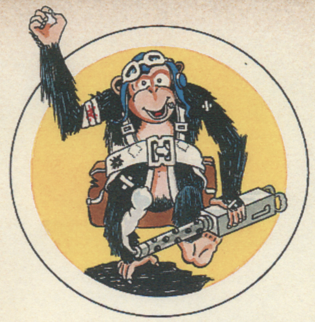
- 866th Bombardment Squadron emblem (Note: Approved 17 May 1945. Description: On a yellow disc, border white, edged black, a caricatured black monkey, affronte, wearing light turquoise blue aviator's helmet, white goggles and parachute straps, and brown parachute pack, having a bandage marked with blood about right forearm holding finger of right hand aloft in "o.k." symbol and grasping with left hand a gray aerial machine gun with smoke issuing from muzzle, all casting a black drop shadow toward base. Maurer reverses the approval dates for the 865th and 866th Bombardment Squadrons.)

The 866th Bombardment Squadron is an inactive United States Air Force unit. Its last assignment was as the 866th Technical Training Squadron with the 1st Missile Division at Redstone Arsenal, Alabama, where it trained for overseas deployment the SM-78 Jupiter. It was inactivated on 25 May 1962.

The squadron was first activated in late 1943 for service during World War II. After training in the United States, it deployed to the Pacific, where it participated in the strategic bombing campaign against Japan. It returned to the United States and was inactivated in 1946. In 1958, it was redesignated the 866th Strategic Missile Squadron and conducted intermediate range ballistic missile training until again inactivating.

== History ==
=== World War II ===
==== Organization and training in the United States ====
The squadron was first activated as the 866th Bombardment Squadron at Wendover Field, Utah on 1 December 1943 as one of the original squadrons of the 494th Bombardment Group, the last heavy bomber group formed by the Army Air Forces. It trained with Consolidated B-24 Liberators at Wendover and at Mountain Home Army Air Field, Idaho. In January and February 1944, a cadre of the squadron trained under simulated combat conditions at Orlando Army Air Base, Florida with the Army Air Forces Tactical Center, with aircrews filling out the squadron in March. The air echelon began to receive new B-24Js in May and they began departing for Hawaii on 28 May. The ground echelon began its move to Hawaii on 1 June 1944.

==== Combat in the Pacific ====
The squadron remained at Barking Sands Army Air Field for additional training and modifications to its planes to meet theater standards until late September 1944, when it deployed to Angaur Airstrip in the Palau Islands. The squadron's ground echelon was initially involved with the construction of the base on Angaur. Although some unit aircrews flew combat missions with the 30th Bombardment Group from Saipan, the air echelon only began to arrive on Angaur on 24 October 1944, after the Seabees and Army engineers had prepared the airstrip for heavy bomber operations. The squadron finally conducted its first mission on 3 November, when it attacked Japanese airfields on Yap and Koror. It conducted attacks on Japanese military that had been bypassed as American forces had advanced in the Central Pacific. It also attacked the Philippines, hitting gun emplacements, bivouacs, and storage depots on Corregidor and Caballo Islands at the entrance to Manila Bay. It also attacked radio communications installations and power plants at Japanese bases in the Philippines; and attacked airfields, including Clark Field on Luzon. Early in 1945, the 866th struck ammunition and supply dumps in the Davao Gulf and Illana Bay areas of Mindanao and airfields on the island.

The squadron moved to Okinawa in June 1945. From its base at Yontan Airfield it engaged primarily in attacks against enemy airfields on Kyūshū and around the Inland Sea of Japan until V-J Day. It also struck airfields in China and Korea. The unit also participated in incendiary raids and dropped propaganda leaflets over urban areas of Kyūshū. On a combat mission to sink the last remaining Japanese battleship, the Haruna, moored off Etajima Island near Kure Harbor, Honshu, Japan, two of thirty-three B-24 bombers were brought down by flak over the target. Led by Emil Turek, first the Taloa, piloted by 1st Lt. Joseph Dubinsky, then the Lonesome Lady, piloted by 2nd Lt. Thomas C. Cartwright, were brought down near Hiroshima. Decades of research by Japanese historian Shigeaki Mori revealed that 12 American POWs, including men from Dubinsky's and Cartwright's crews were killed by the blast, fires, and radiation from the atomic bombing of Hiroshima. Cartwright and his tail gunner, William Abel survived and were liberated from Ōmori and Ōfuna prisoner-of-war camps. After the war's end, the 866th transported personnel and supplies from Manila to Tokyo. In December, the squadron returned to the United States, where it was inactivated at the Vancouver Barracks Port of Embarkation on 7 January 1946.

=== Jupiter missile training ===
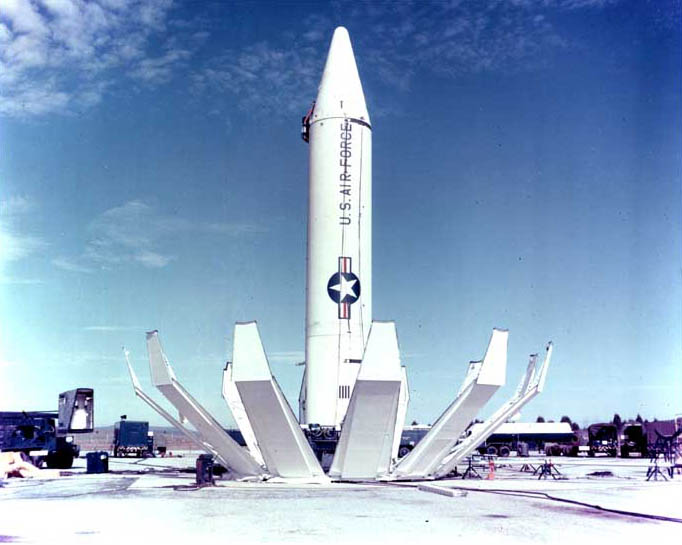
SM-78 Jupiter missile

The squadron was redesignated the 866th Strategic Missile Squadron and activated at Redstone Arsenal, Alabama in September 1958. Because the squadron's mission would be to train on the SM-78 Jupiter missile, it was stationed at the arsenal, which was the location of the Army Ballistic Missile Agency, which had developed the Jupiter, even though the 866th's parent organization, the 1st Missile Division of Strategic Air Command (SAC) was located thousands of miles away at Vandenberg Air Force Base, California. Although the Air Force had been given responsibility for the Jupiter by the Department of Defense. It became clear that it would not operate the missile, and in January 1960, the squadron became the 865th Technical Training Squadron. The squadron was inactivated 25 May 1962, when responsibility for Jupiter missiles was turned over to Turkey. Plans had been developed to establish Jupiter units in the Turkish Air Force, but as a result of the Cuban Missile Crisis, the United States agreed not to deploy Jupiter missiles to Turkey.

== Lineage ==
- Constituted as the 866th Bombardment Squadron (Heavy) on 14 September 1943

Activated on 1 December 1943
Redesignated 866th Bombardment Squadron, Heavy c. 1944
Inactivated on 6 January 1946

- Redesignated 866th Strategic Missile Squadron on 17 June 1958

Activated on 1 September 1958
Redesignated 866th Technical Training Squadron on 1 January 1960
Inactivated on 25 May 1962

=== Assignments ===
- 494th Bombardment Group, 1 December 1943 – 4 January 1946
- 704th Strategic Missile Wing, 1 September 1958 (attached to 1st Missile Division after 1 November 1958)
- 1st Missile Division, 1 July 1959 – 25 May 1962

=== Stations ===
- Wendover Field, Utah, 1 December 1943
- Mountain Home Army Air Field, Idaho, 14 April 1944 – 1 June 1944
- Barking Sands Army Air Field, Hawaii, 15 June 1944
- Angaur Airstrip, Angaur, Palau Islands, 30 September 1944
- Yontan Airfield, Okinawa, 24 June 1945 – 19 December 1945
- Vancouver Barracks, Washington, 4–7 January 1946
- Redstone Arsenal, Alabama, 1 September 1958 – 25 May 1962

=== Aircraft ===
- Consolidated B-24 Liberator, 1944–1945

=== Awards and campaigns ===
Award streamer	Award	Dates	Notes
	Philippine Republic Presidential Unit Citation	17 October 1944 – 4 July 1945	866th Bombardment Squadron

Campaign Streamer	Campaign	Dates	Notes
	Air Offensive, Japan	30 September 1944 – 2 September 1945	866th Bombardment Squadron
	Eastern Mandates	30 September 1944 – 14 April 1944	866th Bombardment Squadron
	Air Combat, Asiatic–Pacific Theater	30 September 1944 – 2 March 1946	866th Bombardment Squadron
	Leyte	17 October 1944 – 1 July 1945	866th Bombardment Squadron
	Luzon	15 December 1944 – 4 July 1945	866th Bombardment Squadron
	Southern Philippines	27 February 1945 – 4 July 1945	866th Bombardment Squadron
	Western Pacific	17 April 1945 – 2 September 1945	866th Bombardment Squadron
	Ryukus	24 June 1945 – 2 July 1945	866th Bombardment Squadron
	China Offensive	24 June 1945 – 2 September 1945	866th Bombardment Squadron
