= 864th Bombardment Squadron =

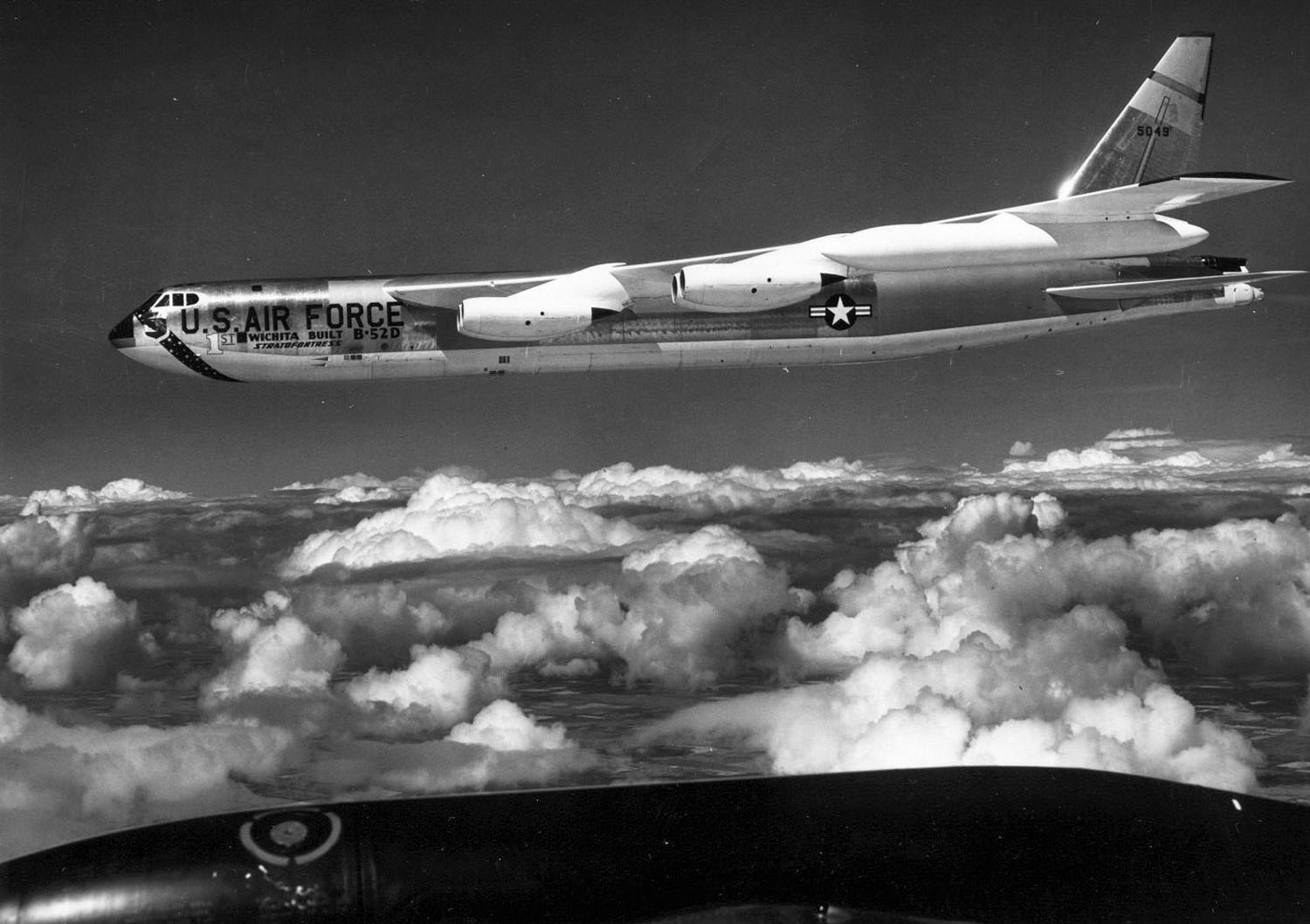
- B-52 stratofortress as flown by the squadron
- Active: 1943–1946; 1958–1960; 1963–1966
- Country: United States
- Branch: United States Air Force
- Role: Heavy bomber
- Mottos: Optimus Maximus (Latin for 'The Best and Greatest') (1958–1960)
- Engagements: Pacific Theater of Operations
- Decorations: Philippine Presidential Unit Citation

Insignia
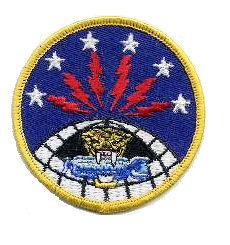
- 864th Bombardment Squadron emblem (SAC era)

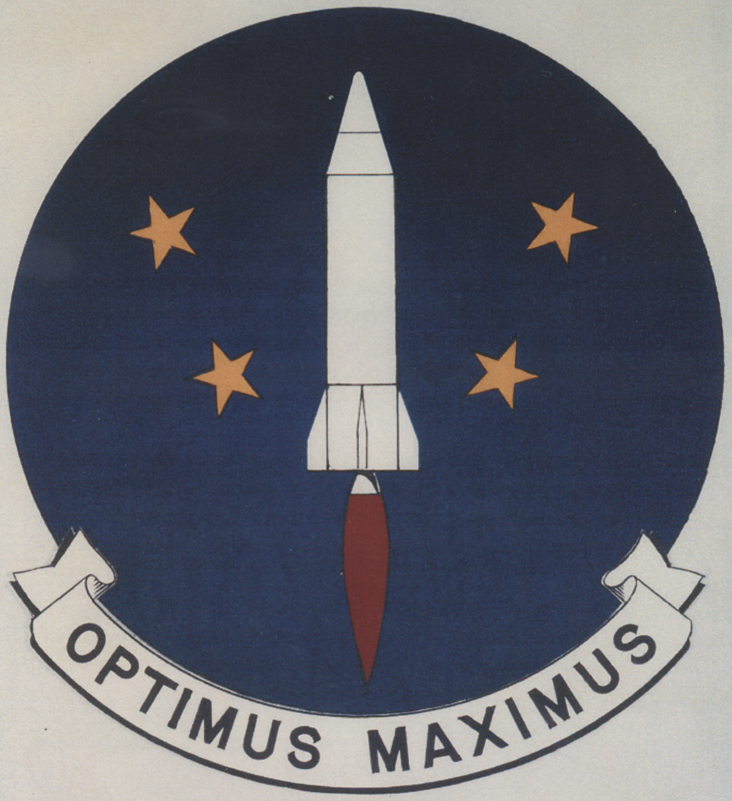
- 864th Strategic Missile Squadron emblem (Note: Approved 7 November 1958. Description: On an Air Force blue disc, a white missile pointing upward, trailing red exhaust to base, between four Air Force golden yellow stars forming a "V" pattern, two in dexter, and two in sinister, outlines and details black throughout.)

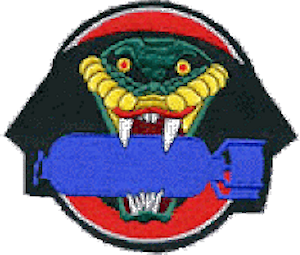
- 864th Bombardment Squadron emblem (World War II)

The 864th Bombardment Squadron is an inactive United States Air Force unit. Its last assignment was with the 494th Bombardment Wing at Sheppard Air Force Base, Texas, where it flew Boeing B-52 Stratofortresses under Strategic Air Command. It was inactivated on 2 April 1966.

The squadron was first activated in late 1943 for service during World War II. After training in the United States, it deployed to the Pacific, where it participated in the strategic bombing campaign against Japan. It returned to the United States and was inactivated in 1946. In 1958, it was redesignated the 864th Strategic Missile Squadron and conducted training on the SM-78 Jupiter missile until again inactivating in 1960. In 1963, it returned to its original designation and was activated at Sheppard.

== History ==
=== World War II ===
==== Organization and training in the United States ====
The 864th Bombardment Squadron was first activated at Wendover Field, Utah on 1 December 1943 as one of the original squadrons of the 494th Bombardment Group, the last heavy bomber group formed by the Army Air Forces. It trained with Consolidated B-24 Liberators at Wendover and at Mountain Home Army Air Field, Idaho. In January and February 1944, a cadre of the squadron trained under simulated combat conditions at Orlando Army Air Base, Florida with the Army Air Forces Tactical Center, with aircrews filling out the squadron in March. The air echelon began to receive new B-24Js in May and they began departing for Hawaii on 28 May. The ground echelon began its move to Hawaii on 1 June 1944.

==== Combat in the Pacific ====
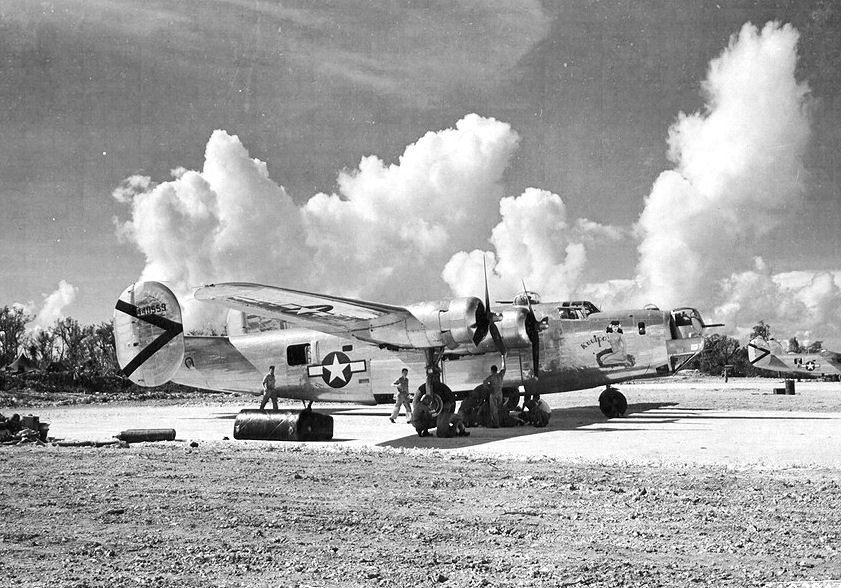
B-24J Liberator 44-40559 "Kuuipo" (Note: Aircraft is Consolidated B-24J-170-CO Liberator, serial 44-40559 "Kuuipo". Kuuipo means 'sweetheart' in Hawaiian. This aircraft was a veteran of 45 combat missions when she was badly shot up by Japanese fighters on a 25 July 1945 mission to bomb Tsuiki, Kyushu. Only two of the crew members survived. Missing Air Crew Report 14899.)

The squadron remained at Barking Sands Army Air Field for additional training and modifications to its planes to meet theater standards until late September 1944, when it deployed to Angaur Airstrip in the Palau Islands. The squadron ground echelon was initially involved with the construction of the base on Angaur. Although some unit aircrews flew combat missions with the 30th Bombardment Group from Saipan, the air echelon only began to arrive on Angaur on 24 October 1944, after the Seabees and Army engineers had prepared the airstrip for heavy bomber operations. The squadron finally conducted its first mission on 3 November, when it attacked Japanese airfields on Yap and Koror. It conducted attacks on Japanese military that had been bypassed as American forces had advanced in the Central Pacific. It also attacked the Philippines, hitting gun emplacements, bivouacs, and storage depots on Corregidor and Caballo Islands at the entrance to Manila Bay. It also attacked radio communications installations and power plants at Japanese bases in the Philippines; and attacked airfields, including Clark Field on Luzon. Early in 1945, the 864th struck ammunition and supply dumps in the Davao Gulf and Illana Bay areas of Mindanao and airfields on the island.

The squadron moved to Okinawa in June 1945. From its base at Yontan Airfield it engaged primarily in attacks against enemy airfields on Kyūshū and around the Inland Sea of Japan until V-J Day. It also struck airfields in China and Korea. The unit also participated in incendiary raids and dropped propaganda leaflets over urban areas of Kyūshū. After the war's end, the unit transporting personnel and supplies from Manila to Tokyo. In December, the squadron returned to the United States, where it was inactivated at the Vancouver Barracks Port of Embarkation on 6 January 1946.

=== Jupiter missile training ===
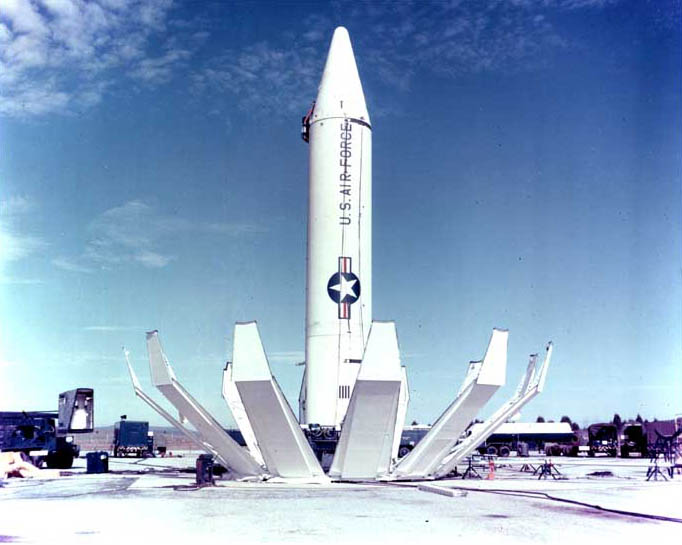
SM-78 Jupiter missile

The squadron was redesignated the 864th Strategic Missile Squadron and activated at Redstone Arsenal, Alabama in January 1958. This was the first of three SM-78 Jupiter missile squadrons Strategic Air Command (SAC) would activate at the Redstone Arsenal. Because the squadron's mission would be to conduct training of Italian Air Force personnel on the Jupiter missile, it was stationed at the arsenal, which was the location of the Army Ballistic Missile Agency, which had developed the Jupiter, even though the 864th's parent organization, the 1st Missile Division was located thousands of miles away at Vandenberg Air Force Base, California. The first Jupiter for training was delivered in August. Although the Air Force had been given responsibility for the Jupiter by the Department of Defense. it became clear that it would not operate the missile, and in April 1959, the squadron became the 864th Technical Training Squadron. That same month a plan was developed to establish a Jupiter unit in the Italian Air Force, which was to become the 36th Strategic Interdiction Air Brigade. The 864th trained Italian Air Force personnel in the operation and launching of the Jupiter until it was inactivated on 1 June 1960 as the Italians assumed responsibility for their own missiles.

=== Strategic Air Command bomber operations ===
As part of its program to disperse its Boeing B-52 Stratofortress bombers over a larger number of bases, thus making it more difficult for the Soviet Union to knock out the entire fleet with a surprise first strike, SAC had established the 4245th Strategic Wing at Sheppard Air Force Base, Texas. In February 1963, the 494th Bombardment Wing assumed the aircraft, personnel and equipment of the discontinued 4245th wing. The 4245th was a Major Command controlled (MAJCON) wing, which could not carry a permanent history or lineage, and SAC wanted to replace it with a permanent unit. As part of this reorganization the 864th returned to its original designation as a bombardment squadron and assumed the mission, personnel and equipment of the 717th Bombardment Squadron, which was simultaneously inactivated.

One half of the squadron's aircraft were maintained on fifteen minute alert, fully fueled and ready for combat to reduce vulnerability to a Soviet missile strike. The squadron also trained in strategic bomber operations. In December 1965, a few months after the first B-52Bs started leaving the operational inventory, Robert S. McNamara, Secretary of Defense, directed a phaseout program that would further reduce SAC's bomber force. This program called for the retirement of all B-52Cs, and of several subsequent B-52 models. In this drawdown, the squadron was inactivated on 2 April 1966.

== Lineage ==
- Constituted as the 864th Bombardment Squadron, Heavy on 14 September 1943

Activated on 1 December 1943
Inactivated on 6 January 1946

- Redesignated 864th Strategic Missile Squadron (IRBM-Jupiter) on 7 January 1958

Activated on 15 January 1958
Redesignated 864th Technical Training Squadron on 15 April 1959
Discontinued on 1 June 1960

- Redesignated 864th Bombardment Squadron, Heavy on 15 November 1962

Organized on 1 February 1963
Inactivated on 2 April 1966

=== Assignments ===
- 494th Bombardment Group, 1 December 1943 – 4 January 1946
- 1st Missile Division, 15 January 1958
- 704th Strategic Missile Wing, 23 February 1958 (attached to 1st Missile Division after 1 November 1958)
- 1st Missile Division, 1 July 1959
- Department of the Air Force, 1 June 1960 (not organized)
- Strategic Air Command, 15 November 1962 (not organized)
- 494th Bombardment Wing, 1 February 1963 – 2 April 1966

=== Stations ===
- Wendover Field, Utah, 1 December 1943
- Mountain Home Army Air Field, Idaho, 14 April 1944 – 1 June 1944
- Barking Sands Army Air Field, Hawaii, 15 June 1944
- Angaur Airstrip, Angaur, Palau Islands, 30 September 1944
- Yontan Airfield, Okinawa, 24 June 1945 – 13 December 1945
- Vancouver Barracks, Washington, 3–6 January 1946
- Redstone Arsenal. Alabama, 15 January 1958 – 1 June 1960
- Sheppard Air Force Base, Texas, 1 February 1963 – 1 April 1966

=== Aircraft ===
- Consolidated B-24 Liberator, 1944–1945
- Boeing B-52 Stratofortress, 1963–1966

=== Awards and campaigns ===
Award streamer	Award	Dates	Notes
	Philippine Republic Presidential Unit Citation	17 October 1944 – 4 July 1945	864th Bombardment Squadron

Campaign Streamer	Campaign	Dates	Notes
	Air Offensive, Japan	30 September 1944 – 2 September 1945	864th Bombardment Squadron
	Eastern Mandates	30 September 1944 – 14 April 1944	864th Bombardment Squadron
	Air Combat, Asiatic–Pacific Theater	30 September 1944 – 2 March 1946	864th Bombardment Squadron
	Leyte	17 October 1944 – 1 July 1945	864th Bombardment Squadron
	Luzon	15 December 1944 – 4 July 1945	864th Bombardment Squadron
	Southern Philippines	27 February 1945 – 4 July 1945	864th Bombardment Squadron
	Western Pacific	17 April 1945 – 2 September 1945	864th Bombardment Squadron
	Ryukus	24 June 1945 – 2 July 1945	864th Bombardment Squadron
	China Offensive	24 June 1945 – 2 September 1945	864th Bombardment Squadron

== See also ==
- B-24 Liberator units of the United States Army Air Forces
- List of B-52 Units of the United States Air Force
- List of United States Air Force missile squadrons
