= 404th Air Expeditionary Group =

United States Air Force military unit

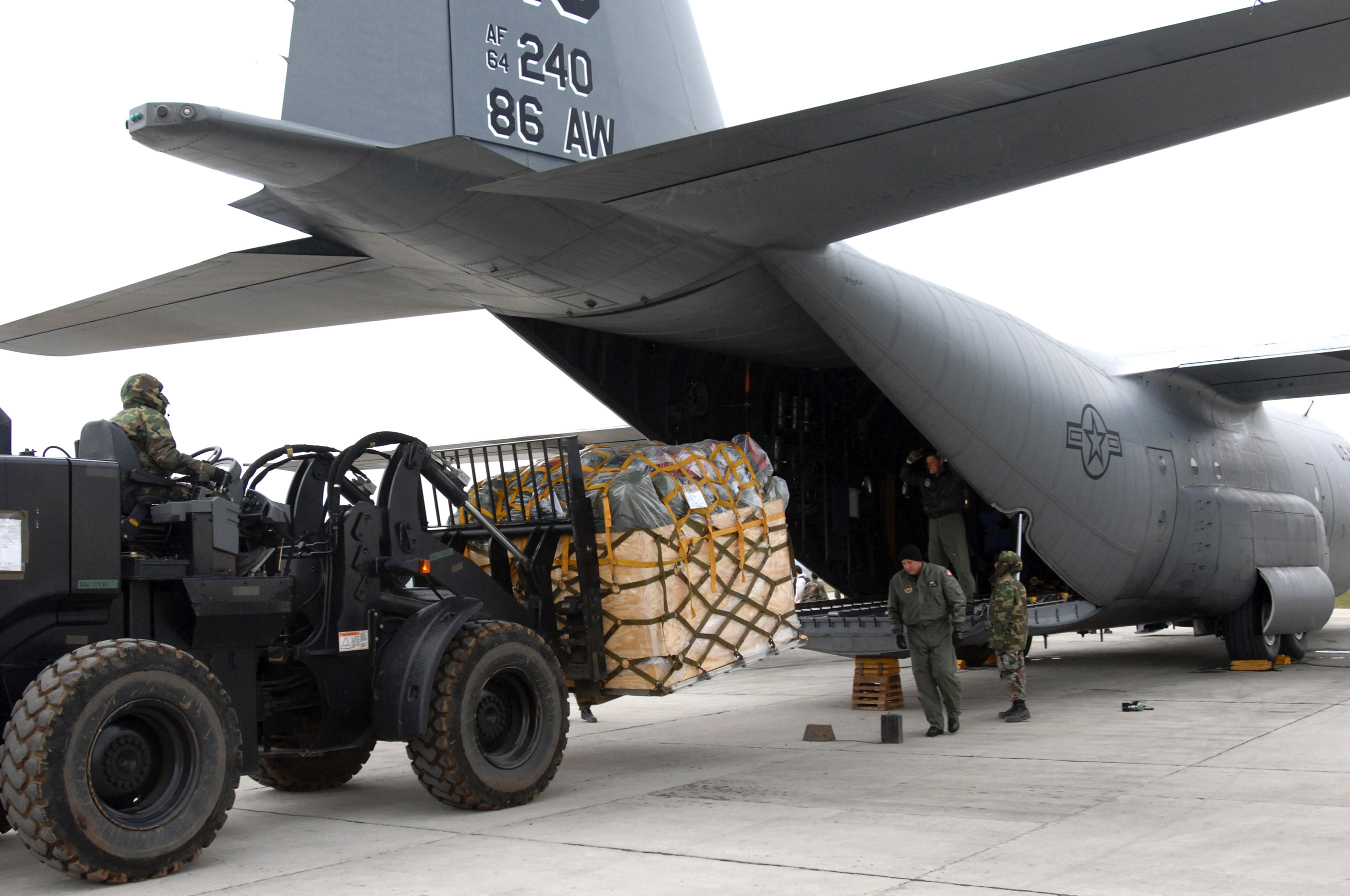
- Members of the 404th offload a C-130 Hercules at Câmpia Turzii Air Base, Romania
- Active: 1943–1945; 1955–1957; 1958–1959; 2003; 2005; 2007; 2008–unknown
- Country: United States
- Branch: United States Air Force
- Role: Air Expeditionary Support
- Part of: United States Air Forces in Europe
- Garrison/HQ: Ramstein AB, Germany
- Motto: Leadership-Knowledge-Dynamic Application (1958-1959)
- Decorations: Air Force Outstanding Unit Award

Commanders
- Current commander: Colonel Phillip S. Fallin

Insignia
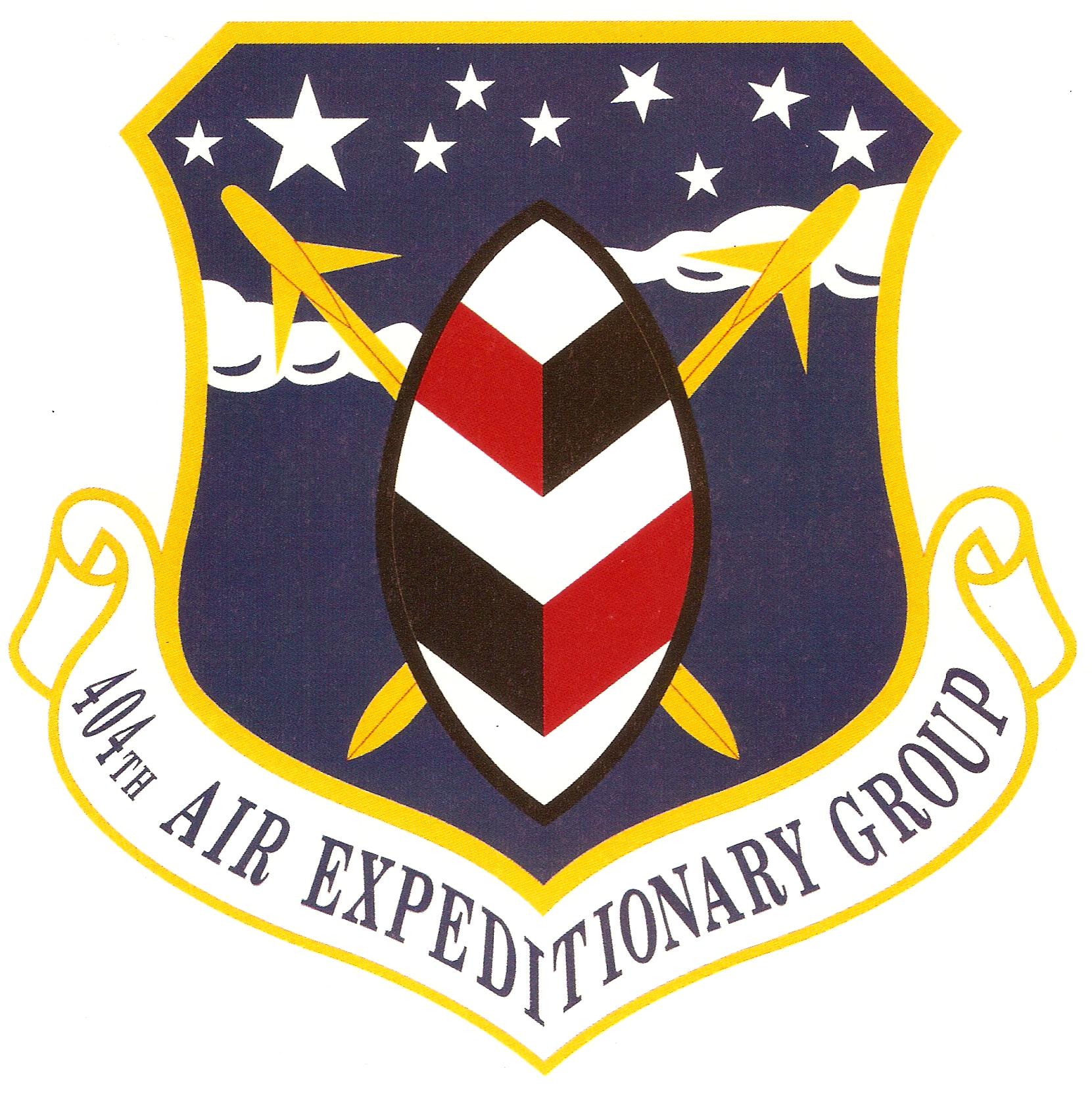
- 404th Air Expeditionary Group emblem

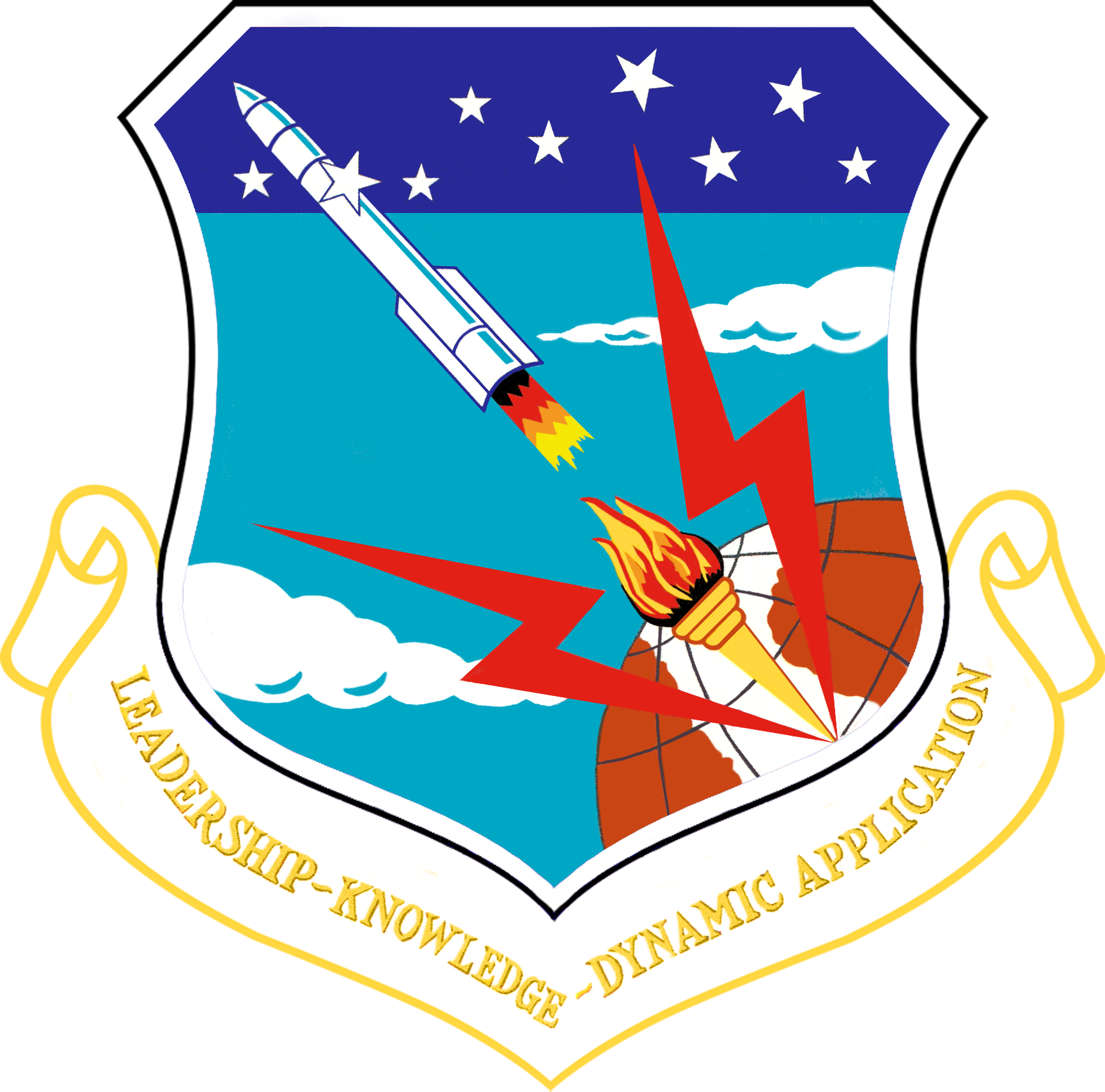
- 704th Strategic Missile Wing emblem (Note: Approved 26 January 1958. Description: Per fess enhanced azure and light blue, the chief strewn with stars argent, between two clouds issuant one from sinister chief the other from dexter base of the last [color mentioned] and issuant bendwise from sinister base a demi-sphere with grid lines of the first [color mentioned], land masses brown and seas of the third [color mentioned] with overall a torch or enflamed proper between two lightning flashes radiant from its base gules, in bend a missile enflamed of the fifth [color mentioned] and surmounted in chief by a segment of a star overall of the third [color mentioned], all within a diminished bordure of the last [color mentioned].)

The 404th Air Expeditionary Group is a provisional United States Air Force unit assigned to the United States Air Forces in Europe. The group may be activated or inactivated at any time.

It was last activated on 1 October 2008, and provided airlift for US Africa Command (USAFRICOM). The 404 Group added, in provisional status, the 459th Expeditionary Air Medical Squadron.

The group forward-deploys when needed to facilitate air and support operations for varied missions, ranging from humanitarian airlift to presidential support. It deployed to Rwanda in January 2009 to airlift for United Nations African Union Mission in Darfur peacekeeping equipment. In July 2009, the 404th Group deployed to Ghana to provide aerial port and aircraft maintenance teams, along with forward communications, early warning, and air domain safety and security elements for U.S. President Barack Obama's visit.

== History ==
=== World War II ===
Established as the 100th Fighter Wing and organized in England in late 1943. Assigned to the European Theater of Operations (ETO), IX Fighter Command, Ninth Air Force. Began operational missions in April 1944, mission of the Wing was to receive operational orders from Headquarters, IX Fighter Command and direct subordinate groups in attacking enemy targets in Occupied France and the Low Countries in preparation for the Normandy Invasion in June 1944. Targets included bridges, roads, railroads and enemy interceptor aircraft both on the ground as well as in air-to-air combat.

After the D-Day invasion, was reassigned to IX Tactical Air Command and directed to provide ground support for advancing United States First Army forces in France, attacking enemy targets initially in the Cotentin Peninsula, then supported Operation Cobra, the breakout of Normandy and attacked enemy forces in the Falaise-Argentan Gap. Wing headquarters and subordinate units operated primarily from liberated airfields and newly built temporary Advanced Landing Grounds in France, moved into north-central France, its groups attacking enemy targets near Paris then north-west into Belgium and the southern Netherlands. In December 1944/January 1945, engaged enemy targets on the north side of the Battle of the Bulge, then moved eastward into the Northern Rhineland as part of the Western Allied invasion of Germany.

Supported First Army as it crossed the Rhine River at Remagen then moved north to attack ground targets in the Ruhr, providing air support as Allied ground forces encircled enemy forces in the Ruhr Pocket, essentially ending organized enemy resistance in Western Germany. First Army halted its advance at the Elbe River in late April 1945, the wing engaging targets of opportunity in enemy-controlled areas until combat was ended on 5 May 1945.

It remained in Europe for four months after VE Day, as part of United States Air Forces in Europe. It performed occupation duty and the destruction or shipment to the United States of captured enemy combat equipment - Operation Lusty. It was inactivated in Germany in August 1945.

=== From 1957 ===
The 704th Strategic Missile Wing activated on 1 July 1957 at Vandenberg Air Force Base, California, but was not operational until mid-November 1957. While it had two operational squadrons, its task was training on the SM-65 Atlas, PGM-19 Jupiter, and the PGM-17 Thor from November 1957 – April 1959. Not operational 6 April – 1 July 1959. The wing then was redesignated as the 404th Tactical Missile Wing on 31 July 1985.

As an air expeditionary unit, it has been activated and inactivated on several occasions by USAFE from 2003 to 2008. In June–July 2003 it was activated at RAF Mildenhall, UK. It was part of the 323d Air Expeditionary Wing from 14 March – 30 April 2008 at Balotești, Romania, when the 323th Wing served briefly as the USAF headquarters for the 2008 Bucharest summit. During the deployment to Romania, the 404th Group with the 404th Expeditionary Air Base Squadron prepared the airfield of Câmpia Turzii for the F-15 fighters which were to be stationed there.

The wing was attached to Seventeenth Air Force (Air Forces Africa) until 17th AF was disestablished.

The wing was listed in the AF Almanac for 2013.

=== Operations and decorations ===
- Combat Operations: Combat in European Theater of Operations (ETO), 15 April 1944-May 1945.
- Campaigns: Air Offensive, Europe; Normandy; Northern France; Rhineland; Ardennes-Alsace; Central Europe

=== Lineage ===
100th Fighter Wing

- Established as the 100th Fighter Wing on 8 November 1943

Activated on 24 November 1943
Inactivated on 7 November 1945
Disestablished on 15 June 1983

- Reestablished and consolidated with the 704th Strategic Missile Wing on 31 July 1985 as the 404th Tactical Missile Wing

404th Air Expeditionary Group
Established as the 704th Strategic Missile Wing on 20 May 1957
Activated on 1 July 1957
Redesignated 704th Strategic Missile Wing (ICBM) on 1 April 1958
Inactivated on 1 July 1959

- Consolidated with the 100th Fighter Wing and redesignated 404th Tactical Missile Wing on 31 July 1985
- Redesignated: 404th Air Expeditionary Group and converted to provisional status on 24 March 2003

Activated on 16 June 2003
Inactivated on 8 July 2003
Activated on 27 August 2003
Inactivated on 19 September 2003
Activated on 27 May 2005
Inactivated on 22 June 2005
Activated on 28 June 2007
Inactivated on 30 July 2007
Activated on 14 March 2008
Inactivated on 30 April 2008
Activated on 21 August 2008:
Inactivated on 15 September 2008
Activated on 1 October 2008

=== Assignments ===
- Ninth Air Force, 24 November 1943
- IX Fighter Command, 27 November 1943
- IX Air Support Command, 12 December 1943
- IX Fighter Command, 4 January 1944
- IX Air Support Command, 1 February 1944
- IX Fighter Command, 1 March 1944
- XIX Air Support Command (later XIX Tactical Air Command), 15 April 1944 – 28 June 1945 (under the operational control of IX Fighter Command, 15 April – 31 July 1944)
- First Air Force, 6 September – 7 November 1945
- Air Research and Development Command, 1 July 1957 (attached to Air Force Ballistic Missile Division
- 1st Missile Division, 1 August 1957 – 1 July 1959
- United States Air Forces in Europe, for activation or inactivation any time after 24 March 2003

Attached to Third Air Force, 16 June – 8 July 2003
Attached to Sixteenth Air Force, 27 August – 19 September 2003
Attached to Sixteenth Air Force, 27 May – 22 June 2005
Attached to Third Air Force (Air Forces Europe), 28 June – 30 July 2007
323d Air Expeditionary Wing (attached to 16th Air Expeditionary Task Force, 14 March – 30 April 2008
Attached to 48th Fighter Wing, 21 August – 15 September 2008
Attached to Seventeenth Air Force (Air Forces Africa) 1 October 2008 – present

=== Units ===
==== Groups ====
- 354th Fighter Group: (P-51 Mustang), 27 November – 2 December 1943; 15 April 1944 – 4 July 1945 (under operational control of 70th Fighter Wing, 22 June – 19 August 1944)
- 362d Fighter Group: (P-47 Thunderbolt), 1 August 1944 – August 1945 (attached to XIX Tactical Air Command)
- 363d Fighter Group (later 363d Tactical Reconnaissance Group): (P-38/F-5 Lightning), August–October 1944
- 371st Fighter Group: (P-47 Thunderbolt), 1 August – 29 September 1944 (attached to XIX Tactical Air Command)
- 405th Fighter Group: (P-47 Thunderbolt), 1 October 1944 – 8 February 1945 (attached to XIX Tactical Air Command)
- 406th Fighter Group: (P-47 Thunderbolt), 1 October 1944 – 8 February 1945 (attached to XIX Tactical Air Command)

==== Squadrons ====
- 576th Strategic Missile Squadron: 1 April 1958 – 1 July 1959 (detached after 6 April 1959)
- 644th Strategic Missile Squadron: 15 January – 1 July 1959 (detached after 6 April 1959)
- 672d Strategic Missile Squadron (later 672d Technical Training Squadron): 1 January – 20 May 1958
- 864th Strategic Missile Squadron (later 864th Technical Training Squadron) 23 February 1958 – 1 July 1959 (attached to 1st Missile Division after 1 November 1958)
- 865th Strategic Missile Squadron (later 865th Technical Training Squadron) 1 July 1958 – 1 July 1959 (attached to 1st Missile Division after 1 November 1958)
- 866th Strategic Missile Squadron: 1 September 1958 – 1 July 1959 (attached to 1st Missile Division after 1 November 1958)
- 37th Expeditionary Airlift Squadron: 28 June – 30 July 2007
- 42d Expeditionary Airlift Squadron: 1 October 2008–present
- 336th Expeditionary Air Refueling Squadron: 21 August – 15 September 2008
- 351st Expeditionary Air Refueling Squadron: 21 August – 15 September 2008
- 492d Expeditionary Fighter Squadron: 14 March – 7 April 2008
- 493d Expeditionary Fighter Squadron: 14 March – 7 April 2008

=== Stations ===
- RAF Boxted (AAF-150), England, 24 November 1943
- RAF Greenham Common (AAF-486), England, 6 December 1943
- RAF Ibsley (AAF-347), England, 13 January 1944
- RAF Lashenden (AAF-410), England, c. 15 April – June 1944
- Cricqueville Airfield (A-2), France, 1 July 1944
- Saint-Pierre-Église (A-5), France, 10 July 1944
- Rennes Airfield (A-27), France, 8 August 1944
- Le Mans Airfield (A-35), France, 30 August 1944
- St-Dizier Airfield (A-64), France, 19 September 1944
- Metz Airdrome (Y-34), France, 29 December 1944
- Königstein, Germany, 14 April–August 1945
- Seymour Johnson Field, North Carolina, 6 September – 7 November 1945
- Cooke Air Force Base (later Vandenberg Air Force Base), California, 1 July 1957 – 1 July 1959
- RAF Mildenhall, England, 16 June – 8 July 2003
- Graf Ignatievo Air Base, Bulgaria, 27 August – 19 September 2003
- 31st Tactical Air Base, Krzesiny, Poland, 27 May – 22 June 2005
- Ramstein Air Base, Germany, 28 June – 30 July 2007
- Câmpia Turzii, Romania, 14 March – 30 April 2008
- Keflavik Air Station, Iceland, 21 August – 15 September 2008
- Ramstein Air Base, Germany, 1 October 2008 – present

=== Known aircraft and missiles ===
- Lockheed P-38 Lightning, 1944–1945
- Republic P-47 Thunderbolt, 1944–1945
- North American P-51 Mustang, 1944–1945
- SM-65 Atlas, 1958–1959
- PGM-19 Jupiter, 1958
- PGM-17 Thor, 1958–1959
- HGM-25A Titan I, 1959
- Lockheed C-130 Hercules, 2008–present
