= 865th Bombardment Squadron =

865th Bombardment Squadron (later 865th Technical Training Squadron)
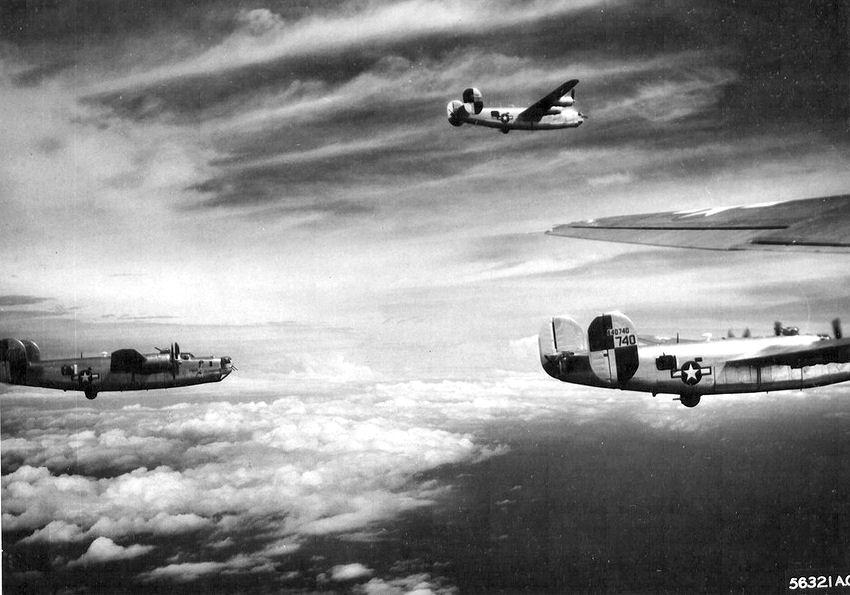
- Squadron B-24 Liberators on their way to a target, 24 February 1945 (Note: Aircraft in foreground is Consolidated B-24J-175-CO Liberator, serial 44-40668, Pious Plunderer.)
- Active: 1943–1946; 1958–1959
- Country: United States
- Branch: United States Air Force
- Role: Intermediate range ballistic missile training
- Engagements: Pacific Theater of Operations
- Decorations: Philippine Presidential Unit Citation

Insignia
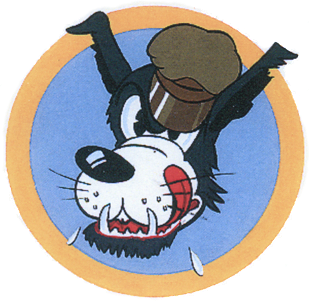
- 865th Bombardment Squadron emblem (Note: Approved 3 May 1945. Description: Over and through a medium blue disc, border golden orange, a caricatured gray wolf's head, trimmed black, mouth and tongue red, wearing an olive drab service cap tilted over the left eye. Maurer reverses the approval dates for the 865th and 866th Bombardment Squadrons.)

The 865th Technical Training Squadron is an inactive United States Air Force unit. Its last assignment was with the 1st Missile Division at Redstone Arsenal. Alabama, where it trained Italian Air Force personnel on the SM-78 Jupiter. It was inactivated on 1 November 1959.

The squadron was first activated in late 1943 as the 865th Bombardment Squadron for service during World War II. After training in the United States, it deployed to the Pacific, where it participated in the strategic bombing campaign against Japan. It returned to the United States and was inactivated in 1946. In 1958, it was redesignated the 865th Strategic Missile Squadron and conducted intermediate range ballistic missile training until again inactivating.

== History ==
=== World War II ===
==== Organization and training in the United States ====
The squadron was first activated as the 865th Bombardment Squadron at Wendover Field, Utah on 1 December 1943 as one of the original squadrons of the 494th Bombardment Group, the last heavy bomber group formed by the Army Air Forces. It trained with Consolidated B-24 Liberators at Wendover and at Mountain Home Army Air Field, Idaho. In January and February 1944, a cadre of the squadron trained under simulated combat conditions at Orlando Army Air Base, Florida with the Army Air Forces Tactical Center, with aircrews filling out the squadron in March. The air echelon began to receive new B-24Js in May and they began departing for Hawaii on 28 May. The ground echelon began its move to Hawaii on 1 June 1944.

==== Combat in the Pacific ====
The squadron remained at Barking Sands Army Air Field for additional training and modifications to its planes to meet theater standards until late September 1944, when it deployed to Angaur Airstrip in the Palau Islands. The squadron's ground echelon was initially involved with the construction of the base on Angaur. Although some unit aircrews flew combat missions with the 30th Bombardment Group from Saipan, the air echelon only began to arrive on Angaur on 24 October 1944, after the Seabees and Army engineers had prepared the airstrip for heavy bomber operations. The squadron finally conducted its first mission on 3 November, when it attacked Japanese airfields on Yap and Koror. Following this, it conducted attacks on Japanese military forces that had been bypassed as American forces had advanced in the Central Pacific. It also attacked the Philippines, hitting gun emplacements, bivouacs, and storage depots on Corregidor and Caballo Islands at the entrance to Manila Bay. Other targets included radio communications installations and power plants at Japanese bases in the Philippines; it also bombed several airfields, including Clark Field on Luzon. Early in 1945, the 865th struck ammunition and supply dumps in the Davao Gulf and Illana Bay areas of Mindanao and airfields on the island.

The squadron moved to Okinawa in June 1945. From its base at Yontan Airfield it engaged primarily in attacks against enemy airfields on Kyūshū and around the Inland Sea of Japan until V-J Day. It also struck airfields in China and Korea. The unit also participated in incendiary raids and dropped propaganda leaflets over urban areas of Kyūshū. After the war's end, the unit transported personnel and supplies from Manila to Tokyo. In December, the squadron returned to the United States, where it was inactivated at the Vancouver Barracks Port of Embarkation on 6 January 1946.

=== Jupiter missile training ===
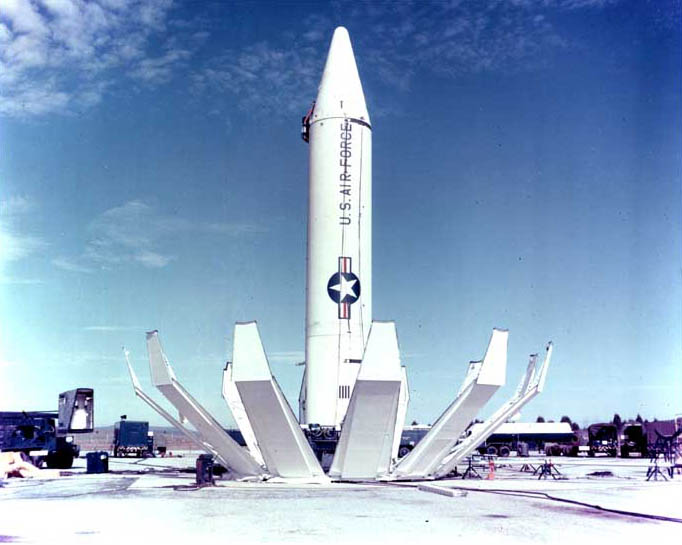
SM-78 Jupiter missile

The squadron was redesignated the 865th Strategic Missile Squadron and activated at Redstone Arsenal, Alabama in June 1958. Because the squadron's mission would be to conduct training on the SM-78 Jupiter missile, it was stationed at the arsenal, which was the location of the Army Ballistic Missile Agency, which had developed the Jupiter, even though the 865th's parent organization, the 1st Missile Division of Strategic Air Command (SAC) was located thousands of miles away at Vandenberg Air Force Base, California. The first Jupiter for training was delivered in August. Although the Air Force had been given responsibility for the Jupiter by the Department of Defense. it became clear that it would not operate the missile, and in May 1959, the squadron became the 865th Technical Training Squadron. The previous month a plan had been developed to establish a Jupiter unit in the Italian Air Force. The squadron trained Italian Air Force personnel in the operation and launching of the Jupiter until it was inactivated 1 November 1959.

== Lineage ==
- Constituted as the 865th Bombardment Squadron (Heavy) on 14 September 1943

Activated on 1 December 1943
Redesignated 865th Bombardment Squadron, Heavy c. 1944
Inactivated on 6 January 1946

- Redesignated 865th Strategic Missile Squadron (IRBM-Jupiter) on 12 March 1958

Activated on 1 June 1958
Redesignated 865th Technical Training Squadron on 25 May 1959
Inactivated on 1 November 1959

=== Assignments ===
- 494th Bombardment Group, 1 December 1943 – 6 January 1946
- 704th Strategic Missile Wing, 1 June 1958 (attached to the 1st Missile Division after 1 November 1958)
- 1st Missile Division, 1 July – 1 November 1959

=== Stations ===
- Wendover Field, Utah, 1 December 1943 – 15 April 1944
- Mountain Home Army Air Field, Idaho, 14 April 1944 – 1 June 1944
- Barking Sands Army Air Field, Hawaii, 15 June 1944
- Angaur Airstrip, Angaur, Palau Islands, 30 September 1944
- Yontan Airfield, Okinawa, 24 June 1945 – 13 December 1945
- Vancouver Barracks, Washington, 3–6 January 1946
- Redstone Arsenal. Alabama, 1 June 1958 – 1 November 1959

=== Aircraft ===
- Consolidated B-24 Liberator, 1944–1945

=== Awards and campaigns ===
Award streamer	Award	Dates	Notes
	Philippine Republic Presidential Unit Citation	17 October 1944 – 4 July 1945	865th Bombardment Squadron

Campaign Streamer	Campaign	Dates	Notes
	Air Offensive, Japan	30 September 1944 – 2 September 1945	865th Bombardment Squadron
	Eastern Mandates	30 September 1944 – 14 April 1944	865th Bombardment Squadron
	Air Combat, Asiatic–Pacific Theater	30 September 1944 – 2 March 1946	865th Bombardment Squadron
	Leyte	17 October 1944 – 1 July 1945	865th Bombardment Squadron
	Luzon	15 December 1944 – 4 July 1945	865th Bombardment Squadron
	Southern Philippines	27 February 1945 – 4 July 1945	865th Bombardment Squadron
	Western Pacific	17 April 1945 – 2 September 1945	865th Bombardment Squadron
	Ryukus	24 June 1945 – 2 July 1945	865th Bombardment Squadron
	China Offensive	24 June 1945 – 2 September 1945	865th Bombardment Squadron

== See also ==
- B-24 Liberator units of the United States Army Air Forces
- List of United States Air Force missile squadrons
