= Adolf Glunz =

German fighter ace, Knight's Cross recipient and race car driver

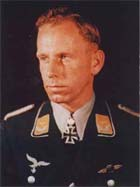
- Glunz as a Leutnant in the Luftwaffe
- Born: 11 June 1916; Bresegard bei Picher
- Died: 1 August 2002 (aged 86); Lüdenscheid
- Military career
- Allegiance: Nazi Germany
- Branch: Luftwaffe
- Service years: 1939–1945
- Rank: Oberleutnant (first lieutenant)
- Units: JG 52, JG 26, EJG 2, JG 7
- Commands: 5./JG 26, 6./JG 26
- Conflicts: See battles World War II: Western Front; Battle of Britain; Operation Donnerkeil; Eastern Front; Defense of the Reich; Schweinfurt-Regensburg mission; second Schweinfurt raid; Operation Bodenplatte
- Awards: Knight's Cross of the Iron Cross with Oak Leaves
- Other work: Auto racing; Driver's education

German Formula Three
- Years active: 1950 – 1951
- Best finish: 8th, German Championship in 1950

Adolf "Addi" Glunz (11 June 1916 – 1 August 2002) was a German Luftwaffe military aviator and fighter ace during World War II. He is credited with 71 aerial victories achieved in 574 combat missions. All but three of his victories were claimed over the Western Front and in Defense of the Reich. This figure included seventeen four-engine bombers and 37 Supermarine Spitfire fighters.

Born in Bresegard, Glunz grew up in the Weimar Republic and Nazi Germany. He joined the military service in the Luftwaffe in 1939 and was trained as a fighter pilot. Following flight training, he was posted to Jagdgeschwader 52 (JG 52—52nd Fighter Wing) in November 1940. Flying with this wing, Glunz claimed his first aerial victory on 7 May 1941 on the Western Front over a Royal Air Force fighter aircraft. In preparation of Operation Barbarossa, JG 52 was moved east where Glunz claimed three Soviet aircraft destroyed. In July 1941, he was assigned to Jagdgeschwader 26 "Schlageter" (JG 26—26th Fighter Wing), operating on the Western Front. On 29 August 1943, Glunz was awarded the Knight's Cross of the Iron Cross, the only non-commissioned officer of JG 26 to receive this distinction. In January 1944, Glunz was appointed squadron leader of 5. Staffel (5th squadron) and in March of 6. Staffel, followed by his promotion to an officer's rank in April. On 24 June 1944, he was awarded the Knight's Cross of the Iron Cross with Oak Leaves. Glunz claimed his last aerial victory on 1 January 1945 during Operation Bodenplatte. In March 1945, he underwent conversion training to the Messerschmitt Me 262 jet fighter. In April, Glunz transferred to Jagdgeschwader 7 (JG 7—7th Fighter Wing), the first jet fighter wing but did not fly the Me 262 operationally.

In May 1945, Glunz was taken prisoner of war and released in June 1946. He then became a Formula Three race car driver before he founded his own business, giving driving lessons. Glunz died on 1 August 2002 in Lüdenscheid.

== Early life and career ==
Glunz was born on 11 June 1918 in Bresegard, district of Ludwigslust, at the time in the Province of Pomerania of the German Empire. He was the son Karl Glunz, a Beamter, or civil servant, of the Deutsche Reichsbahn. Due to his father's job, the family moved to Hamburg and in 1934 to Heide. Following graduation from school, Glunz began vocational education in mechanical engineering. In Heide, he worked for a company which built glider aircraft, triggering his interest in flying. Aged sixteen, he began building and flying glider aircraft. Glunz then became a flight instructor with the National Socialist Flyers Corps 11/16 of the Nord Gruppe (northern group), teaching members of the Hitler Youth to fly.

From 2 November 1938 to 25 March 1939, Glunz attended the compulsory Reichsarbeitsdienst (Reich Labour Service). Glunz joined the military service of the Luftwaffe on 1 September 1939, the day German forces invaded Poland starting World War II in Europe. He served with 2. Kompanie (2nd company) of Flieger-Ausbildungs-Regiment 61 (61st Flight Training Regiment), completing on 30 September. He was then transferred to 1. Staffel (1st squadron) of Jagdfliegerschule 4 (fighter pilot school) in Fürth. After he completed flight training, (Note: Flight training in the Luftwaffe progressed through the levels A1, A2 and B1, B2, referred to as A/B flight training. A training included theoretical and practical training in aerobatics, navigation, long-distance flights and dead-stick landings. The B courses included high-altitude flights, instrument flights, night landings and training to handle the aircraft in difficult situations.) he received the Pilot's Badge (Pilotenabzeichen) on 4 October 1940. He was then posted to the Ergänzungsstaffel (a training unit) of Jagdgeschwader 52 (JG 52—52nd Fighter Wing) on 1 November 1940.

== World War II ==
World War II in Europe began on Friday 1 September 1939 when German forces invaded Poland. On 9 November 1940, Glunz was transferred from the Ergänzungsstaffel to 4. Staffel of JG 52, a squadron of the II. Gruppe (2nd group). At the time, II. Gruppe of JG 51 was undergoing a period of rest and replenishment at Mönchengladbach following the Battle of Britain. There, the Gruppe's strength was brought to 24 Messerschmitt Bf 109 Es, including a few Bf 109 E-8. The Gruppe was commanded by Hauptmann Erich Woitke while 4. Staffel was headed by Oberleutnant Johannes Steinhoff. On 22 December, II. Gruppe was ordered to Leeuwarden Airfield where it was tasked with patrolling the North Sea coast in the Netherlands. Following a brief stay at Haamstede, the Gruppe was moved to Berck-sur-Mer on 10 February 1941.

On 15 April 1941, the Luftwaffe ordered an attack on the Royal Air Force (RAF) airfield at Manston. Due to adverse weather conditions, the attack was called off, only a Schwarm, a flight of four aircraft, under the leadership of Oberleutnant Siegfried Simsch, assumed to have reached the target. The flight however had found the Luftwaffe airfield at Saint-Omer where II. Gruppe of Jagdgeschwader 53 (JG 53—53rd Fighter Wing) was based. In the attack, the Schwarm destroyed nine aircraft, wounding two pilots and five technicians. The pilots Glunz, Simsch, Feldwebel Georg Mayr and Unteroffizier Hans Sembill were punished by Hermann Göring personally.

On 27 April, II. Gruppe was moved again, this time to an airfield at Katwijk where it started receiving the first aircraft of the Bf 109 F series. Glunz was promoted to Unteroffizier (subordinate officer or sergeant) on 1 May. Flying from Katwijk on 7 May, he claimed his first aerial victory when he shot down a RAF Supermarine Spitfire fighter 5 kilometers (3.1 miles) east of Deal. On 19 May, he was credited with another Spitfire destroyed, claimed at 12:40 north of Dover. This earned him the Iron Cross 2nd Class (Eisernes Kreuz 2. Klasse), awarded on 26 May and the Iron Cross 1st Class (Eisernes Kreuz 1. Klasse) on 8 June. On 9 June, II. Gruppe of JG 51 was withdrawn from the Channel Front.

On 13 June, the Stab and 4. Staffel of JG 52 were ordered east to Suwałki, located about 30 km (19 mi) from the southwestern Lithuanian border, while 5. and 6. Staffel were moved to Eastern Prussia. On 22 June, German forces launched Operation Barbarossa, the German invasion of the Soviet Union. At the start of this invasion, II. Gruppe was controlled the Stab of Jagdgeschwader 27 (JG 27—27th Fighter Wing) which was subordinated to VIII. Fliegerkorps (2nd Air Corps) and part of Luftflotte 2 (Air Fleet 2). JG 27 area of operation during Operation Barbarossa was over the northern area of Army Group Center. Glunz claimed his first aerial victory on the Eastern Front in the vicinity of Varėna on 26 June. That day he shot down an Ilyushin DB-3 bomber at 09:33. Glunz received the Front Flying Clasp of the Luftwaffe for fighter pilots in Bronze (Frontflugspange für Jagdflieger in Bronze) on 1 July. Two days later, he claimed two further DB-3 bombers near Barysaw. On 16 July 1941, his Bf 109 F-2 (Werknummer 8175—factory number) suffered engine failure resulting in an emergency landing at Vitebsk.

=== Western Front ===
Glunz joined Jagdgeschwader 26 "Schlageter" (JG 26—26th Fighter Wing) on 18 July 1941 and was assigned to the II. Gruppe. JG 26 was named after Albert Leo Schlageter, a martyr cultivated by the Nazi Party. At the time, II. Gruppe was commanded by Hauptmann Walter Adolph and based at Moorsele Airfield, Belgium near the English Channel. Glunz made his first check flight with this unit on 24 July and flew his first combat mission on 29 July with 4. Staffel. On 6 August, he flew another mission resulting in no claims or losses. On 21 August, the RAF Fighter Command targeted a chemical plant at Chocques with "Circus" No. 83 and Nr. 84. Following combat, Glunz made a forced landing of Bf 109 E-7 at Saint-Omer. On 27 August, the Fighter Command sent "Circus" No. 85 to saint-Omer and Nr. 86 to the power station at Lille. All three Gruppen of JG 26 were dispatched and intercepted "Circus" No. 85. During this encounter, Glunz claimed his first aerial victory with JG 26, his sixth in total, when he shot down a Spitfire fighter near Bergues. On 3 September, 4. Staffel went to Le Bourget for conversion training to the then new Focke-Wulf Fw 190 radial engine powered fighter. That day, Glunz made his maiden flight on the Fw 190 under the guidance of Oberleutnant Karl Borris who was leading the training program. Glunz flew the Bf 109 operationally at least once more. On 8 September, flying a Bf 109 E-7, he participated on a fighter escort mission for two destroyers passing through the Strait of Dover. Later that day, he made another training flight on the Fw 190.

JG 26 emblem

On 18 September, Adolph was killed in action, in consequence command of II. Gruppe was given to Hauptmann Joachim Müncheberg. Glunz received the Front Flying Clasp of the Luftwaffe for fighter pilots in Silver (Frontflugspange für Jagdflieger in Silber) on 1 October. During a landing accident at Moorsele Airfield the following day, he damaged the landing gear of his Fw 190 A-1 (Werknummer 0020). On 5 November, Glunz claimed his first aerial victory flying the Fw 190. A "Rhubarb" flown by No. 611 Squadron was intercepted by Glunz and his wingman off Gravelines. In this encounter, Glunz claimed a Spitfire fighter shot down. His opponent may have been Sergeant William Philip Dales from No. 611 Squadron who was killed in action. On 8 November Fighter Command flew the last "Circus" of the year. "Circus" Nr. 110 targeted the railroad repair facility at Lille. In an air battle which involved Spitfire fighters of Royal Canadian Air Force (RCAF) No. 412 Squadron, based at RAF Wellingore, Glunz was credited with shooting down a Spitfire fighter 15 kilometers (9.3 miles) north of Calais.

His first aerial battle in 1942 occurred on 9 January. Glunz and his wingman, Unteroffizier Josef Siecker, chased two Spitfire fighters from No. 71 Squadron, one of the American Eagle Squadrons in the RAF. In this encounter, Sieker was shot down and killed while one of the Spitfire fighters claimed a probable victory over Glunz. Glunz also claimed one of the Spitfires shot down but both American pilots returned safely. Glunz claimed his tenth aerial victory during Operation Donnerkeil. The objective of this operation was to give the German battleships Scharnhorst and Gneisenau and the heavy cruiser Prinz Eugen fighter protection in the breakout from Brest to Germany. The Channel Dash operation (11–13 February 1942) by the Kriegsmarine was codenamed Operation Cerberus by the Germans. In support of this, the Luftwaffe, formulated an air superiority plan dubbed Operation Donnerkeil for the protection of the three German capital ships. Glunz was credited with a Spitfire from either No. 118 or No. 234 Squadron shot down at 17:08 on 12 February east of Eu.

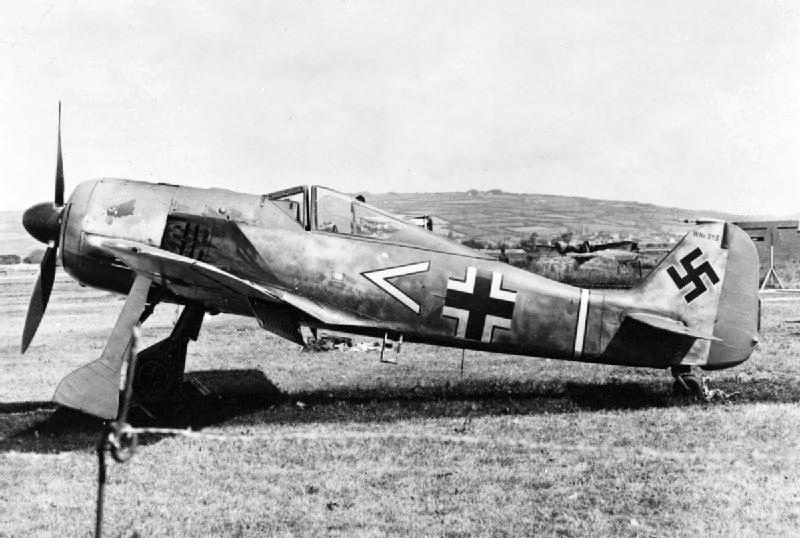
A Focke-Wulf Fw 190 fighter similar to those flown by Glunz.

On 13 March, Glunz attacked a flight of Spitfire fighters from the RCAF No. 401 Squadron over the English Channel, off Dungeness. In this encounter, he claimed one of the Spitfires shot down. On 10 April, the RAF flew two "Rodeos", providing a diversion for a "Ramrod" short range bomber attack missions targeting Boulogne. JG 26 lost three aircraft, including two pilots killed in action, for six aerial victories claimed. Glunz claimed a No. 340 (Free French) Squadron Spitfire shot down at 17:43 near Étaples. On 14 April 1942, Glunz claimed a Spitfire shot down from No. 317 Squadron near Calais. The RAF flew one "Circus" and two "Ramrods" in the area of Pas de Calais. "Circus" Nr. 137 targeted the Luftwaffe the Abbeville Airfield. Defending against this attack, Glunz was credited with shooting down a Spitfire fighter near Abbeville. Glunz was wounded during an aerial attack on the Abbeville Airfield. The attack occurred while he was sitting on the toilet, forcing him to seek cover with lowered trousers. He was then wounded by flying glass fragments in the buttock. Since the injuries were caused by enemy action, he was awarded the Wound Badge in Black (Verwundetenabzeichen in Schwarz) in April 1942. He considered the circumstances of the injury too embarrassing and never wore the decoration.

Seageant George Beurling, a Canadian fighter pilot serving with No. 41 Squadron, may have been credited with shooting down Glunz on 1 May. Gun camera footage revealed two hits on a Fw 190 and Beurling was credited with his first aerial victory although Glunz returned safely. On 17 May, he shot down a No. 602 Squadron Spitfire near Ardres. The Spitfire was escorting bombers of "Ramrod" No. 33 to the Boulogne dock. On 5 June, Fighter Command sent a two phased "Circus" mission, one to Ostend and another to Le Havre. That day, Glunz shot down a Spitfire fighter west-northwest of Ault. The Spitfire belonged to either No. 133 or RCAF No. 401 Squadron. Three days later, "Circus" No. 191 was sent to Bruges and Glunz was credited with a Spitfire destroyed west-northwest of Dunkirk. The Spitfire belonged to either the Hornchurch or Kenley Wings. On 28 June, Glunz was tasked with an evening aerial reconnaissance to England. His flight was intercepted near Beachy Head by two Spitfires from No. 611 Squadron. In this encounter, Glunz shot down one of the Spitfires near Hastings. For his eighteen aerial victories claimed, Glunz was awarded the Honor Goblet of the Luftwaffe (Ehrenpokal der Luftwaffe) on 29 June.

On 22 July, command of II. Gruppe was transferred from Müncheberg to Hauptmann Karl-Heinz Meyer, also known as Conny Meyer. Glunz claimed two further Spitfires shot down west of Berck-sur-Mer on 31 July, taking his total to 20 aerial victories claimed. His opponents were fighters from either the American No. 121 or the Norwegian No. 332 Squadron. During the Dieppe Raid on 19 August, on II. Gruppe's third combat air patrol of the day, at 10:28, Glunz was credited with the destruction of a Spitfire west of Dieppe. Glunz also participated on II. Gruppe's fifth and sixth mission of the day. The objective was fighter escort for Dornier Do 217 and providing close air support for German forces. Glunz received the Front Flying Clasp of the Luftwaffe for fighter pilots in Gold (Frontflugspange für Jagdflieger in Gold) on 25 August.

=== Defense of the Reich ===
The United States Army Air Forces (USAAF) VIII Bomber Command, later renamed to Eighth Air Force, had begun its regular combat operations on 17 August 1942. On 5 September, VIII Bomber Command targeted the Port of Le Havre and the Sotteville-lès-Rouen railroad yards, escorted by RAF Spitfire fighters from No. 64 and No. 340 (Free French) Squadron. At 11:41, Glunz claimed one of the six Spitfires shot down by JG 26 that day. For 22 aerial victories claimed, Glunz was awarded the German Cross in Gold (Deutsches Kreuz in Gold) on 1 November 1942. (Note: According to Patzwall and Schumann on 15 October 1942.) The following day, Glunz claimed his 23rd aerial victory and last in 1942 over a No. 91 Squadron Spitfire west of Berck-sur-Mer. On 20 December, VIII Bomber Command sent 101 Boeing B-17 Flying Fortress and Consolidated B-24 Liberator bombers to Lille. In the attack on the bombers, Glunz's Fw 190 was hit by the bombers defense gunfire. Although his aircraft was damaged, he returned to his airfield at Beaumont-le-Roger.

Glunz was promoted to Oberfeldwebel (master sergeant) on 1 January 1943. The following day, Wilhelm-Ferdinand Galland was appointed Gruppenkommandeur (group commander) of II. Gruppe of JG 26 by his brother General der Jagdflieger (General of the Fighter Arm) Adolf Galland. General Galland had been unhappy for some time about the JG 26's lack of success against the USAAF strategic aerial bombardment campaign in Defense of the Reich. In consequence, the former Gruppenkommandeur Meyer was transferred to a training unit and Wilhelm-Ferdinand appointed his successor. Glunz flew another aerial reconnaissance mission on 19 January, patrolling the English coast from Hastings to Dover. He flew a reconnaissance mission to England on 19 January 1943, patrolling the English coast from Hastings to Dover without encountering any opposition. On 3 February, the RAF flew "Circus" missions No. 259, attacking the Saint-Omer railroad yard. The attacking Lockheed Ventura medium bombers were escorted by Spitfires from the RCAF No. 416 Squadron. In this encounter, Glunz claimed a Spitfire shot down at 15:30 which was not confirmed. The next day, he was sent on another aerial reconnaissance mission. On 17 February, Glunz faced Spitfires from No. 124 Squadron, resulting in another victory over a Spitfire near Ardres. On 26 February, the RAF attacked a German ship moored at Dunkirk. In its defense, Glunz shot down a No. 122 Squadron Spitfire west of Saint-Omer, his 25th aerial victory.

Combat box of a 12-plane B-17 squadron. Three such boxes completed a 36-plane group box.: 1. Lead Element; 2. High Element; 3. Low Element; 4. Low Low Element

VIII Bomber Command sent 54 B-17 bombers to Rennes and 16 B-24 bombers to the railroad yards at Rouen on 8 March. Glunz shot down one of the escorting Spitfire fighters from No. 340 (Free French) Squadron near Rouen. The RAF No. 2 Group had been complemented with two squadrons of de Havilland Mosquito combat aircraft. On the evening of 28 March 1943, six Mosquitos were spotted heading towards Dunkirk. Glunz's Schwarm scrambled from Vitry airfield to defend the airfield. The flight succeeded in intercepting the Mosquitos and Glunz shot down two No. 105 Squadron Mosquitos south of Lille. On 3 April, the Kenley Wing led by Wing Commander Johnnie Johnson bounced II. Gruppe as they were climbing from the Vitry-en-Artois Airfield. The Canadians were credited with six aerial victories in this attack. Glunz was the only German pilot to claim an aerial victory when he shot down a RCAF No. 416 Squadron Spitfire near Le Touquet. The following day, the Allies hit the Renault automobile factory at Île Seguin near Paris. II. Gruppe intercepted the formation on their return to England near Beauvais. Southwest of Dieppe, Glunz claimed an escorting Spitfire from either No. 315, No. 316 or No. 403 Squadron shot down.

Glunz claimed his first heavy bomber on 5 April. That day, the USAAF sent 104 B-17 and B-24 bombers to the Erla aircraft factory at Antwerp with 82 bombers hitting the target area. II. Gruppe intercepted the bombers of the 306th Bombardment Group shortly after the bombers had dropped their bombs. In a head-on attack, Glunz claimed a B-17 at 15:38 north of the Scheldt Estuary. This claim in the vicinity of Dinteloord was in fact an Herausschuss (separation shot)—a severely damaged heavy bomber forced to separate from its combat box which was counted as an aerial victory. The RAF flew four "Rodeos" over Pas de Calais on 11 June. On the second mission of day, Glunz claimed a No. 611 Squadron Spitfire north of Doullens. On 16 June, four No. 91 Squadron Spitfires on a search and rescue mission were intercepted over the English Channel. In this encounter, Glunz claimed one of the Spitfires shot down 20 kilometers (12 miles) northwest of Cap Gris-Nez.

On 20 June, Glunz claimed a No. 403 Squadron Spitfire northeast of Étaples. Two days later, VIII Bomber Command flew its first mission to the Ruhr. Near Kats, north of Zuid-Beveland, a 381st Bombardment Group B-17 was shot down by Glunz. The VIII Bomber Command attacked Villacoublay while the RAF targeted Abbeville-Drucat on 26 June. II. Gruppe bounced the escorting Republic P-47 Thunderbolt fighters from direction of the sun. In this melee, Glunz claimed two 56th Fighter Group P-47 fighters shot down northwest of Neufchâtel, only one of which was confirmed. In the late afternoon on 4 July, RAF North American B-25 Mitchell bombers attacked Amiens. To counter this attack, Jagdfliegerführer 2, among other units, dispatched II. Gruppe of JG 26. The Gruppe claimed four aerial victories over the escorting fighters, including a Spitfire by Glunz which was not confirmed, for the loss of one pilot killed in action.

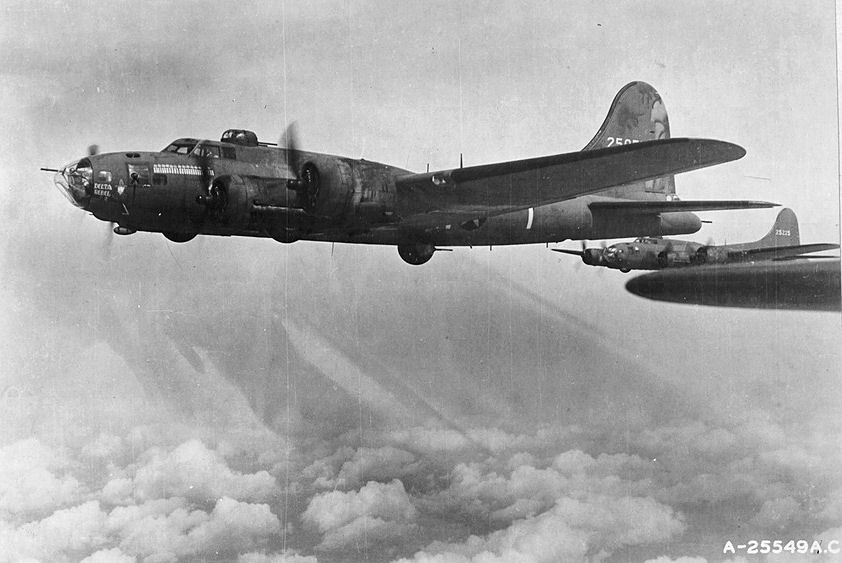
"Delta Rebel No. 2" B-17F from 323rd BS, damaged by Johannes Naumann, then shot down by Glunz on 12 August 1943.

On 12 August, VIII Bomber Command send 330 B-17 bombers against the Ruhr and Rheine area. Defending against this attack, Glunz claimed a B-17 shot down at 09:05 near Hagen and a second B-17 at 09:28 west of Mönchengladbach. During the Schweinfurt-Regensburg mission on 17 August 1943, Glunz shot down a B-17 bomber of the 305th Bombardment Group northwest of Schouwen, crashing at Averbode. That day, Gruppenkommandeur Galland was killed in action. Galland was temporarily succeeded by Hauptmann Johannes Naumann until Oberstleutnant Johannes Seifert took command on II. Gruppe on 9 September. Two days later, Glunz claimed a Martin B-26 Marauder bomber from the 323d Bombardment Group (Medium) shot down over northern France. The claim was not confirmed.

On 29 August, Glunz received the Knight's Cross of the Iron Cross (Ritterkreuz des Eisernen Kreuzes), the only non-commissioned pilot of JG 26 to receive this distinction. On 31 August, VIII Bomber Command targeted the airfields of Luftflotte 3 (Air Fleet 3). Defending against this attack, Glunz shot down a B-17 from the 303rd Bombardment Group near Le Tréport. He then went on home leave in September. On 1 October, as part of the group expansion from three Staffeln per Gruppe to four Staffeln per Gruppe, Glunz's 4. Staffel under the command of Leutnant Helmut Hoppe was renamed to 5. Staffel. Two days later, he claimed an aerial victory over Spitfire which belonged to either No. 341 or No. 485 Squadron. The claim was not confirmed. A week later on 10 October, he shot down a 100th Bombardment Group (Heavy) B-17 bomber north of Deelen. The bomber was on a mission to bomb Münster. On 14 October, during the second Schweinfurt raid also called "Black Thursday", Glunz claimed an unconfirmed aerial victory over an escorting P-47 of the 353rd Fighter Group near Budel.

VIII Bomber Command again sent its bombers to Münster on 11 November. II. Gruppe encountered unescorted B-17 bombers of the 94th Bombardment Group (Heavy) near Dordrecht in the Netherlands. Glunz claimed two B-17 bombers shot down, only one was later confirmed. On 26 November, the USAAF sent 633 bombers of VIII Bomber Command to targets at Bremen and Paris. Defending against this attack, Glunz shot down an escorting P-47 fighter from the 78th Fighter Group near Chantilly. That day, II. Gruppe lost its Gruppenkommandeur when Seifert was killed in action. He was replaced by Hauptmann Wilhelm Gäth. On 1 December, Hoppe, the commanding officer of 5. Staffel, was also killed in action. In consequence, Hauptmann Johann Aistleitner was given command of the Staffel. That day, Glunz claimed two No. 411 Squadron Spitfires shot down southwest of Arras. The USAAF Ninth Air Force and the RAF Second Tactical Air Force attacked various targets in France on 21 December. Glunz claimed a Spitfire shot down near Vimy Ridge, southwest of Douai. The Spitfire belonged to either No. 132 or No. 602 Squadron. On New Year's Eve 1943, USAAF bombers headed for various factories in the Paris area as well as sending bombers to the lower Atlantic French coast. Intercepting the bombers heading for the lower French coast, Glunz claimed the destruction of a B-17 near Lorient.

=== Squadron leader ===
The USAAF 8th Air Force bombed the IG Farben chemical plant at Ludwigshafen on 7 January 1944. That day, Glunz claimed an aerial victory over a 4th Fighter Group P-47 near Boulogne. On 14 January, the Staffelkapitän (squadron leader) of 5. Staffel, Aistleitner, was killed in action. In consequence, Glunz was appointed his successor and was made a Staffelführer, the first non-commissioned officer of JG 26 to hold such a position. On 11 February, VIII Bomber Command sent bombers to Paris and to Frankfurt in an attempt to split German defenses. Defending against this attack, Glunz shot down 351st Bombardment Group B-17 northwest of Poix. On 21 February, the USAAF attacked a number of airfields in western Germany. Intercepting the returning bombers, Glunz claimed a 95th Bombardment Group B-17 shot down west of Bergen aan Zee.

On 22 February, the Eighth Air Force and Fifteenth Air Force dispatched 1,396 bombers, escorted by 965 fighter aircraft, to various Luftwaffe airfields and the German aircraft industry. The attack force had already come under attack by other Luftwaffe units, dispersing the fighter protection, when II. Gruppe intercepted the formation. At 12:50, Glunz claimed his first B-17 shot down that day west of Dorsten. The bomber may have belonged to the 91st or 384th Bombardment Group. In a further attack on the formation at 12:55 northeast of Wesel, Glunz claimed an Herausschuss over another B-17 which was not confirmed. Glunz again attacked the formation at 13:10 and claimed a further B-17 Herausschuss. Flying his second mission of the day, Glunz claimed an aerial victory over a P-47 escort fighter of the 78th Fighter Group at 15:30 northwest of Geilenkirchen. At 15:35, he was credited with a B-17 shot down southwest of Grevenbroich. Another B-17 claimed at 15:40 near Geilenkirchen was not confirmed. In total, he had claimed six aerial victories that day, four confirmed and two were unconfirmed, bringing his total to 58 aerial victories.

Glunz was transferred to 6. Staffel on 25 February where he was appointed deputy Staffelkapitän to Leutnant Friedrich Lange. Command of 5. Staffel was passed to Hauptmann Walter Matoni. On 2 March, Lange was killed in action and Glunz was officially appointed Staffelkapitän of 6. Staffel on 3 March. He was promoted to Leutnant (second lieutenant) on 1 April 1944. In preparation of Operation Overlord, the Allied invasion of German-occupied Western Europe, the Eighth Air Force and the Allied Expeditionary Air Force, began attacking Luftwaffe airfields in France and Belgium on 9 May. Glunz led II. Gruppe that day and joined up with fighters from I. Gruppe of JG 26. In the first attack on the bombers, Glunz shot down a B-24 bomber from the 466th Bombardment Group (Heavy) east of Turnhout. On his second attack, he shot down another B-24 bomber belonging to the 453rd Bombardment Group south-southwest of Turnhout. Two days later he was credited with an Herausschuss of a B-24 bomber from the 44th Bombardment Group northeast of Châteaudun.

On 6 June, Allied forces launched the Normandy landings, and II. Gruppe moved to an airfield at Guyancourt. During the relocation flight from Mont-de-Marsan Airfield, Glunz spotted a flight of North American P-51 Mustang fighters strafing ground targets near Rouen. In this melee, Glunz damaged a P-51 and then broke off the attack. Four days later, Glunz claimed three aerial victories over P-47 fighters from the 365th Fighter Group. The aerial combat took place between the Orne Estuary and Lisieux. On 18 June, Glunz and his wingman Unteroffizier Gerhard Lissack encountered two RCAF No. 414 Squadron P-51 fighters on an aerial reconnaissance mission and near Coutances. Both Glunz and Lissack were credited with one aerial victory each. This was Glunz's last combat mission for some time. He then attended a war officers training course and was taken off combat duties.

Glunz was awarded the Knight's Cross of the Iron Cross with Oak Leaves (Ritterkreuz des Eisernen Kreuzes mit Eichenlaub) on 24 June 1944 after 65 victories. The award was officially presented at the Führerhauptquartier at Rastenburg on 2 August 1944 by Adolf Hitler. Also present at the ceremony were Friedrich Lang, Erich Hartmann and Heinz-Wolfgang Schnaufer who receive the Knight's Cross of the Iron Cross with Oak Leaves and Swords (Ritterkreuz des Eisernen Kreuzes mit Eichenlaub und Schwertern), and Horst Kaubisch and Eduard Skrzipek who were also awarded the Oak Leaves. Prior to the presentation of the Oak Leaves, he had received the Front Flying Clasp of the Luftwaffe for fighter pilots in Gold with Pennant "200" (Frontflugspange für Jagdflieger in Gold mit Anhänger "200") on 10 July. Since Glunz was still on training, Hauptmann Georg-Peter Eder was temporarily given command of 6. Staffel on 11 August. On 4 September, Glunz returned from training and resumed command of 6. Staffel. On 21 September, during the Battle of Arnhem, Glunz shot down an unarmed Douglas C-47 Skytrain transport aircraft near Nijmegen on a mission to drop reinforcements for the British 1st Airborne Division. Combat with RCAF No. 401 Squadron Spitfire fighters on 2 October resulted in one aerial victory claimed by Glunz. II. Gruppe bounced the Spitfires near Nijmegen and claimed three Spitfires shot down while records show that two had been lost. During the Battle of Aachen, Glunz claimed a 474th Fighter Group Lockheed P-38 Lightning fighter shot down near Düren. Glunz was promoted to Oberleutnant (first lieutenant) on 10 October 1944, effective as of 1 October.

=== End of war ===
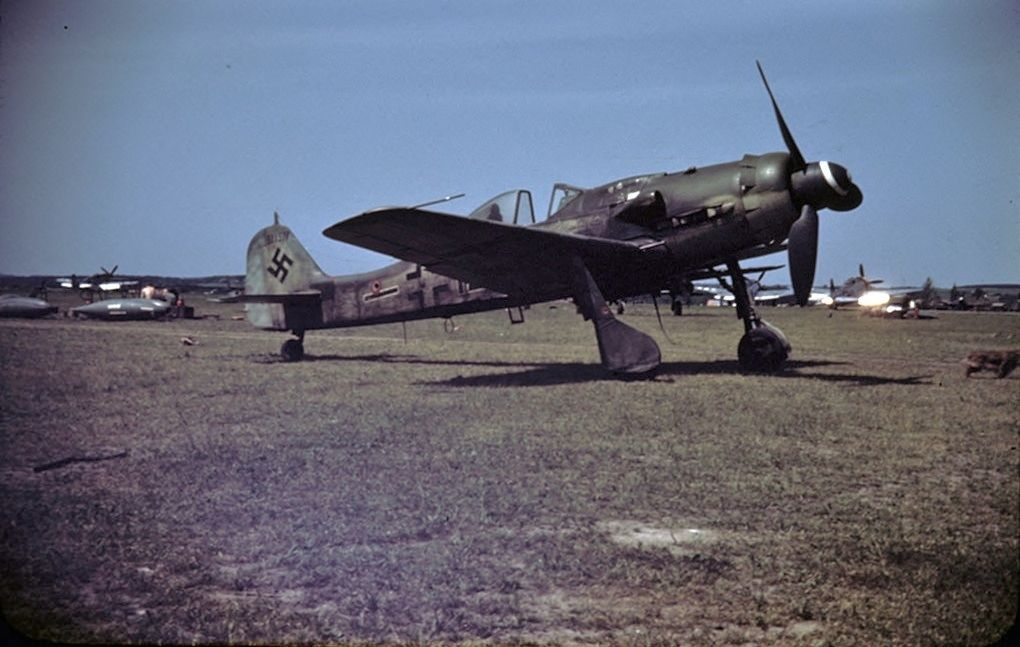
A Fw 190 D-9 similar to those flown by Glunz

On 17 December, II. Gruppe moved to an airfield at Nordhorn-Klausheide after having been converted to the new inline engine powered Fw 190 D-9. In support of German forces fighting in the Battle of the Bulge, Glunz claimed two P-47 fighters of the 36th Fighter Group shot down on 24 December near Liège. On 1 January 1945, Glunz led 6. Staffel in its attack on Brussels-Evere airfield during Operation Bodenplatte, an attempt to gain air superiority during the stagnant stage of the Battle of the Bulge. II. Gruppe, under the command of Major Anton Hackl, took off from Nordhorn at 08:29, arriving at the target area at approximately 09:20. At 09:25, fighters from No. 416 (RCAF) Squadron were scrambled to counter the German attack. The first Spitfires just made it into the air when sixty Fw 190s and Bf 109s arrived. Before reaching combat speed, Flight Lieutenant David Harling was shot down and killed by Glunz. In addition, Glunz made nine strafing attacks on Brussels-Evere airfield, claiming five aircraft destroyed, plus two further damaged, including one through the open door of a hangar.

Glunz flew his last mission of the war, a training flight on the Fw 190 D-9, on 3 February 1945. He left JG 26 on 18 March, transferring to III. Gruppe of Ergänzungs-Jagdgeschwader 2 (EJG 2—2nd Supplementary Training Wing), for conversion training to the then new Messerschmitt Me 262 jet fighter. In mid-April, he was then assigned II. Gruppe of Jagdgeschwader 7 (JG 7—7th Fighter Wing) under the command of Major Hermann Staiger. However Glunz never flew the Me 262 in combat. On 1 May 1945, Glunz was taken prisoner of war by US forces in Bavaria. He was released 1 June 1946 in Lenggries.

Glunz is credited with 71 aerial victories achieved in 574 combat missions. He engaged the enemy on 238 occasions and claimed all but three victories over the Western Front. Glunz was never shot down or wounded all this time. The nearest he came to losing an aircraft in combat was on 13 October 1944, when a broken oil pipe caused his engine to fail while fighting with two P-47 fighters.

== Later life ==
After his return, Glunz had to be rectified as pilot and obtained a civilian pilot license in Switzerland. He then founded a company for aerial photography. Glunz also became a motor racing driver. On 11 June 1950, he took third place in the XV Eifelrennen, a Formula Three motor race, driving a Scampolo 501 DKW. Theodor Weissenberger, his former commanding officer with JG 7, had also participated in this race and was involved in a fatal accident that day. On 20 August 1950, he participated in the Großer Preis von Deutschland (German Grand Prix) held on the Nürburgring. At the end of the 1950 German Formula 3 Championship, he finished in eighth place, tied with Oscar Frank with three points. In 1951, Glunz participated in various races of the 1951 German Formula 3 Championship, but did not score any points.

Following his racing career, he took a course on driver's education and founded his own driving school in Lüdenscheid where he lived with his wife Iris. Glunz died 1 August 2002 in Lüdenscheid.

== Summary of career ==
=== Aerial victory claims ===
According to US historian David T. Zabecki, Glunz was credited with 71 aerial victories. Spick also lists Glunz with 71 aerial victories claimed in 574 combat missions. This figure includes three aerial victories on the Eastern Front, and further 68 victories over the Western Allies, including 20 heavy bombers. Mathews and Foreman, authors of Luftwaffe Aces — Biographies and Victory Claims, researched the German Federal Archives and found records for 69 aerial victory claims, plus eleven further unconfirmed claims. This figure includes three aerial victories on the Eastern Front and 66 over the Western Allies, including 17 four-engined bombers.

Chronicle of aerial victories
This and the – (dash) indicates unconfirmed aerial victory claims for which Glunz did not receive credit. This along with the * (asterisk) indicates an Herausschuss (separation shot)—a severely damaged heavy bomber forced to separate from his combat box which was counted as an aerial victory. This along with the & (ampersand) indicates an endgültige Vernichtung (final destruction)—a coup de grâce inflicted on an already damaged heavy bomber. This along with the ! (exclamation mark) indicates that a heavy bomber was damaged. This and the ? (question mark) indicates information discrepancies listed by Caldwell, Prien, Stemmer, Rodeike, Bock, Mathews and Foreman.
Claim	Date	Time	Type	Location	Claim	Date	Time	Type	Location
– 4. Staffel of Jagdgeschwader 52 – Action at the Channel and over England — 26 June 1940 – 7 June 1941
1	7 May 1941	07:46	Spitfire	5 km (3.1 mi) east of Deal	2	19 May 1941	12:40	Spitfire	north of Dover; Canterbury
– 4. Staffel of Jagdgeschwader 52 – Operation Barbarossa — 22 June – 4 October 1941
3	26 June 1941	09:33	DB-3		5	3 July 1941	18:23	DB-3	northeast of Barysaw
4	3 July 1941	18:20	DB-3	northeast of Barysaw					
– 4. Staffel of Jagdgeschwader 26 "Schlageter" – On the Western Front — 4 October – 31 December 1941
6	27 August 1941	08:25	Spitfire	Bergues	8	8 November 1941	13:08	Spitfire	15 km (9.3 mi) north of Calais
7	5 November 1941	10:40	Spitfire	Gravelines					
– 4. Staffel of Jagdgeschwader 26 "Schlageter" – On the Western Front — 1 January – 31 December 1942
9	9 January 1942	15:36	Spitfire	southwest of Le Touquet	17	8 June 1942	13:59	Spitfire	west-northwest of Dunkirk
10	12 February 1942	17:08	Spitfire	east of Eu	18	28 June 1942	21:16	Spitfire	Hastings
11	13 March 1942	16:29	Spitfire	over the sea, off Dungeness	19	31 July 1942	15:01	Spitfire	west of Berck-sur-Mer
12	10 April 1942	17:43	Spitfire	Étaples	20? (Note: According to Caldwell, Prien, Stemmer, Rodeike, Bock this claim is listed as Glunz's 20th aerial victory. Mathews and Foreman list this claim as unconfirmed.)	31 July 1942	15:08	Spitfire	west of Berck-sur-Mer
13	14 April 1942	18:50	Spitfire	Calais	21	19 August 1942	10:28	Spitfire	west of Dieppe
14	25 April 1942	16:43	Spitfire	Abbeville	22	5 September 1942	11:41	Spitfire	west of Berck-sur-Mer
15	17 May 1942	11:35	Spitfire	Ardres	23	2 November 1942	16:57	Spitfire	15 km (9.3 mi) west of Berck-sur-Mer
16	5 June 1942	15:50	Spitfire	15 km (9.3 mi) west-northwest of Ault					
– 4. Staffel of Jagdgeschwader 26 "Schlageter" – On the Western Front — 1 January – October 1943
—	3 February 1943	15:30	Spitfire		35	20 June 1943	13:35	Spitfire	northeast of Étaples southeast of Étaples
24	17 February 1943	10:50	Spitfire	Ardres	36	22 June 1943	09:20	B-17	west of Bergen op Zoom
25	26 February 1943	10:37	Spitfire	Saint-Omer	37	26 June 1943	18:54	P-47	northwest of Neufchâtel
26	8 March 1943	14:06? (Note: According to Mathews and Foreman claimed at 14:08.)	Spitfire	Rouen	—	26 June 1943	18:55	P-47	northwest of Neufchâtel
27	14 March 1943	17:59	Spitfire	3 km (1.9 mi) southwest of Boulogne	—	4 July 1943	17:25? (Note: According to Mathews and Foreman claimed at 17:45.)	Spitfire	Eu near Amiens
28	28 March 1943	18:41	Mosquito	south of Lille	— (Note: According to Caldwell, this endgültige Vernichtung (final destruction) was counted as Glunz's 38th aerial victory.)	12 August 1943	09:05	B-17&	coal-mine Hagen
29	28 March 1943	18:42	Mosquito	south of Lille	38	12 August 1943	09:28	B-17	PQ NP-4, Mönchengladbach
30	3 April 1943	16:08	Spitfire	Le Touquet	39	17 August 1943	17:50? (Note: According to Mathews and Foreman claimed at 17:35.)	B-17	Hasselt/Antwerp northwest of Schouwen
31	4 April 1943	14:42	Spitfire	southwest of Dieppe	—	19 August 1943	12:30	B-26!	northern France
32	5 April 1943	15:38? (Note: According to Mathews and Foreman claimed at 15:40.)	B-17*	Dinteloord	40	31 August 1943	19:32	B-17	south of Le Tréport
33	11 June 1943	16:42	Spitfire	north of Doullens	41	3 September 1943	10:35	B-17	east of Paris
34	16 June 1943	07:07	Spitfire	20 km (12 mi) northwest of Cap Gris-Nez	—	3 October 1943	16:00	Spitfire	
– 5. Staffel of Jagdgeschwader 26 "Schlageter" – On the Western Front — October – 31 December 1943
42	10 October 1943	15:41	B-17	north of Deelen; Harskamp	46	26 November 1943	11:03	B-17	La Neuville, near Beauvais
—	14 October 1943	14:00	P-47	vicinity of Budel	47	1 December 1943	10:03	Spitfire	25 km (16 mi) southwest of Arras
43	11 November 1943	14:55	B-17	southwest of Dordrecht	48	1 December 1943	10:03? (Note: According to Mathews and Foreman claimed at 10:05.)	Spitfire	25 km (16 mi) southwest of Arras
—	11 November 1943	14:57	B-17	southwest of Dordrecht	49	21 December 1943	11:50	Spitfire	Vimy Ridge, southwest of Douai
44	14 November 1943	10:06	Mosquito	Lens, southwest of Lille	50	31 December 1943	15:00	B-17	Plaçamen, west-northwest of Lorient
45	26 November 1943	10:40	P-47	Chantilly; Domont					
– 5. Staffel of Jagdgeschwader 26 "Schlageter" – On the Western Front — 1 January – 25 February 1944
51	7 January 1944	13:45? (Note: According to Mathews and Foreman claimed at 13:40.)	P-47	vicinity of Boulogne	55	22 February 1944	13:10	B-17*	12 km (7.5 mi) northeast of Wesel
52	11 February 1944	14:05	B-17	20 km (12 mi) northwest of Poix (Note: There are several places called Poix, and it is unclear which this one was. However, it may be noted that there was an important Luftwaffe airfield at Poix-de-Picardie.)	56	22 February 1944	15:30	P-47	15 km (9.3 mi) northeast of Geilenkirchen
53	21 February 1944	15:50	B-17	6 km (3.7 mi) west of Bergen aan Zee	57	22 February 1944	15:35	B-17	southwest of Grevenbroich
54	22 February 1944	12:50	B-17	7 km (4.3 mi) west of Dorsten	—	22 February 1944	15:40	B-17	Geilenkirchen
—	22 February 1944	12:55	B-17*		—	25 February 1944	17:00	B-17	
– 6. Staffel of Jagdgeschwader 26 "Schlageter" – On the Western Front — 3 March 1944 – 1 January 1945
58	9 May 1944	09:51	B-24	7 km (4.3 mi) east of Turnhout	65	21 September 1944	17:18	C-47	Nijmegen
59	9 May 1944	09:57	B-24	7 km (4.3 mi) south-southwest of Turnhout	66	2 October 1944	12:15	Spitfire	south of Nijmegen
60	11 May 1944	14:00? (Note: According to Mathews and Foreman claimed at 14:05.)	B-24*	northeast of Châteaudun	67	13 October 1944	15:00	P-38	Düren
61	10 June 1944	17:56	P-47	north of Lisieux	68	24 December 1944	12:27	P-47	Liège
62	10 June 1944	17:58	P-47	north of Lisieux	69	24 December 1944	12:28	P-47	Liège
63	10 June 1944	17:58	P-47	north of Lisieux	70	1 January 1945	09:25	Spitfire	south of Brussels-Evere airfield
64	18 June 1944	17:29	P-51	Coutances					

=== Awards ===
- Pilot Badge (4 October 1940)
- Iron Cross (1939)
  - 2nd Class (26 May 1941)
  - 1st Class (8 June 1941)
- Front Flying Clasp of the Luftwaffe for fighter pilots in Gold with Pennant "200"
  - in Bronze (1 July 1941)
  - in Silver (1 October 1941)
  - in Gold (25 August 1942)
  - Pennant "200" (10 July 1944)
- Honour Goblet of the Luftwaffe (Ehrenpokal der Luftwaffe) on 29 June 1942 as Feldwebel and pilot
- German Cross in Gold on 15 October 1942 as Feldwebel in the 4./Jagdgeschwader 26 (Note: According to Caldwell and Obermaier on 1 November 1942.)
- Knight's Cross of the Iron Cross with Oak Leaves
  - Knight's Cross on 29 August 1943 as Oberfeldwebel and pilot in the 4./Jagdgeschwader 26 "Schlageter"
  - 508th Oak Leaves on 24 June 1944 as Leutnant (war officer) and pilot in the 6./Jagdgeschwader 26 "Schlageter"

=== Dates of rank ===
1 May 1941:	Unteroffizier (subordinate officer or sergeant)
1 August 1941:	Feldwebel (technical sergeant)
1 January 1943:	Oberfeldwebel (master sergeant)
1 April 1944:	Leutnant (second lieutenant)
1 October 1944:	Oberleutnant (first lieutenant)
