= Le Déluge =

- Part of La Drenne
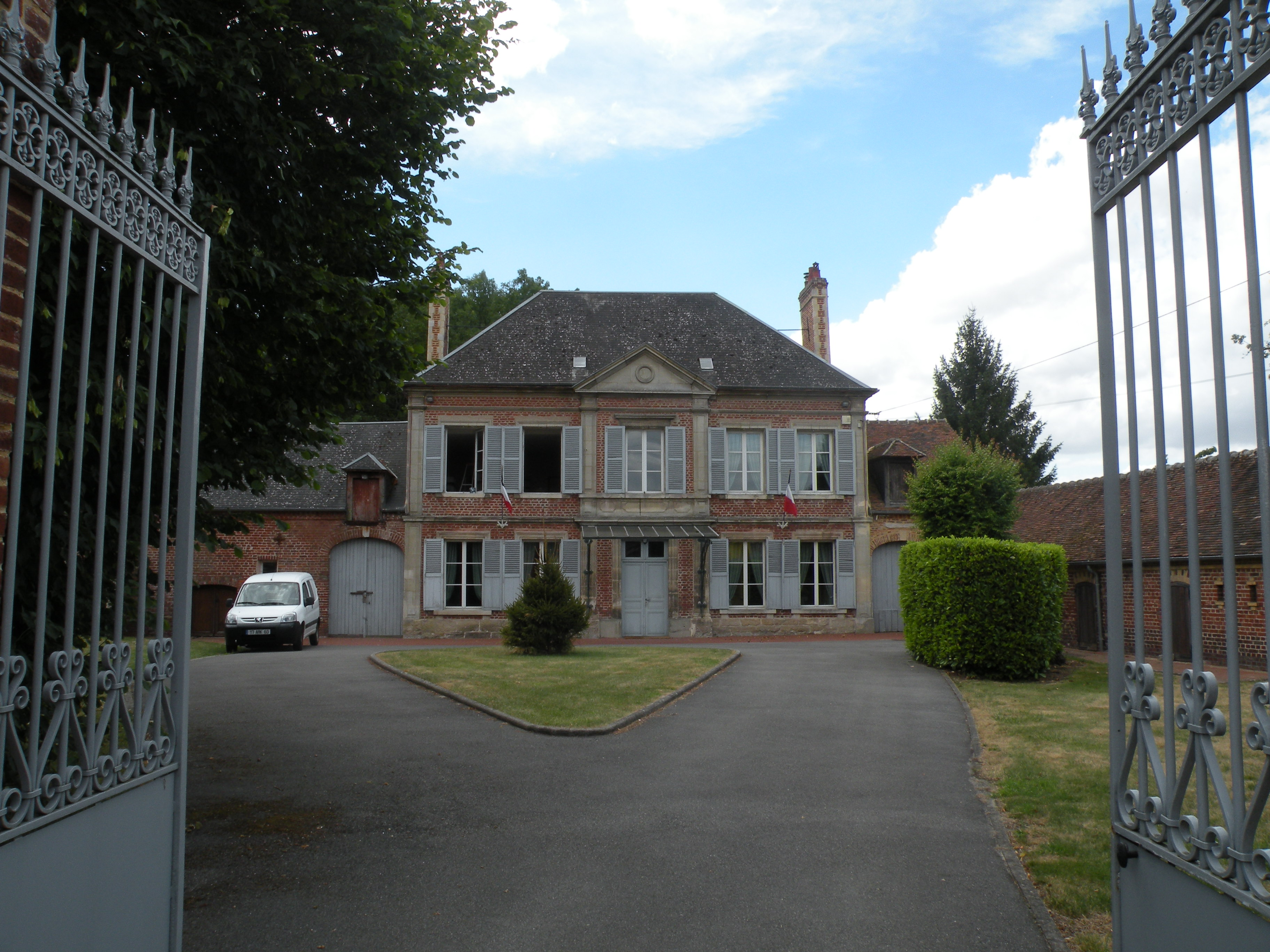
- Town hall
- Location of Le Déluge
- Location within France Location within Hauts-de-France
- Coordinates: 49°17′51″N 2°06′39″E
- Country: France
- Region: Hauts-de-France
- Department: Oise
- Arrondissement: Beauvais
- Canton: Chaumont-en-Vexin
- Commune: La Drenne
- Area^{1}: 3.69 km^{2} (1.42 sq mi)
- Elevation: 232 m (761 ft)
- Highest elevation: 212 m (696 ft)
- Lowest elevation: 162 m (531 ft)
- Population (2022): 606
  - Density: 164/km^{2} (425/sq mi)
- Time zone: UTC+01:00 (CET)
  - Summer (DST): UTC+02:00 (CEST)
- Postal code: 60790
- ^{1} French Land Register data, which excludes lakes, ponds, glaciers > 1 km^{2} (0.386 sq mi or 247 acres) and river estuaries.

Le Déluge (French pronunciation: [lə delyʒ]) is a former commune in the Oise department in northern France. On 1 January 2017, it was merged into the new commune La Drenne.

== See also ==
- Communes of the Oise department
