= La Drenne =

- Commune
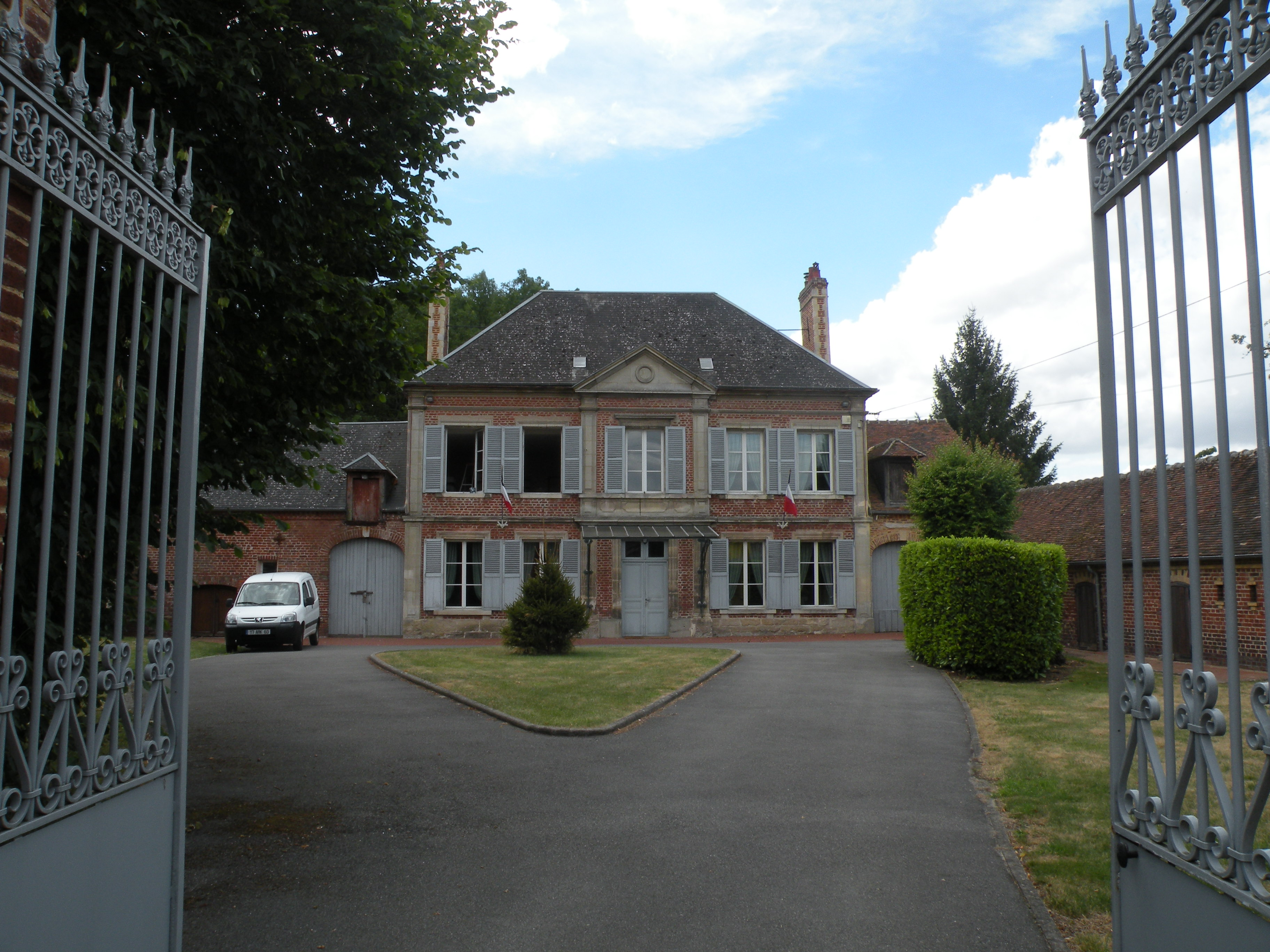
- The town hall in Le Déluge
- Location of La Drenne
- Location within France Location within Hauts-de-France
- Coordinates: 49°17′53″N 2°06′40″E
- Country: France
- Region: Hauts-de-France
- Department: Oise
- Arrondissement: Beauvais
- Canton: Chaumont-en-Vexin
- Intercommunality: Les Sablons

Government
  - Mayor (2020–2026): Jean-Sebastien Delaville
- Area^{1}: 13.87 km^{2} (5.36 sq mi)
- Population (2023): 1,080
  - Density: 77.9/km^{2} (202/sq mi)
- Time zone: UTC+01:00 (CET)
  - Summer (DST): UTC+02:00 (CEST)
- INSEE/Postal code: 60196 /60790
- ^{1} French Land Register data, which excludes lakes, ponds, glaciers > 1 km^{2} (0.386 sq mi or 247 acres) and river estuaries.

La Drenne (French pronunciation: [la dʁɛn]) is a commune in the department of Oise, northern France. The municipality was established on 1 January 2017 by merger of the former communes of Le Déluge (the seat), La Neuville-d'Aumont and Ressons-l'Abbaye.

== See also ==
- Communes of the Oise department
