= Ressons-l'Abbaye =

- Part of La Drenne
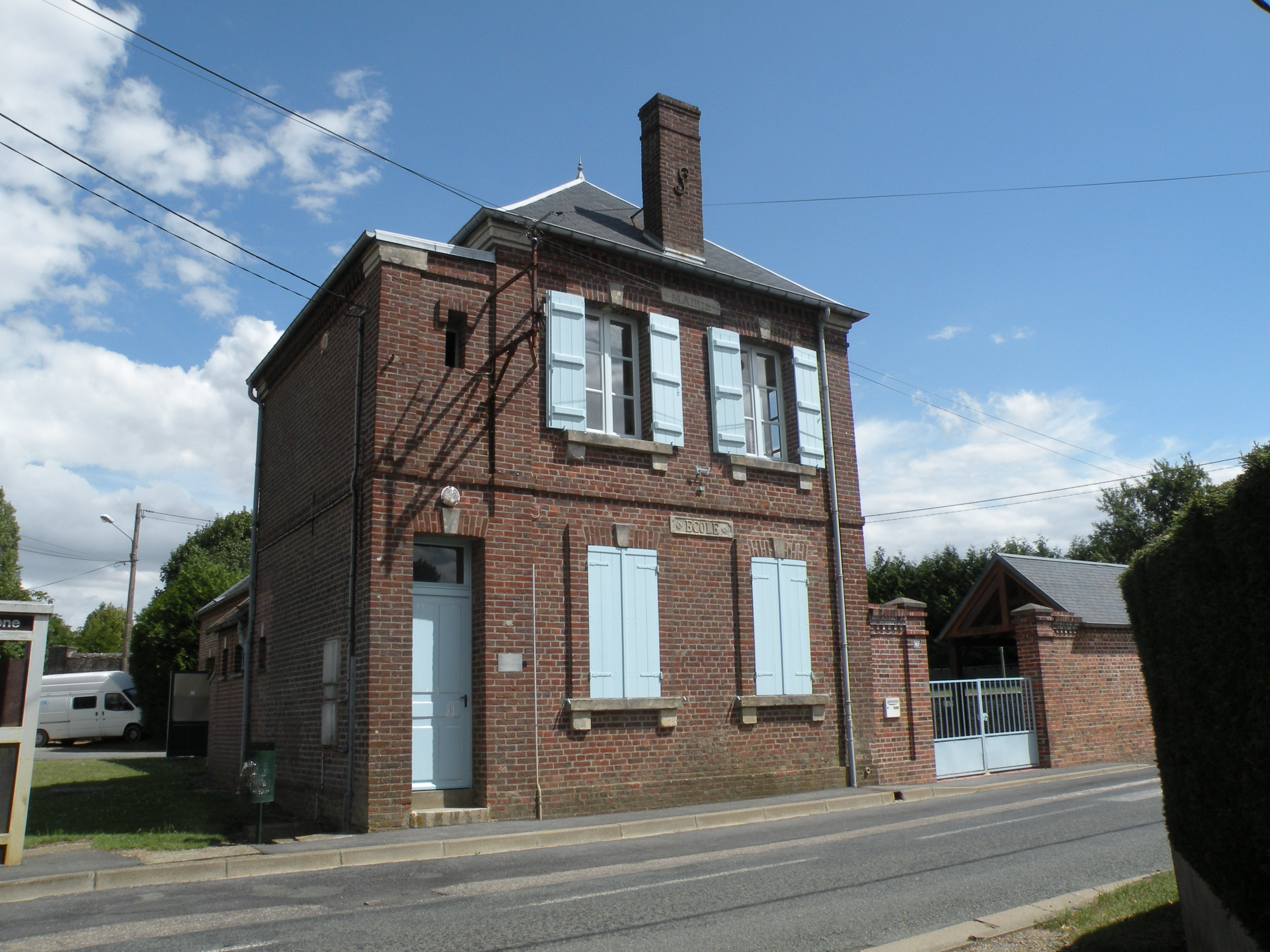
- Town hall
- Location of Ressons-l'Abbaye
- Location within France Location within Hauts-de-France
- Coordinates: 49°18′10″N 2°05′20″E
- Country: France
- Region: Hauts-de-France
- Department: Oise
- Arrondissement: Beauvais
- Canton: Chaumont-en-Vexin
- Commune: La Drenne
- Area^{1}: 5.43 km^{2} (2.10 sq mi)
- Elevation: 141 m (463 ft)
- Highest elevation: 222 m (728 ft)
- Lowest elevation: 154 m (505 ft)
- Population (2022): 132
  - Density: 24.3/km^{2} (63.0/sq mi)
- Time zone: UTC+01:00 (CET)
  - Summer (DST): UTC+02:00 (CEST)
- Postal code: 60790
- ^{1} French Land Register data, which excludes lakes, ponds, glaciers > 1 km^{2} (0.386 sq mi or 247 acres) and river estuaries.

Ressons-l'Abbaye (before 1994: Ressons) is a former commune in the Oise department in northern France. On 1 January 2017, it was merged into the new commune La Drenne.

== See also ==
- Communes of the Oise department
