= 323d Strategic Reconnaissance Squadron =

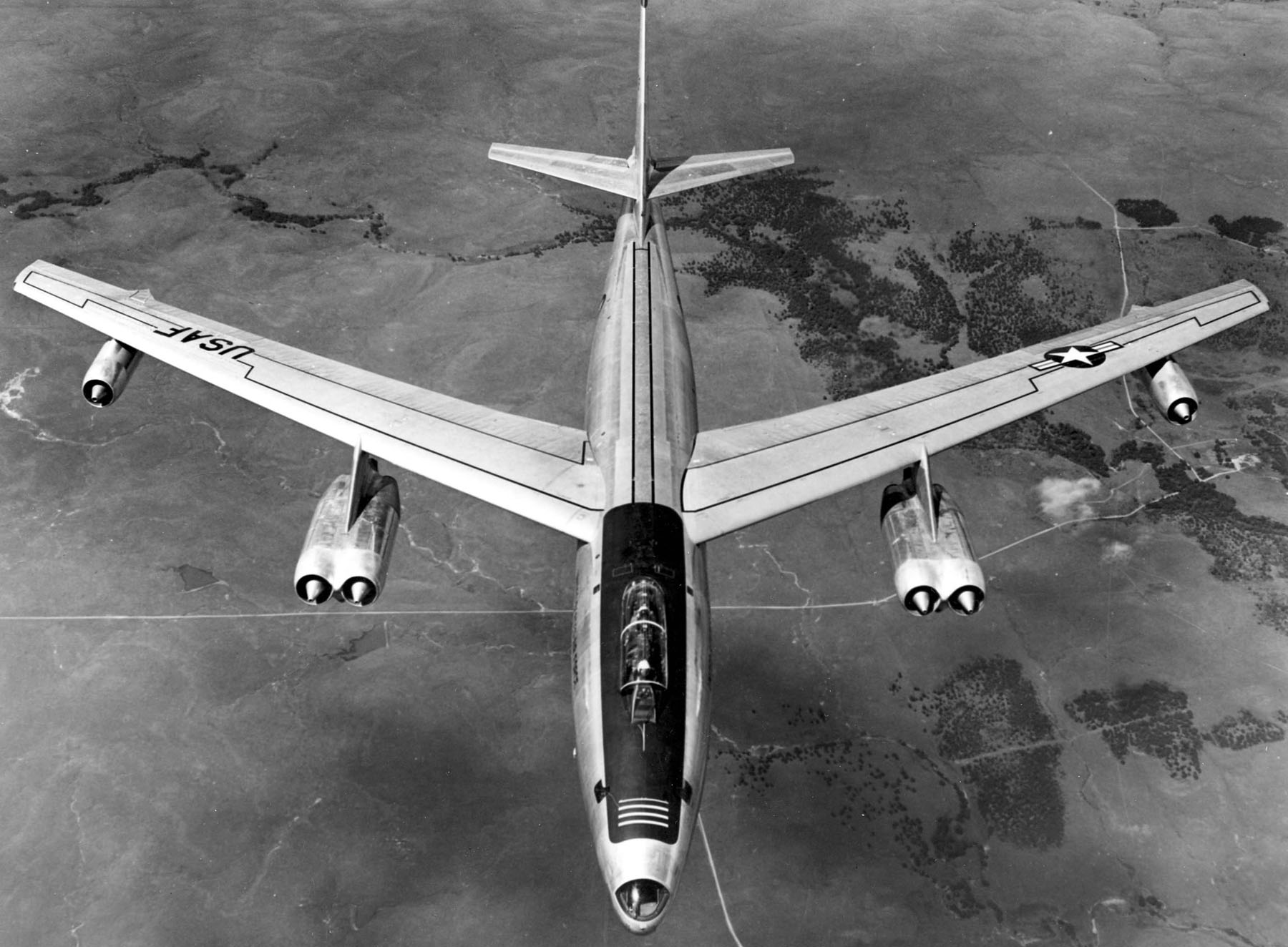
- Boeing RB-47E Stratojet as flown by the squadron
- Active: 1942–1945; 1947–1948; 1949–1957
- Country: United States
- Branch: United States Air Force
- Role: Strategic reconnaissance
- Engagements: European Theater of Operations
- Decorations: Distinguished Unit Citation; Air Force Outstanding Unit Award

Insignia
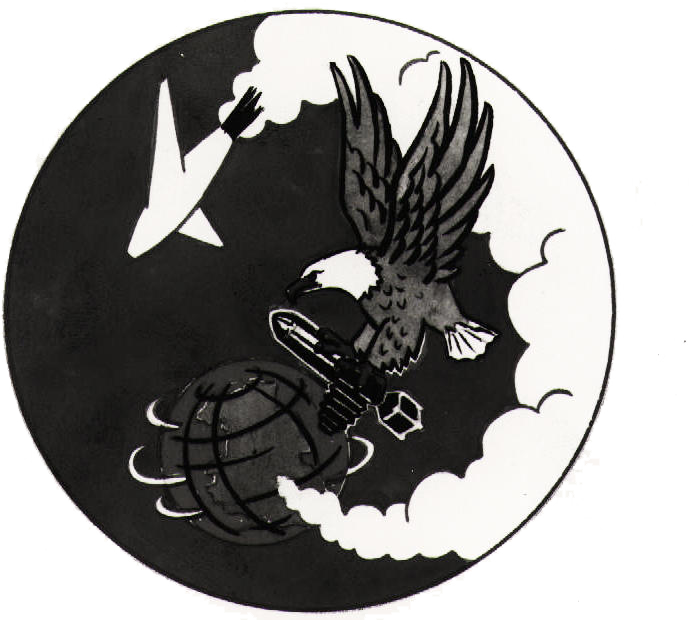
- 323d Strategic Reconnaissance Squadron emblem (Note: Approved 23 October 1953. Description: On a blue disc and eagle (grey with white head and tail and yellow beak and feet) in flight and carrying a red serial bomb in his right foot and a black camera in his left with wings extending over a crescent shaped cloud formation issuing from a white ram jet with red exhaust in dexter chief and extending downwards around the disc and ending over a yellow spinning globe (with grey-blue land areas, black longitude and latitude lines and white speed lines) in center base.)

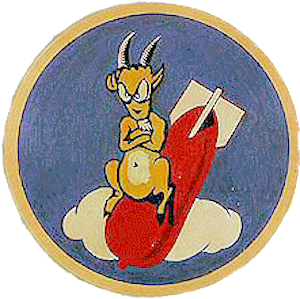
- 323d Bombardment Squadron emblem
- World War II fuselage code: OR

The 323d Strategic Reconnaissance Squadron is an inactive United States Air Force unit. It was last assigned to the 91st Strategic Reconnaissance Wing at Lockbourne Air Force Base, Ohio, where it was inactivated on 8 November 1957.

The squadron was first activated in 1942 as the 323d Bombardment Squadron. After training in the United States, it moved to the European Theater of Operations, where it participated in the strategic bombing campaign against Germany. It was awarded two Distinguished Unit Citations for combat in Germany. Following V-E Day, the squadron returned to the United States and was inactivated in late 1945.

The squadron was redesignated the 323rd Reconnaissance Squadron and activated at Andrews Air Force Base, Maryand, in 1947 moving to McGuire Air Force Base, New Jersey, where it was inactivated in 1948 without becoming operational. It was activated the following year at McGuire as the 323d Strategic Reconnaissance Squadron. It performed strategic reconnaissance missions until it was inactivated at Lockbourne.

== History ==
=== World War II ===
==== Organization and training in the United States ====
The squadron was first activated on 15 April 1942 at Harding Field as the 323rd Bombardment Squadron, one of the three original bombardment squadrons of the 91st Bombardment Group. (Note: The group was also assigned a reconnaissance squadron, but this unit was quickly redesignated as the group's fourth bombardment squadron.) It was equipped with the Boeing B-17 Flying Fortress. It completed First Phase training at MacDill Field under Third Air Force, with Second and Third Phase training at Walla Walla Army Air Field under Second Air Force in Washington. The squadron's ground echelon left for Fort Dix in early September 1942, then boarded the RMS Queen Mary for transport to England. The air echelon moved to Gowen Field, Idaho on 24 August 1942, and began receiving new B-17s there. It becan flying them from Dow Field, Maine in September, although it was not fully equipped with new aircraft until October.

==== Combat in Europe ====
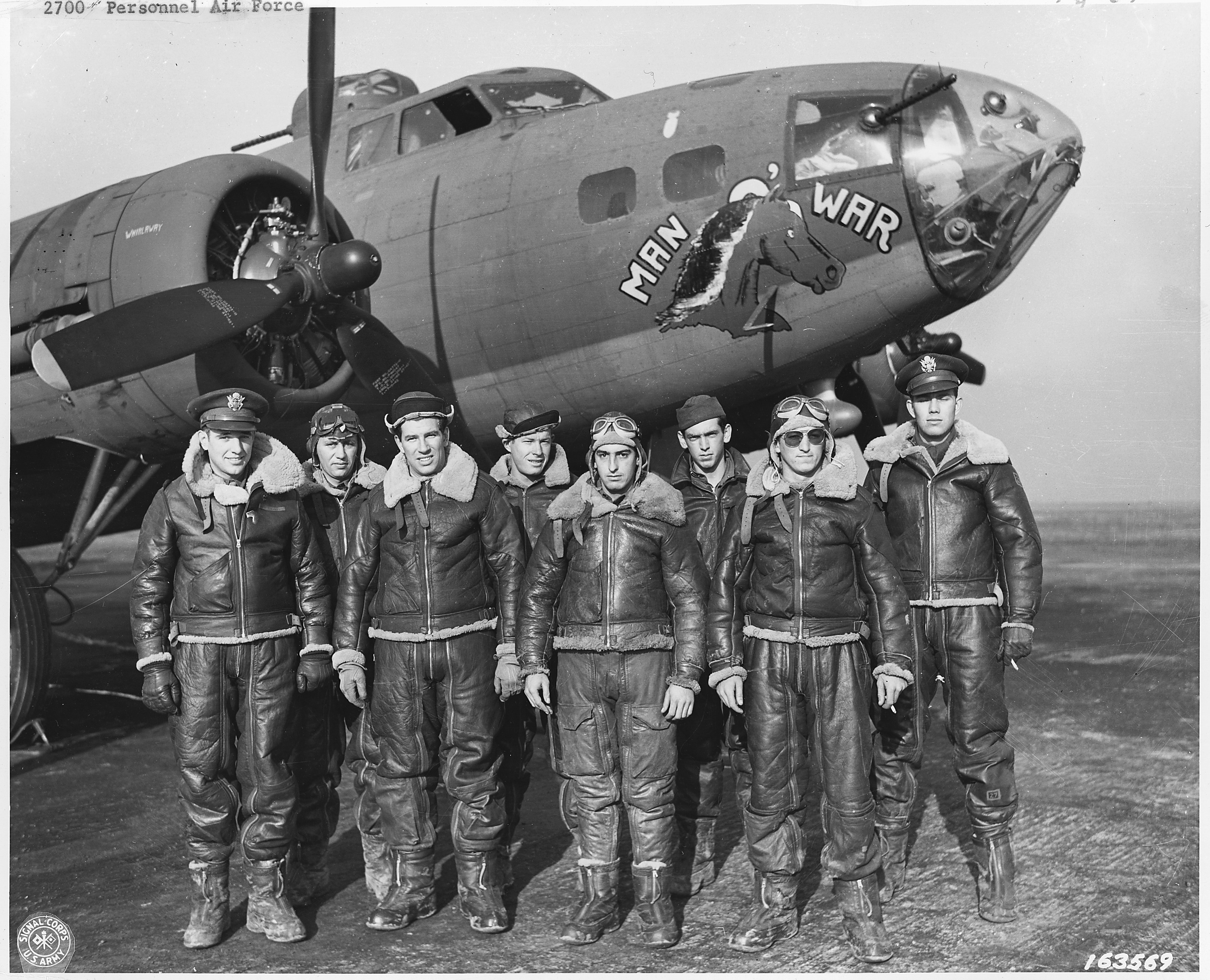
The crew of squadron B-17F "Man-O-War" (Note: Aircraft is Boeing B-17F-5-BO Flying Fortress, serial 41-24399. This aircraft was shot down by Hauptmann Johannes Naumann in a Fw 190A-6 of 6 Staffel/Jagdgeschwader 26 on a mission to Kassel, Germany, crashing at Opijnen, Netherlands on 30 July 1943. Eight of the crew were killed, two became prisoners. Missing Aircrew Report 148.)

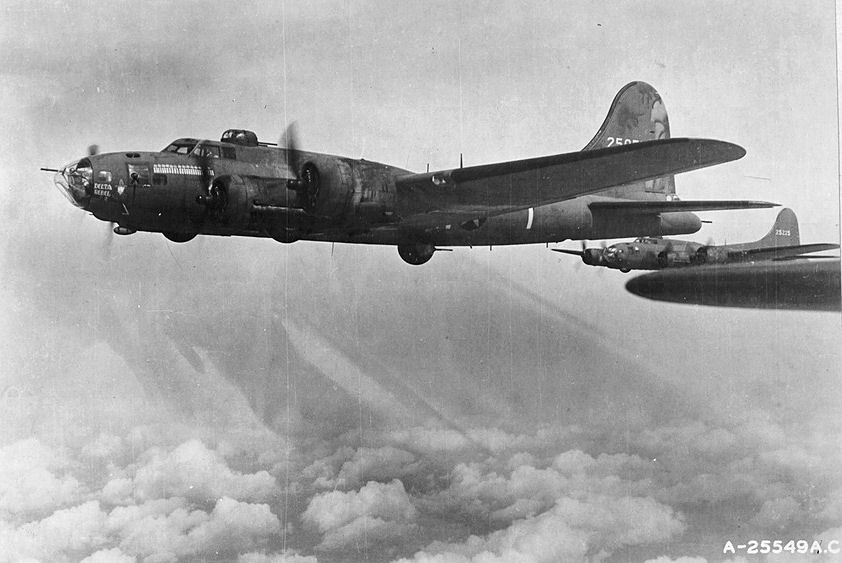
323rd Bomb Squadron B-17F Flying Fortress Delta Rebel No. 2 (Note: This aircraft is Boeing B-17F-30-BO Flying Fortress, serial 42-5077. This plane was shot down on a 12 August 1943 mission to Gelsenkirchen, Germany. It was damaged first by Hauptmann Johannes Naumann, then shot down by Oberfeldwebel Adolf Glunz of 4 Staffel/Jagdgeshwader 26 in a Fw 190A-5 over Brunninghausen, Germany. Four of the crew were killed, 6 became prisoners of war. Miising Aircrew Report 261).)

The ground echelon was established temporarily at RAF Kimbolton by 13 September 1942. However, the runways at Kimbolton were not up to handling heavy bombers, and the unit moved to what would be its permanent station in the European Theater of Operations, RAF Bassingbourn, on 14 October 1942. Bassingbourn had been a prewar Royal Air Force station, so the squadron found itself in more comfortable quarters than most of its contemporaries. The squadron primarily engaged in the strategic bombing campaign against Germany, and flew its first mission on 7 November, an attack against submarine pens at Brest, France.

Until the middle of 1943, The squadron concentrated its attacks on naval targets, including submarine pens, dockyards, ship construction facilities and harbors, although it also struck airfields, factories, and communications facilities. On 27 January 1943, the unit attacked the Kriegsmarine yard at Wilhelmshaven as part of the first penetration by bombers of VIII Bomber Command to a target in Germany. On 4 March 1943, it attacked marshalling yards at Hamm, Germany despite adverse weather and heavy enemy opposition. For this action, it was awarded its first Distinguished Unit Citation (DUC).

From the middle of 1943 to the end of the war, the squadron concentrated on attacks on German aviation, including attacks on aircraft factories, including ones at Oranienburg and Brussels; airfields at Oldenburg and Villacoublay; the ball bearing plants at Schweinfurt; chemical plants at Leverkusen and Peenemunde; and industrial facilities in Ludwigshafen, Frankfurt am Main and Wilhemshaven. As part of this attack on the German aircraft industry, on 11 January, the squadron penetrated into central Germany, despite bad weather, poor fighter cover, and strong attacks by enemy interceptor aircraft, the unit succeeded in bombing its target, earning a second DUC.

The squadron also performed interdiction and air support missions. It helped prepare for Operation Overlord, the invasion of Normandy, by bombing gun emplacements and troop concentrations near the beachhead area. It aided Operation Cobra, the breakout at Saint Lo, in July 1944 by attacking enemy troop positions. It supported troops on the front lines near Caen in August 1944 and attacked lines of communications near the battlefield during the Battle of the Bulge in December 1944 and January 1945. It attacked airfields, bridges, and railroads to support Operation Lumberjack, the push across the Rhine in Germany, in 1945.

Following V-E Day, the squadron evacuated prisoners of war from German camps. The first B-17 left Bassingbourn for the United States on 27 May 1945. The ground echelon sailed aboard the RMS Queen Elizabeth on 24 June 1945. The squadron was reestablished at Drew Field, Florida in early July, with the intention of deploying it to the Pacific, but it was not fully manned or equipped, and inactivated on 7 November 1945.

=== Cold War ===
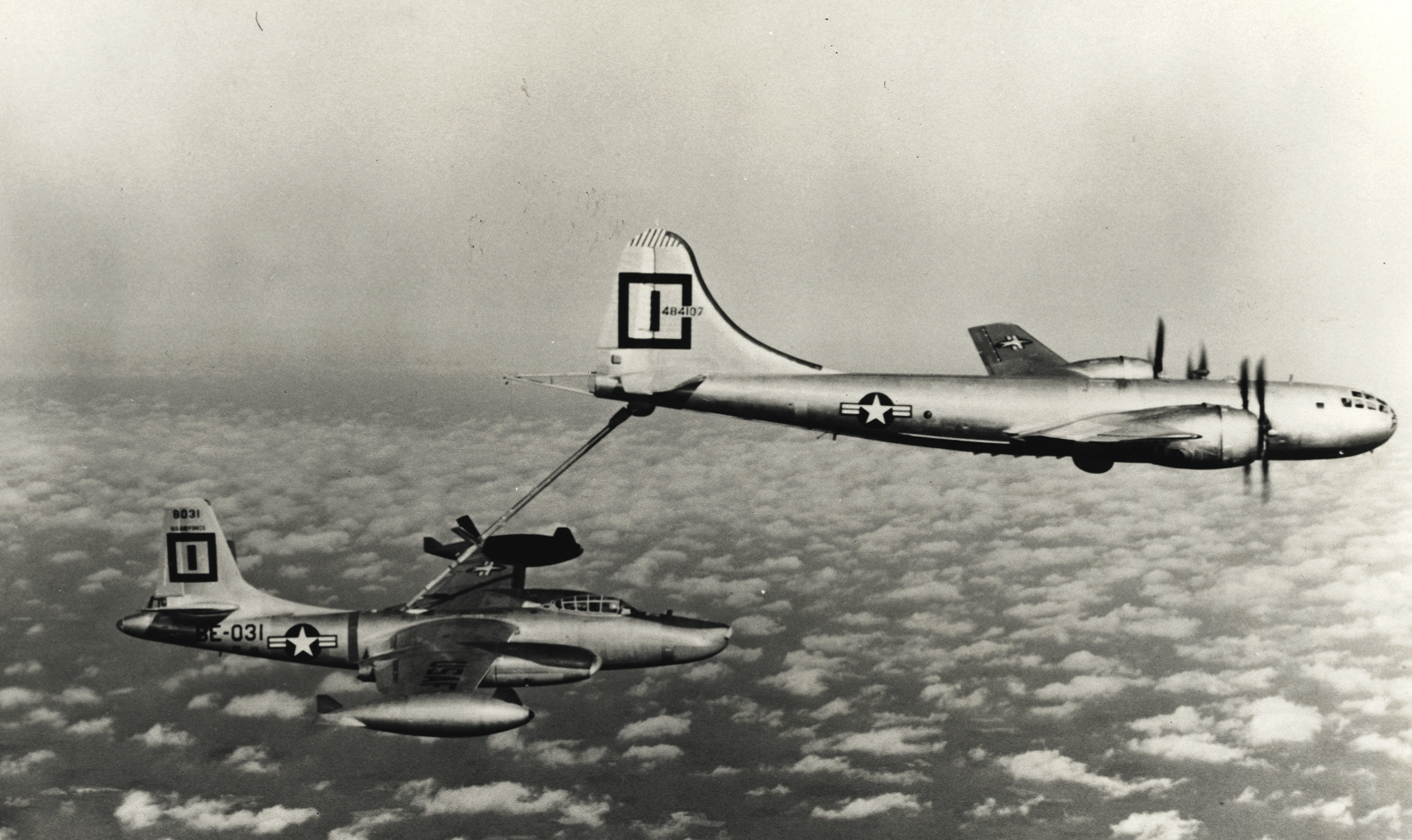
Squadron RB-45C refueling with a 91st Wing KB-29

The squadron was reactivated in July 1947 at Andrews Field, Maryland as the 323rd Reconnaissance Squadron. It moved to McGuire Air Force Base, New Jersey in July 1948 and was inactivated there in November. The squadron does not appear to have been operational during this time It was activated again at McGuire, this time as the 323rd Strategic Reconnaissance Squadron, on 1 June 1949 and began equipping with Boeing RB-29 Superfortresses. In September 1949 it moved to Forbes Air Force Base, Kansas, where it was attached to the 55th Strategic Reconnaissance Wing for a planned upgrade to the Boeing B-50 model of the Superfortress. However, the squadron did not upgrade to the RB-50, instead moving to Barksdale Air Force Base, Louisiana in October, where it began to fly the North American RB-45 Tornado in 1950.

Strategic Air Command (SAC) decided its wing commanders should focus on combat operations, while the air base group commander would manage base housekeeping functions. Under this plan the wing's combat squadrons reported directly to the wing and the intermediate group was eliminated. In February 1951, the 91st Group became nonoperational and the squadron was assigned directly to the 91st Strategic Reconnaissance Wing. In September 1951 the squadron moved to Lockbourne Air Force Base, Ohio, where it re-equipped with Boeing RB-47E Stratojets in 1953. The squadron frequently provided crews and aircraft to detachments of the 91st Wing that performed reconnaissance in overseas areas. Between August and November 1956, most of the squadron was deployed overseas and was operationally controlled by another organization. It continued worldwide reconnaissance missions until inactivating in November 1957.

== Lineage ==
- Constituted as the 323d Bombardment Squadron (Heavy) on 28 January 1942

Activated on 15 April 1942
Redesignated 323d Bombardment Squadron, Heavy on 20 August 1943
Inactivated on 7 November 1945
Redesignated 323d Reconnaissance Squadron on 11 June 1947
Activated on 1 July 1947
Inactivated on 10 November 1948
Activated on 1 June 1949
Redesignated: 323d Strategic Reconnaissance Squadron, Medium on 6 July 1950
Inactivated on 8 November 1957

=== Assignments ===
- 91st Bombardment Group, 15 April 1942 – 7 November 1945
- 91st Reconnaissance Group, 1 July 1947 – 10 November 1948
- 91st Strategic Reconnaissance Group, 1 July 1947 (attached to 55th Strategic Reconnaissance Wing 19 September – 10 October 1949, 91st Strategic Reconnaissance Wing after 10 February 1951)
- 91st Strategic Reconnaissance Wing, 28 May 1952 – 8 November 1957

=== Stations ===
- Harding Field, Louisiana, 15 April 1942
- MacDill Field, Florida, 13 May 1942
- Walla Walla Army Air Base, Washington, 22 June-24 August 1942
- RAF Kimbolton (AAF-117), England, 13 September 1942
- RAF Bassingbourn (AAF-121), England, 14 October 1942 – 22 June 1945
- Drew Field, Florida, 3 July-7 November 1945
- Andrews Field (later Andrews Air Force Base), Maryland, 1 July 1947
- McGuire Air Force Base, New Jersey, 19 July – 10 November 1948
- McGuire Air Force Base, New Jersey, 1 June 1949
- Forbes Air Force Base, Kansas, 19 September 1949
- Barksdale Air Force Base, Louisiana, 10 October 1949
- Lockbourne Air Force Base, Ohio, 11 September 1951 – 8 November 1957

=== Aircraft ===
- Boeing B-17 Flying Fortress, 1942–1945, 1949
- Boeing RB-17 Flying Fortress, 1948–1949
- Boeing B-29 Superfortress, 1949–1950
- Boeing RB-29 Superfortress, 1949–1950
- North American B-45 Tornado, 1950–1953
- North American RB-45C Tornado, 1950–1953
- Boeing RB-47E Stratojet, 1953–1957

=== Awards and campaigns ===
Award streamer	Award	Dates	Notes
	Presidential Unit Citation	Hamm, Germany 4 March 1943	323rd Bombardment Squadron
	Presidential Unit Citation	Germany, 11 January 1944	323rd Bombardment Squadron
	Air Force Outstanding Unit Award	8 September 1953–8 November 1957	323rd Strategic Reconnaissance Squadron

Campaign Streamer	Campaign	Dates	Notes
	Air Offensive, Europe	13 September 1942–5 June 1944	323rd Bombardment Squadron
	Air Combat, EAME Theater	13 September 1942–11 May 1945	323rd Bombardment Squadron
	Normandy	6 June 1944–24 July 1944	323rd Bombardment Squadron
	Northern France	25 July 1944–14 September 1944	323rd Bombardment Squadron
	Rhineland	15 September 1944–21 March 1945	323rd Bombardment Squadron
	Ardennes-Alsace	16 December 1944–25 January 1945	323rd Bombardment Squadron
	Central Europe	22 March 1944–21 May 1945	323rd Bombardment Squadron

== See also ==
- B-17 Flying Fortress units of the United States Army Air Forces
- List of B-29 Superfortress operators
- List of B-47 units of the United States Air Force
- List of United States Air Force reconnaissance squadrons
