= 91st Missile Wing =

US Air Force unit

Coordinates: 48°24′57″N 101°21′29″W

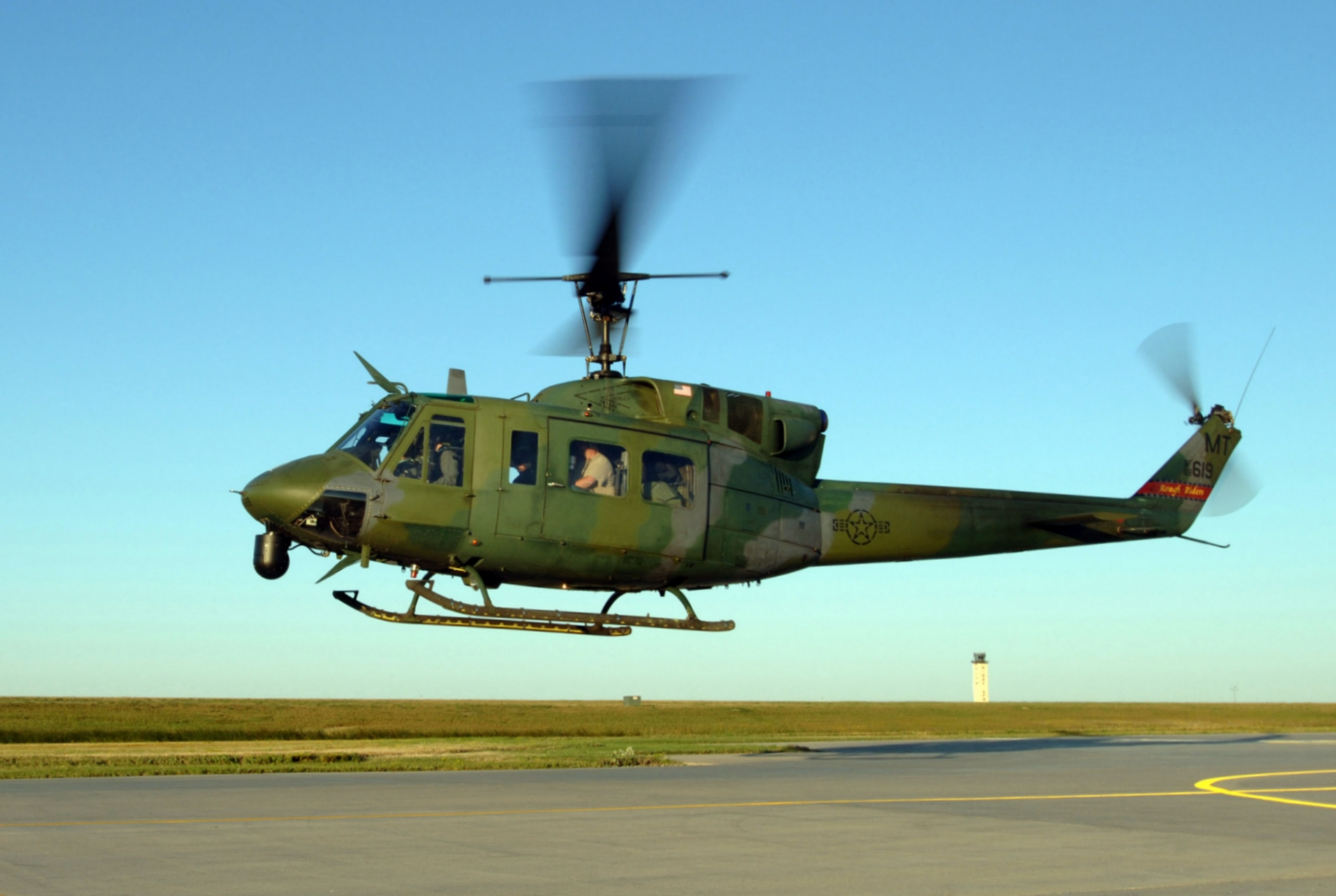
- UH-1N of the 54th Helicopter Squadron at Minot Air Force Base in 2005
- Active: 1948–1957, 1963–Present
- Country: United States
- Branch: United States Air Force
- Type: Missile
- Role: Strategic deterrence
- Size: 150 Minuteman III missiles 290 officers, 1,500 enlisted members and 25 civilian employees
- Part of: Air Force Global Strike Command
- Garrison/HQ: Minot Air Force Base, North Dakota
- Nickname: Rough Riders
- Motto: Poised For Peace
- Mascot: Theodore Roosevelt
- Decorations: Air Force Outstanding Unit Award

Commanders
- Current commander: Colonel George L. Chapman

Insignia
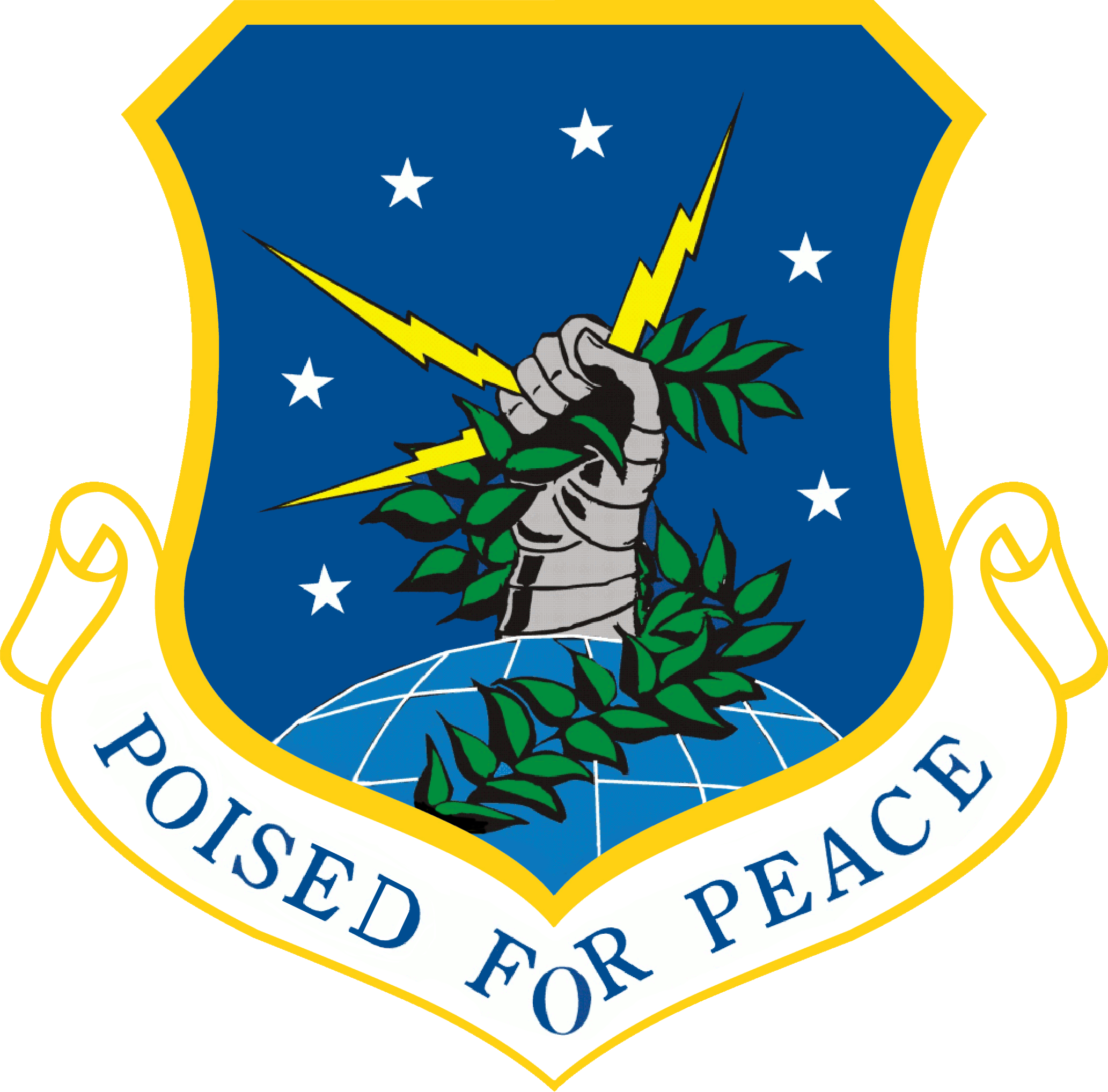
- 91st Missile Wing emblem (Note: Approved 21 November 1994. Description: Azure, a demi-globe issuant from base Azure grid-lined Argent, supporting a dexter hand vambraced (silver-gray) grasping three lightning bolts, one bendwise, one bendwise sinister to sinister chief, and one bendwise sinister to dexter base Or, and an olive branch entwining to dexter base Vert, all between an arc of six mullets of the third (Argent); all within a diminished bordure yellow. Significance: Blue and yellow are the Air Force colors. Blue alludes to the sky, the primary theater of Air Force operations. Yellow refers to the sun and the excellence requited of Air Force personnel. The globe represents the worldwide mission capabilities of the group. The armored hand grasping lightning bolts and issuant from the globe symbolizes the power and speed of the unit's weapons systems. The hand also grasps an olive branch which suggests that peace is attained through deterrence. The six stars reflect the spirit of the group's personnel and stand for integrity, courage, tenacity, service, competence, and patriotism.)

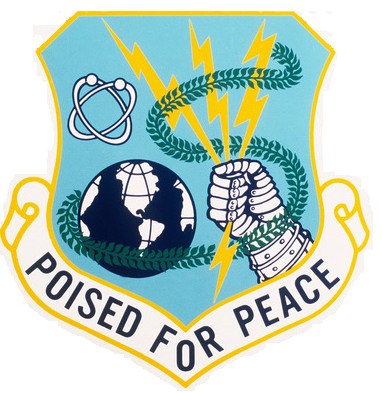
- 91st Bombardment Wing emblem (Note: Approved c. 23 August 1963. Description: Light blue, issuant from sinister base a mailed hand bendwise Argent grasping three lightning flashes to chief and one to base Or, in dexter base a sphere Azure with land areas of the second [color mentioned] and grid lines counterchanged of the last [color mentioned] and the fourth [color mentioned], over all an entwining olive wreath Vert, in dexter honor point a nuclear symbol of the second [color mentioned], all within a diminished bordure of the third [color mentioned]. Significance: Placed on an Azure blue background which portrays the sky as our primary theater of operations is the globe representing the scope of activities. Surrounding the world is the olive branch, symbolizing peace, which is also entwined with the mailed fist of SAC, poised and holding lightning bolts which symbolize the striking power of the wing. The nuclear symbol is indicative of the modern age in which we live, lending credibility to the awesome might held "poised for peace." .)

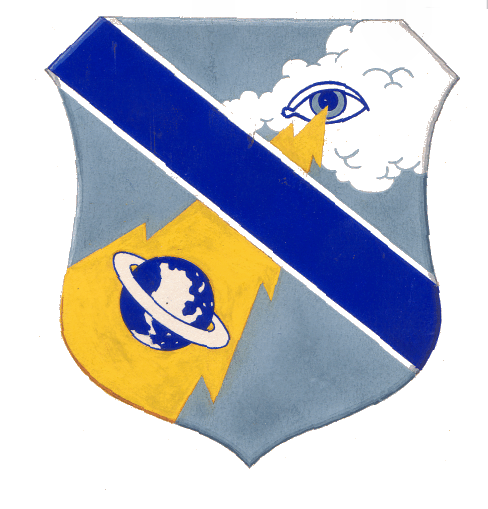
- 91st Strategic Reconnaissance Wing emblem (Note: Approved 23 December 1952. Description: Azure (light blue), a lightning flash issuing from dexter base and pointing to an eye proper on a cloud issuing from the sinister chief, on the flash in dexter base a sphere proper in an orbit argent; over all a bend azure fimbriated argent.)

The 91st Missile Wing is a United States Air Force unit assigned to the Air Force Global Strike Command Twentieth Air Force. It is stationed at Minot Air Force Base, North Dakota as a tenant unit.

The 91st is one of the Air Force's three intercontinental ballistic missile wings. The missile wing, whose members are known as the Rough Riders, is responsible for defending the United States by maintaining a fleet of 150 Minuteman III missiles and 15 Launch Control Centers located in underground facilities scattered across the northwest part of the state. The wing's missile complex stretches over 8,500 square miles—approximately the same size as Massachusetts.

The wing's on-alert missiles are controlled by U.S. Strategic Command, based at Offutt Air Force Base, Nebraska. To make sure of Mutually Assured Destruction, the command aims to make sure that intercontinental ballistic missiles are launched, if necessary, in accordance with Presidential orders.

The wing's predecessor, the World War II 91st Bombardment Group (Heavy) was a Boeing B-17 Flying Fortress unit formed at MacDill Field, Florida and subsequently stationed with Eighth Air Force at RAF Bassingbourn in the southern United Kingdom. It was one of the first United States Army Air Forces (AAF) heavy bomber groups deployed to Europe in 1942. It is most widely known as the unit in which the bomber Memphis Belle flew, and for having suffered the greatest number of losses of any heavy bombardment group in World War II.

As part of Strategic Air Command (SAC), the 91st wing was one of SAC's longest-lasting and most versatile wings. It was a strategic reconnaissance wing from 1948 to 1957 and a B-52 bombardment wing from 1963 to 1968. Its men flew virtually every plane in the SAC inventory. It became a missile wing in June 1968. On 1 July 2008, it was designated as the 91st Missile Wing.

The 91st Missile Wing is commanded by Colonel George L. Chapman, and its Command Chief Master Sergeant is Chief Master Sergeant Virgil A. Castro.

== Units ==
The wing's major organizations include:

- 91st Operations Group

54th Helicopter Squadron
91st Operations Support Squadron
740th Missile Squadron
741st Missile Squadron
742nd Missile Squadron

- 91st Maintenance Group

91st Missile Maintenance Squadron
791st Maintenance Squadron.

- 91st Security Forces Group

791st Missile Security Forces Squadron
891st Missile Security Forces Squadron
91st Missile Security Forces Squadron
91st Security Support Squadron
219th Missile Security Forces Squadron (attached from North Dakota Air National Guard)

The wing headquarters includes several special staff functions, such as plans and inspections, financial management, and safety.

== History ==
For related history and lineage, see 91st Operations Group

=== 91st Strategic Reconnaissance Wing ===
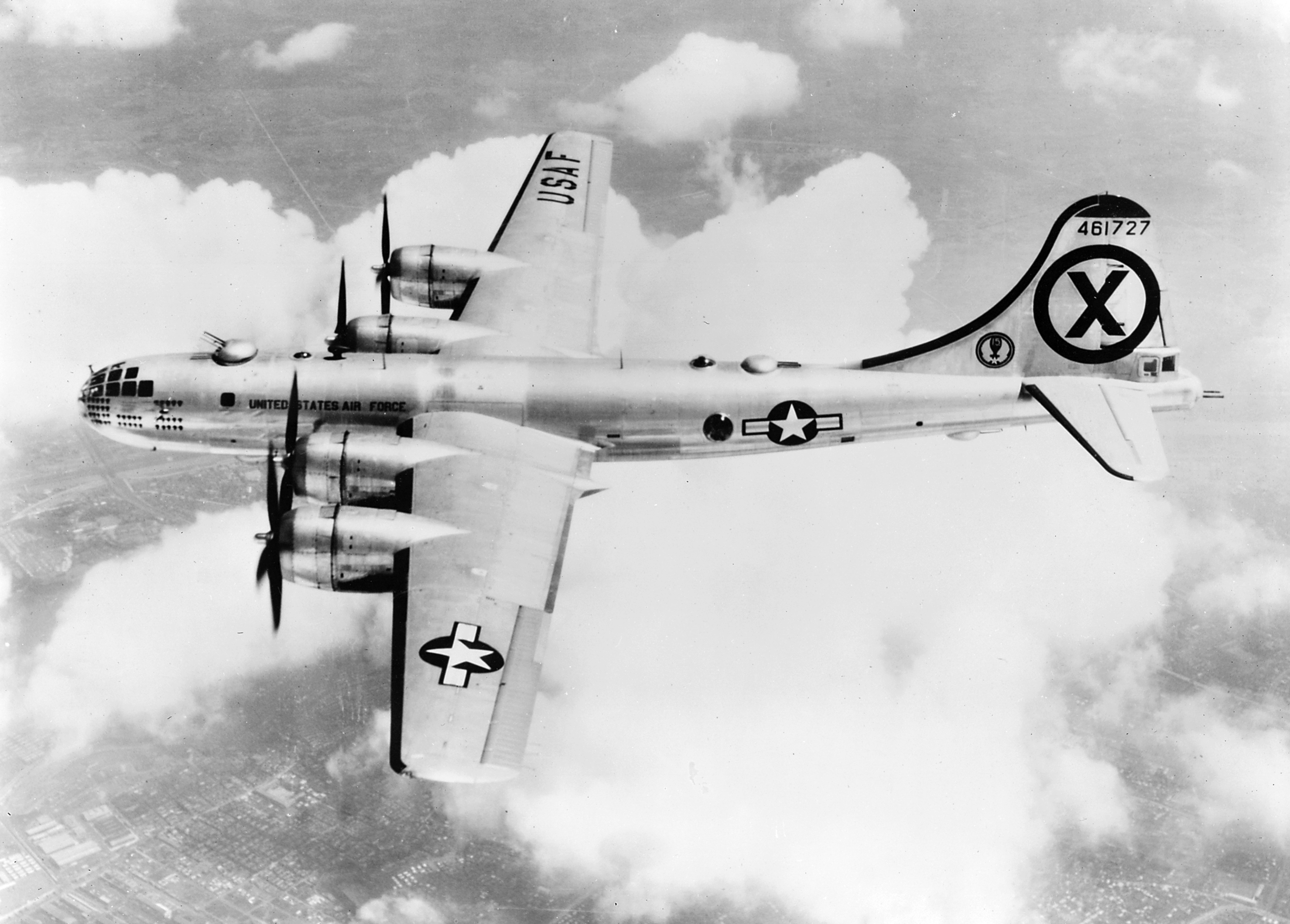
Boeing RB-29A Superfortress of the 91st Strategic Reconnaissance Squadron

The 91st Strategic Reconnaissance Wing was constituted 11 October 1948 and activated 10 November at McGuire Air Force Base, New Jersey as one of the first wings organized under the United States Air Force wing base reorganization (Hobson Plan). Under this plan, it was assigned the 91st Strategic Reconnaissance Group, which had been at McGuire for four months, as its operational element. The wing and group moved to Barksdale Air Force Base, Louisiana in 1949. RB-29J bombers were assigned to the wing and its primary mission was global strategic reconnaissance. The group was inactivated in June 1952 when Strategic Air Command converted to the Dual Deputate organization. Under this plan flying squadrons reported to the wing Deputy Commander for Operations and maintenance squadrons reported to the wing Deputy Commander for Maintenance. The squadrons had been attached to the wing and the group reduced to a paper unit in February 1951.

In 1950 the wing began receiving air refueling aircraft, first modified KB-29s, then the Boeing KC-97 Stratofreighter. In 1950, the 91st has redesignated the 91st Strategic Reconnaissance Wing, Medium. At Barksdale, its wing headquarters was integrated with that of the 301st Bombardment Wing from April 1950 to February 1951. Although each wing conducted independent tactical operations, both were commanded by the same headquarters. The wing detached components for up to three months, primarily to England, and maintained detachments from other units, to provide ongoing reconnaissance of overseas areas.

On 11 September 1951, the Wing' moved to Lockbourne Air Force Base, Ohio from Barksdale. The mission of the 91st SRW was to provide aerial reconnaissance and mapping services. It was equipped with aircraft fitted with cameras to perform this mission, including B/RB-45 and the B/YRB-47.

When the wing moved to Lockbourne, a detachment of the wing deployed to Yokota Air Base, Japan, performing combat reconnaissance for Far East Air Forces over the Korean Peninsula flying with RB-29 Superfortresses. Over North Korea, RB-29s were confronted daily by People's Liberation Army Air Force MiG-15s and were no longer able to perform reconnaissance, targeting, and bomb-damage assessment photography with impunity.

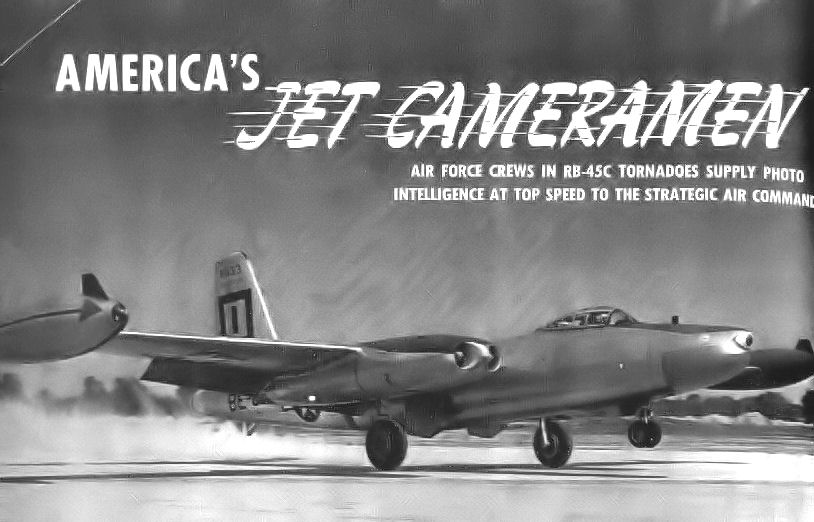
Cover of promotional pamphlet of the 91st SRW (Note: Caption was: "An RB-45C piloted by Col Joseph A. Preston, CO of the 91st Strategic Reconnaissance Wing, was first to land on the 2-mile (3.2 km) runway at Lockbourne Air Force Base". (Aircraft is RB-45C Tornado, serial 48-0033).)

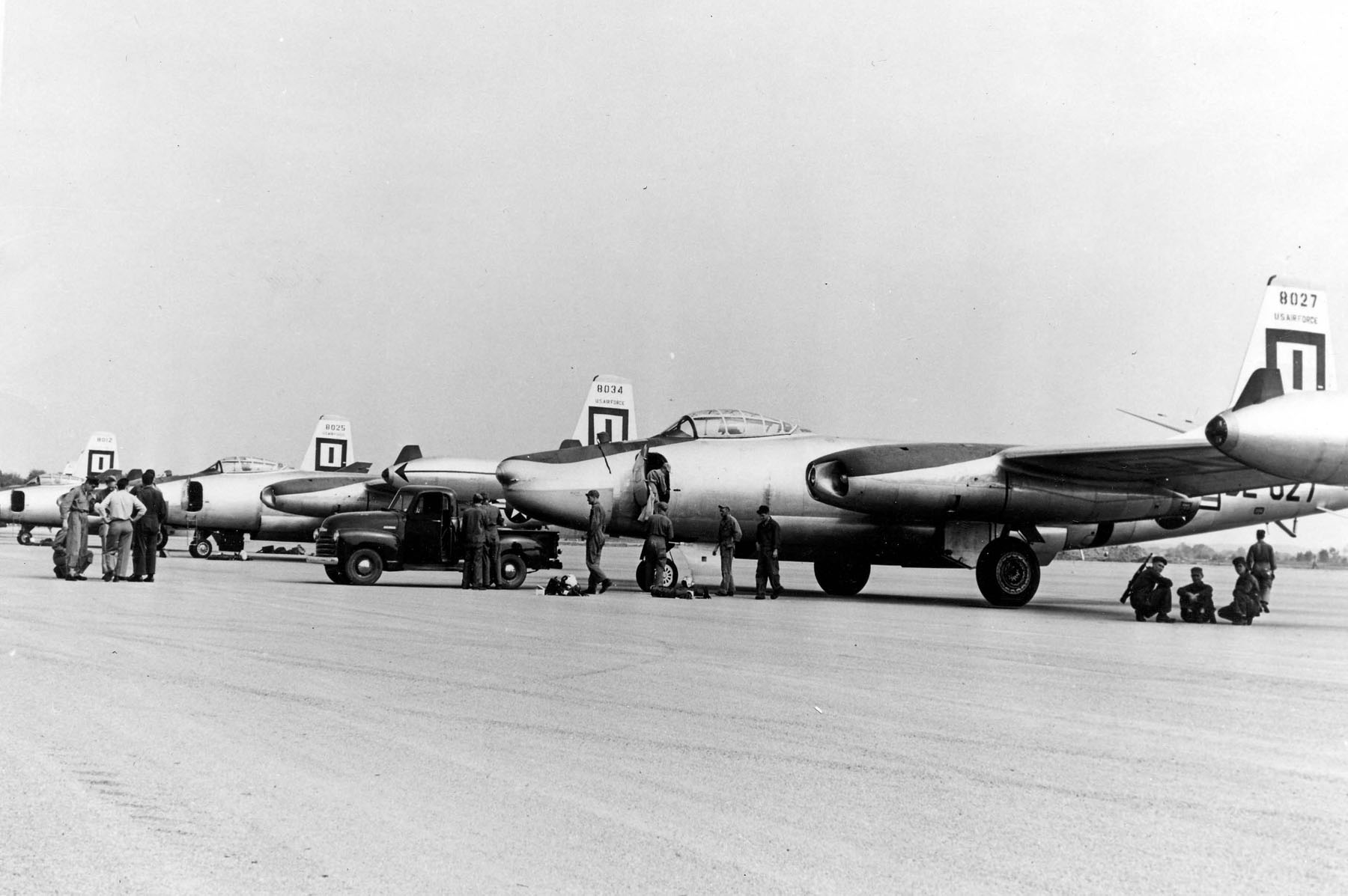
North American RB-45C Tornados of the 91st Strategic Recon Wing.

The RB-45C unit was attached to the 91st Strategic Reconnaissance Squadron and began flying reconnaissance missions over northwestern Korea. The RB-45Cs were able to evade the MiGs for several months, but on 9 April 1951 one of the RB-45Cs had a close call and was barely able to escape a numerically superior enemy. At that time, it was decided that RB-45s could no longer go into northwestern Korea without fighter escort. Another close call on 9 November 1951 caused the RB-45s to be restricted from entering northwestern Korean airspace in daylight even when fighter escort was available. In January 1952, the 91st Squadron was ordered to convert to night operations. Some RB-45Cs have painted all black so that they would not show up on enemy searchlights. However, the RB-45s were not well suited for night photography because the aircraft buffeted too badly when the forward bomb bay doors were opened to drop flash bombs. The RB-45s were withdrawn from the Korean theatre shortly thereafter, bringing the Korean experience with the RB-45 to an end.

On 29 July 1952, one of the wing's RB-45C commanded by Major Louis H. Carrington made the first nonstop trans-Pacific flight by a multi-engine jet aircraft. The aircraft flew from Elmendorf Air Force Base, Alaska to Yokota Air Base in Japan. Major Carrington refueled twice from KB-29s along the way. This feat earned the crew the 1952 Mackay Trophy for the most meritorious USAF flight of the year.

On 4 July 1952 an RB-29A Superfortress of the 91st Strategic Reconnaissance Squadron was shot down by MiGs, possibly over China or extreme northern Korea. Eleven out of the 13 aircrew became prisoners of war.

The wing won the SAC reconnaissance, photographic, and navigation competition and the P. T. Cullen Award in 1955 and 1956. From Aug to November 1956 most of the wing deployed overseas in detachments to North Africa, Newfoundland and Greenland. These detachments were not under the operational control of the small establishment remaining at Lockbourne.

The wing was inactivated in November 1957.

=== 91st Bombardment Wing ===
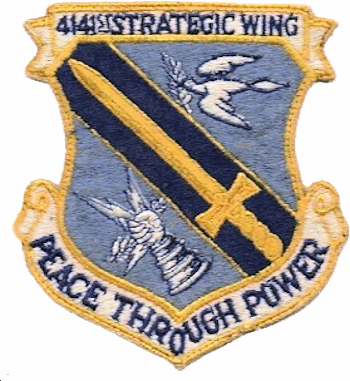
Patch with 4141st Strategic Wing emblem

4141st Strategic Wing

The origins of the wing as a bomber organization began on 1 September 1958 when Strategic Air Command (SAC) established the 4141st Strategic Wing (SW) at Glasgow Air Force Base, Montana. Glasgow was a World War II training airfield which had been reopened the previous year as an Air Defense Command base for interceptor aircraft of the 476th Fighter Group, which was the host unit at Glasgow. SAC assigned the wing to Fifteenth Air Force, and it was transferred to the 821st Air Division in July 1959, but remained a headquarters only until April 1960 when the increasing role of SAC at Glasgow in connection with SAC's plan to disperse its Boeing B-52 Stratofortress heavy bombers over a larger number of bases (making it more difficult for the Soviet Union to knock out the entire fleet with a surprise first strike) led to the transfer of the base to SAC. The 4141st became the host at Glasgow and was assigned the 4141st Combat Support Group and the 861st Medical Group to fulfil this mission.

The wing did not become an operational unit until 1961. In January the 68th Munitions Maintenance Squadron was activated to oversee the wing's special weapons. In April three maintenance squadrons were activated and the 326th Bombardment Squadron (BS), consisting of 15 Boeing B-52 Stratofortresses moved to Glasgow from Fairchild Air Force Base, Washington where it had been one of the three squadrons of the 92d Bombardment Wing. One third of the wing's aircraft were maintained on fifteen-minute alert, fully fueled, armed and ready for combat to reduce vulnerability to a Soviet missile strike. This was increased to half the wing's aircraft in 1962. The 4141st (and later the 91st) continued to maintain an alert commitment until inactivation except for periods when the wing deployed to support Operation Arc Light missions. On 1 July 1962 the wing was reassigned to the 810th Air Division (later the 810th Strategic Aerospace Division). However, SAC Strategic Wings could not carry a permanent history or lineage and SAC looked for a way to make its Strategic Wings permanent.

91st Bombardment Wing

In 1962, in order to perpetuate the lineage of many currently inactive bombardment units with illustrious World War II records, Headquarters SAC received authority from Headquarters USAF to discontinue its Major Command controlled (MAJCON) strategic wings that were equipped with combat aircraft and to activate Air Force controlled (AFCON) units, most of which were inactive at the time which could carry a lineage and history. As a result, the 4141st SW was replaced by the 91st Bombardment Wing, Heavy, which assumed its mission, personnel, and equipment on 1 February 1963. (Note: The 91st wing continued, through temporary bestowal, the history, and honors of the World War II 91st Bombardment Group. It was also entitled to retain the honors (but not the history or lineage) of the 4141st. This temporary bestowal continues to the present.) In the same way the 322d Bombardment Squadron, one of the unit's World War II historical bomb squadrons, replaced the 326th BS. The 861st Medical Group and the 68th Munitions Maintenance Squadron were reassigned to the 91st. Component support units were replaced by units with 91st numerical designation of the newly established wing. Each of the new units assumed the personnel, equipment, and mission of their predecessors. Four months later, the wing added an air refueling mission when the 907th Air Refueling Squadron, equipped with Boeing KC-135 Stratotankers was activated at Glasgow.

The 91st Bombardment Wing continued to conduct strategic bombardment training and air refueling operations to meet operational commitments of Strategic Air Command. From 11 September 1966 to 31 March 1967 the entire wing, except for a small rear echelon, was integrated into the Operation Arc Light force at Andersen Air Force Base, Guam for combat in Southeast Asia. From 5 February to 15 April 1968, the wing deployed to Kadena Air Base, Okinawa in response to the Pueblo Incident.

By 1968, Intercontinental ballistic missiles (ICBM) had been deployed and become operational as part of the United States' strategic triad, and the need for B-52s had been reduced. In addition, funds were also needed to cover the costs of combat operations in Indochina. The 91st Bombardment Wing became nonoperational in May 1968 when Glasgow was temporarily closed and the wing's component units were inactivated in July.

=== 91st Missile Wing ===
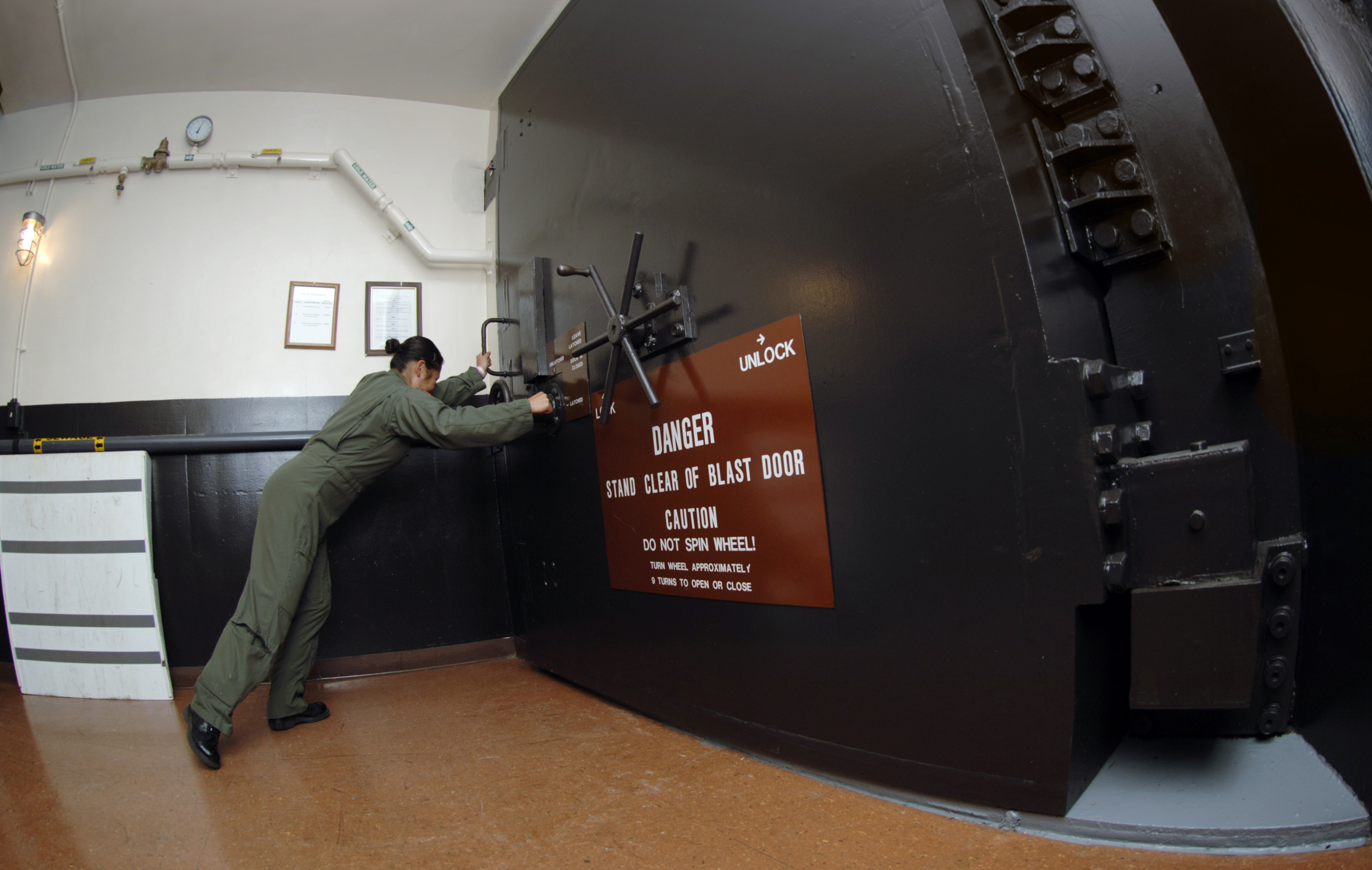
A missile crew member closing the blast door at Missile Alert Facility B-1, Minot AFB

On 25 June 1968, the wing moved to Minot Air Force Base, North Dakota. There it was redesignated the 91st Strategic Missile Wing and absorbed the mission, personnel, and LGM-30A Minuteman I missiles of the inactivating 455th Strategic Missile Wing. There it maintained its strategic missiles in a state of operational readiness,

The first LGM-30G Minuteman III missile to arrive in the field was accepted by the 91st Strategic Missile Wing on 14 April 1970. The following August, the first Minutemen IIIs were placed on alert status. By December 1971, the switchover to the new missile was completed. With the inactivation of SAC in 1992, the wing became part of Air Combat Command.

The wing was a five-time winner of the Blanchard Trophy awarded by SAC and later Air Force Space Command for the winner of the combat missile competition. It also won the Lee R. Williams Memorial Missile Trophy five times as the command's best missile wing and the Thomas S. Moorman Trophy as Space Command's outstanding wing in 1996.

On 1 July 1994, along with other missile units, the wing was transferred to AF Space Command. On 1 October 1997, it was redesignated as the 91st Space Wing. On 1 July 2008, it was once again designated the 91st Missile Wing. Along with Twentieth Air Force, the wing transferred from Air Force Space Command to Air Force Global Strike Command in December 2009.

In 2009 two missile officers, were charged with stealing classified missile launch technology. The classified material- a device used to detect equipment tampering in the launch facility, was taken in July 2005. The theft came to light in May 2008. The officers were allowed to resign from the Air Force in lieu of facing courts martial.

On 14 October 2009 the wing commander, as well as the 91st Maintenance Group commander, and 91st Missile Maintenance Squadron commander, were relieved of command by the commander of Twentieth Air Force for loss of confidence in their ability to command. The reliefs followed incidents including the crash of a truck carrying missile components on 31 August 2009, a similar truck crash in July 2008, and a failed wing nuclear surety inspection. Colonel Ferdinand Stoss was named the new wing commander; he had previously been serving as vice commander of the 90th Missile Wing at F.E. Warren Air Force Base in Wyoming. (Note: The misconduct by wing members included three officers who fell asleep on duty in July 2008 while in possession of classified components containing out-of-date missile launch codes for Minuteman III ICBMs and an airman who left a safe containing missile operation procedures unsecured for an entire night. Hoffman, Michael, "Wing commander, 2 others fired at Minot", Military Times, 15 October 2009.)

In May 2013, press reports indicated that the wing had been rated "marginal" when tested on Minuteman III launch operations. A USAF spokesperson characterized this as the equivalent of a "D" grade in school. Lt. Col. Jay Folds, deputy commander of the 91st Operations Group described the unit as "in a crisis." Seventeen missile launch officers were removed from duty as a result of their performance in this evaluation. In addition, another officer faced potential disciplinary action for intentionally violating nuclear safety rules that had the potential to compromise launch codes for the wing's missiles.

== Lineage ==
- Constituted as 91st Strategic Reconnaissance Wing on 11 October 1948

Activated on 10 November 1948
Redesignated 91st Strategic Reconnaissance Wing, Medium on 6 July 1950
Inactivated on 8 November 1957

- Redesignated 91st Bombardment Wing, Heavy on 15 November 1962 and activated (not organized)

Organized on 1 February 1963
Redesignated: 91st Strategic Missile Wing on 25 June 1968
Redesignated: 91st Missile Wing on 1 September 1991
Redesignated: 91st Missile Group on 1 July 1994
Redesignated: 91st Missile Wing on 1 February 1996
Redesignated: 91st Space Wing on 1 October 1997
Redesignated: 91st Missile Wing on 1 July 2008

=== Assignments ===
- 311th Air Division, 10 November 1948
- Second Air Force, 1 November 1949
- 4th Air Division, 10 February 1951
- Second Air Force, 11 September 1951
- 37th Air Division, 10 October 1951 (attached to Second Air Force, 10 October 1951 – 17 March 1952)
- 801st Air Division 28 May 1952 – 8 November 1957
- Strategic Air Command, 15 November 1962 (not organized)
- 810th Strategic Aerospace Division, 1 February 1963
- 18th Strategic Aerospace Division, 1 July 1963
- 821st Strategic Aerospace Division, 1 September 1964
- 810th Strategic Aerospace Division, 1 July 1966 (attached to Advanced Echelon, 3d Air Division, c. 5 February-15 April 1968)
- 4th Strategic Missile Division, 30 June 1971
- Fifteenth Air Force, 30 November 1972 (attached to Air Division Provisional, 810, 30 November 1972 – 14 January 1973)
- 47th Air Division, 15 January 1973
- 57th Air Division, 22 January 1975
- Fifteenth Air Force, 14 June 1991
- Twentieth Air Force, 1 September 1991

=== Components ===
Groups

- 91st Air Base Group (later 91st Combat Support Group): 10 November 1948 – 28 May 1952, 1 February 1963 – 25 June 1968, 1 August 1972 – 22 June 1988
- 91st Maintenance & Supply Group (later 91st Maintenance Group, 91st Logistics Group, 91st Maintenance Group): 20 November 1948 – 10 February 1951, 14 February 1952 – 28 May 1952, 1 September 1991 – 1 July 1994, c. 1 February 1996 – present
- 91st Security Police Group (later 91st Missile Security Group, 91st Security Forces Group): 1 October 1973 – c. 1 July 1994, c. 2003–present
- 91st Station Medical Group (later 91st Medical Group, 91st Medical Squadron, 91st Medical Group, 91st Tactical Hospital): 10 November 1948 – 8 November 1957
- 91st Strategic Reconnaissance Group (later, 91st Operations Group): 10 November 1948 – 28 May 1952; 1 September 1991 – 1 July 1994; 1 February 1996 – present.
- 861st Medical Group: 1 February 1963 – 25 June 1968
- 4091st Operations Group: 1 July 1988 – 14 February 1991

Assigned Operational Squadrons

- 91st Air Refueling Squadron: 28 May 1952 – 8 November 1957
- 322d Strategic Reconnaissance Squadron (later, 322d Bombardment Squadron): 28 May 1952 – 8 November 1957; 1 February 1963 – 25 June 1968
- 323d Strategic Reconnaissance Squadron: assigned 28 May 1952 – 8 November 1957 (detached to 55th Strategic Reconnaissance Wing 19 September 1949 – 10 October 1949, to unknown 12 January 1954 – 26 February 1954)
- 324th Strategic Reconnaissance Squadron: 28 May 1952 – 8 November 1957
- 740th Strategic Missile (later, 740th Missile) Squadron: 25 June 1968 – 1 July 1988; 14 February-1 September 1991; 1 July 1994 – 1 February 1996
- 741st Strategic Missile (later, 741st Missile) Squadron: 25 June 1968 – 1 July 1988; 14 February-1 September 1991; 1 July 1994 – 1 February 1996
- 742d Strategic Missile (later, 742d Missile) Squadron: 25 June 1968 – 1 July 1988; 14 February-1 September 1991; 1 July 1994 – 1 February 1996
- 907th Air Refueling Squadron: 1 July 1963 – 25 June 1968

Attached Operational Squadrons

- 16th Photographic Reconnaissance Squadron (Special): 10 November 1948 – 1 June 1949
- 26th Air Refueling Squadron: 28 May 1952 – 1 June 1953
- 38th Reconnaissance Squadron: 1 November 1950 – 5 January 1951
- 68th Air Refueling Squadron: 5 May 1952 – 28 May 1952
- 91st Reconnaissance Squadron (later 91st Strategic Reconnaissance Squadron): 22 January 1949 – 25 March 1949
- 100th Air Refueling Squadron: 23 May 1953 – 24 November 1953
- 338th Strategic Reconnaissance Squadron: 1 November 1950 – 24 November 1950
- 343d Strategic Reconnaissance Squadron: 1 November 1950 – 3 January 1951

Maintenance Squadrons

- 91st Armament & Electronics Maintenance Squadron (later 91st Avionics Maintenance Squadron): 28 May 1952 – 8 November 1957, 1 February 1963 – 25 June 1968
- 91st Maintenance Squadron (later 91st Field Maintenance Squadron, 91st Maintenance Squadron, 91st Missile Maintenance Squadron): 10 February 1951 – 12 February 1952, 28 May 1952 – 8 November 1957, 1 February 1963 – 25 June 1968, c. 1 July 1994 – present
- 91st Missile Maintenance Squadron (later 91st Field Missile Maintenance Squadron): 1 July 1963 – 30 September 1975, 30 September 1975 – c. 1 July 1994
- 91st Periodic Maintenance Squadron (later 91st Organizational Maintenance Squadron, 91st Organizational Missile Maintenance Squadron): 28 May 1952 – 8 November 1957, 1 February 1963 – 25 June 1968, 30 September 1975 – c. 1 July 1994
- 4211th Armament & Electronics Maintenance Squadron: 10 February 1951 – 28 May 1952
- 4211th Organizational Maintenance Squadron: 10 February 1951 – 28 May 1952

Other

- USAF Regional Hospital, Minot: 1 August 1972 – 22 June 1988

=== Stations ===
- McGuire Air Force Base, New Jersey, 10 November 1948
- Barksdale Air Force Base, Louisiana, 1 October 1949
- Lockbourne Air Force Base, Ohio, 11 September 1951 – 8 November 1957
- Glasgow Air Force Base, Montana, 1 February 1963
- Minot Air Force Base, North Dakota, since 25 June 1968

=== Aircraft and missiles ===
- Boeing B-17G Flying Fortress (Includes TRB-17; RB-17), 1948–1950
- Boeing B-29 Superfortress (Includes KB, TRB, TB and RB-29), 1948–1953
- Boeing B-50 Superfortress (Includes RB-50), 1949–1951
- North American B-45 Tornado (Includes RB-45), 1950–1953
- Boeing KC-97 Stratofreighter, 1952–1957
- Boeing B-47E Stratojet, 1953
- Boeing RB-47E Stratojet, 1953–1957
- Boeing B-52D Stratofortress, 1963–1968
- Boeing KC-135 Stratotanker, 1963–1968
- LGM-30A Minuteman I, 1968–1972
- LGM-30G Minuteman III, 1972 – present

=== Awards ===
- In addition to the awards earned by the wing it is also authorized through temporary bestowal the awards and campaign credits earned by the 91st Operations Group before 10 November 1948

Award streamer	Award	Dates	Notes
	Air Force Outstanding Unit Award	8 September 1953 – 8 November 1957	91st Strategic Reconnaissance Wing
	Air Force Outstanding Unit Award	1 July 1965 – 30 June 1966	91st Bombardment Wing
	Air Force Outstanding Unit Award	1 July 1966 – 30 June 1967	91st Bombardment Wing
	Air Force Outstanding Unit Award	1 February 1968 – 1 March 1968	91st Bombardment Wing
	Air Force Outstanding Unit Award	2 March 1968 – 15 April 1968	91st Bombardment Wing
	Air Force Outstanding Unit Award	1 July 1972 – 30 June 1973	91st Strategic Missile Wing
	Air Force Outstanding Unit Award	1 July 1976 – 30 June 1978	91st Strategic Missile Wing
	Air Force Outstanding Unit Award	1 July 1978 – 30 June 1980	91st Strategic Missile Wing
	Air Force Outstanding Unit Award	1 September 1993 – 30 August 1995	91st Missile Wing (later 91st Missile Group)
	Air Force Outstanding Unit Award	1 September 1995 – 31 August 1997	91st Missile Group (later 91st Missile Wing)
	Air Force Outstanding Unit Award	1 October 1998 – 30 September 2000	91st Space Wing
	Air Force Outstanding Unit Award	1 October 2000 – 1 October 2001	91st Space Wing
	Air Force Outstanding Unit Award	1 January 2002 – 31 December 2002	91st Space Wing
