= 907th Air Refueling Squadron =

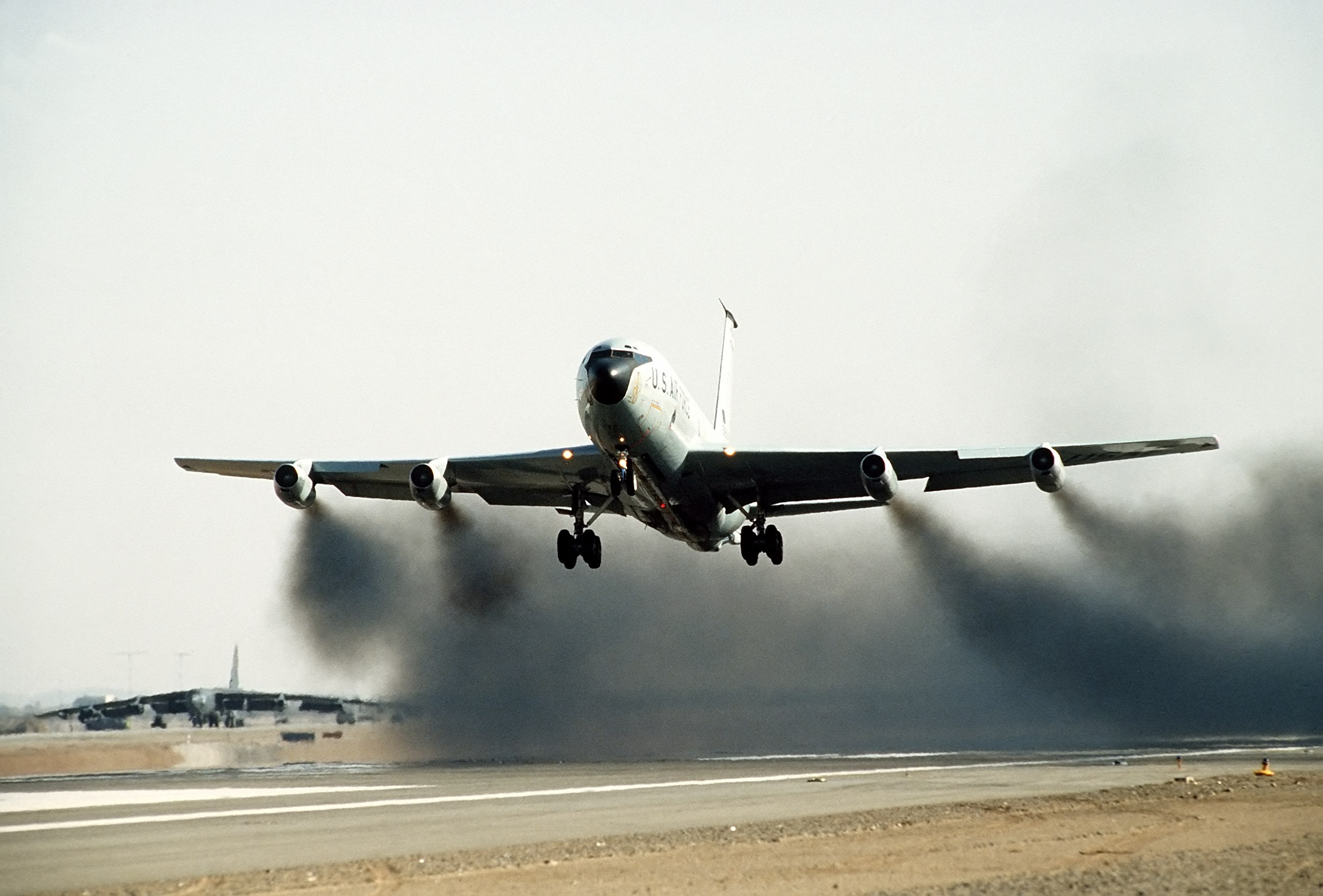
- Boeing KC-135 Stratotanker taking off using water injection to increase thrust
- Active: 1942–1945; 1963–1968
- Country: United States
- Branch: United States Air Force
- Role: Air refueling
- Nickname: Hump T Dumps (CBI Theater)
- Engagements: China Burma India Theater

Insignia
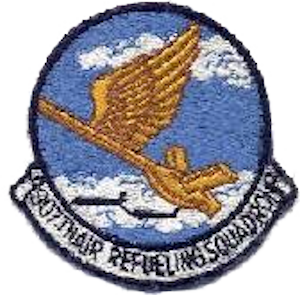
- Patch with 907th Air Refueling Squadron emblem

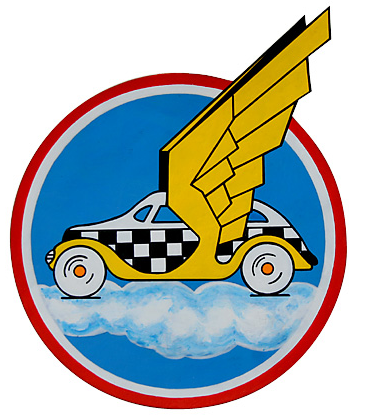
- 27th Troop Carrier Squadron emblem (Note: Approved 25 February 1943. Description: Over and through a light blue disc, border red, piped white, a black and white checkered taxicab, winged gold, resting on a white cloud formation in base.)

The 907th Air Refueling Squadron is an inactive United States Air Force unit. It was last assigned to the 91st Bombardment Wing at Glasgow Air Force Base, Montana, and was inactivated on 25 June 1968. From 1963 to 1968 the squadron served as the air refueling element of its parent wing.

The first predecessor of the squadron was the 27th Troop Carrier Squadron, a World War II troop carrier squadron that served in the China Burma India Theater as an airlift unit. Its last assignment was with the 443d Troop Carrier Group at Liangshan, China, where it was inactivated on 27 December 1945.

The two squadrons were consolidated into a single unit in 1985, but the consolidated unit has not been active since.

== History ==
=== World War II ===
==== Training unit in the United States ====
The 27th Transport Squadron was activated at Daniel Field, Georgia in February 1942 as one of the original five squadrons of the 89th Transport Group. The squadron was initially equipped with Douglas DC-3 transports (impressed into military service as C-48s and C-49s) and Douglas C-53 Skytroopers to conduct transition training for pilots who had no previous experience in Douglas transports. In June 1942, the squadron moved to Kellogg Field, Michigan and was soon reassigned to the 10th Transport Group, but attached to the 62d Troop Carrier Group. It retained its C-53s, but its mission changed as it became a Replacement Training Unit. Replacement Training Units were oversized units that trained individual pilots or aircrews

In July 1942 the squadron and its parent group were redesignated as Troop Carrier units. In early August 1942, he squadron was relieved of its attachment to the 62d Group and moved to Bowman Field, Kentucky. At Bowman, the squadron standardized on the Douglas C-47 Skytrain, although it retained some C-53s into 1943. In November 1943 the replacement training mission terminated and the 27th prepared for transfer overseas to the China Burma India Theater.

==== Combat in India and China ====
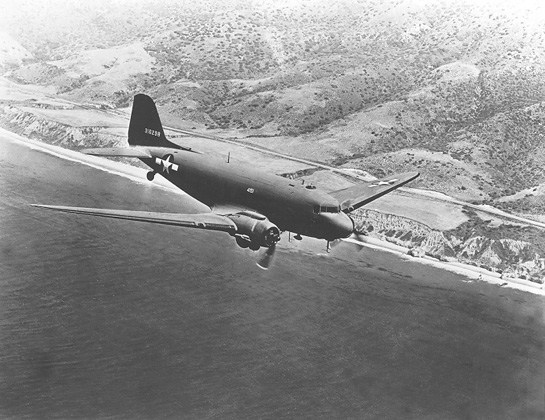
C-47 as flown by the squadron during World War II

The air echelon of the squadron gathered at Baer Field, Indiana, where it received new aircraft. It ferried the airplanes to India via the South Atlantic ferry route, leaving Morrison Field, Florida in December and arriving in India in January. The ground echelon did not arrive in theater until late March

The squadron flew airlift missions and evacuated wounded personnel, sometimes landing on unimproved airstrips. It participated in Operation Thursday, the transport of troops behind enemy lines in Burma, along with aircraft of the 1st Air Commando Group. After moving to China, the squadron supported Office of Strategic Services missions in China and Southeast Asia. The squadron remained in China after the termination of hostilities in August 1945 and was inactivated there in December.

=== Cold War ===
The 907th Air Refueling Squadron was organized in July 1963 by Strategic Air Command at Glasgow Air Force Base, however its first Boeing KC-135 Stratotanker did not arrive until October and it was December before the squadron became combat ready. The squadron mission was to provide air refueling support to the Boeing B-52 Stratofortress strategic bombers of its parent 91st Bombardment Wing and other USAF units as directed, including supporting Operation Chrome Dome airborne alert sorties. The squadron kept half its aircraft on fifteen-minute alert, fully fueled and ready for combat to reduce vulnerability to a Soviet missile strike until it became nonoperational in 1968, except for periods when it deployed its aircraft and aircrews to support operations in the Pacific.

The 907th deployed to the Western Pacific region to support Operation Arc Light from September 1966 to March 1967 and to Okinawa from February to March 1968 during the Pueblo Crisis. It also deployed to Southeast Asia to support Operation Young Tiger, refueling tactical aircraft on strike missions.

The squadron became non-operational in May 1968 and was inactivated in June when Glasgow closed.

The 27th Troop Carrier Squadron and the 907th Air Refueling Squadron were consolidated in 1985, but the consolidated unit has not been active.

== Lineage ==
27th Troop Carrier Squadron

- Constituted as the 27th Transport Squadron on 19 January 1942

Activated on 1 February 1942
Redesignated 27th Troop Carrier Squadron on 4 July 1942
Inactivated on 27 December 1945
Consolidated on 19 September 1985 with the 907th Air Refueling Squadron as the 907th Air Refueling Squadron

907th Air Refueling Squadron

- Constituted as the 907th Air Refueling Squadron, Heavy on 20 March 1963 and activated (not organized)

Organized on 1 July 1963
Discontinued and inactivated on 25 June 1968
Consolidated on 19 September 1985 with the 27th Troop Carrier Squadron (remained inactive)

=== Assignments ===
- 89th Transport Group, 1 February 1942
- 10th Transport Group (later 10th Troop Carrier Group), 15 June 1942 (attached to 62d Transport Group (later 62d Troop Carrier Group), 21 June 1942 – 5 August 1942)
- Tenth Air Force, 12 January 1944 (attached to Troop Carrier Command, Eastern Air Command)
- 443d Troop Carrier Group, 6 March 1944 – 27 December 1945 (attached to 69th Composite Wing, 21 May 1944 – c. July 1945)
- 91st Bombardment Wing, 1 July 1963 – 25 June 1968 (detached c. 11 September 1966 – c. 31 March 1967 and c. 5 February 1968 – c. 16 March 1968, not operational after c. 1 May 1968)

=== Stations ===
- Daniel Field, Georgia, 1 February 1942
- Harding Field, Louisiana, 10 March 1942
- Kellogg Field, Michigan, 21 June 1942
- Bowman Field, Kentucky, 5 August 1942
- Pope Field, North Carolina, 4 October 1942
- Lawson Field, Georgia, 2 December 1942
- Dunnellon Army Air Field, Florida, 14 February 1943 – 13 December 1943
- Sylhet, India, 12 January 1944
- Yunnani, China, 21 May 1944 (detachments operated from Zhanyi, Chengdu, and Kunming at various times)
- Chenggong, China, 15 February 1945
- Liangshan, China, 13 August 1945 – 27 December 1945
- Glasgow Air Force Base, Montana, 1 July 1963 – 25 June 1968

=== Aircraft ===
- Douglas C-47 Skytrain, 1942–1945
- Douglas C-48, 1942
- Douglas C-49, 1942
- Douglas C-53 Skytrooper, 1942–1943
- Boeing KC-135A Stratotanker, 1963–1968

=== Campaigns ===
Campaign/Service Streamer	Campaign	Dates	Notes
	American Theater	1 February 1942 – 13 December 1943	27th Transport Squadron (later Troop Carrier Squadron)
	India-Burma	12 January 1944 – 28 January 1945	27th Troop Carrier Squadron
	China Defensive	12 January 1944 – 4 May 1945	27th Troop Carrier Squadron
	China Offensive	5 May 1945 – 2 September 1945	27th Troop Carrier Squadron

== See also ==
- List of United States Air Force air refueling squadrons
