= La Neuville-d'Aumont =

- Part of La Drenne
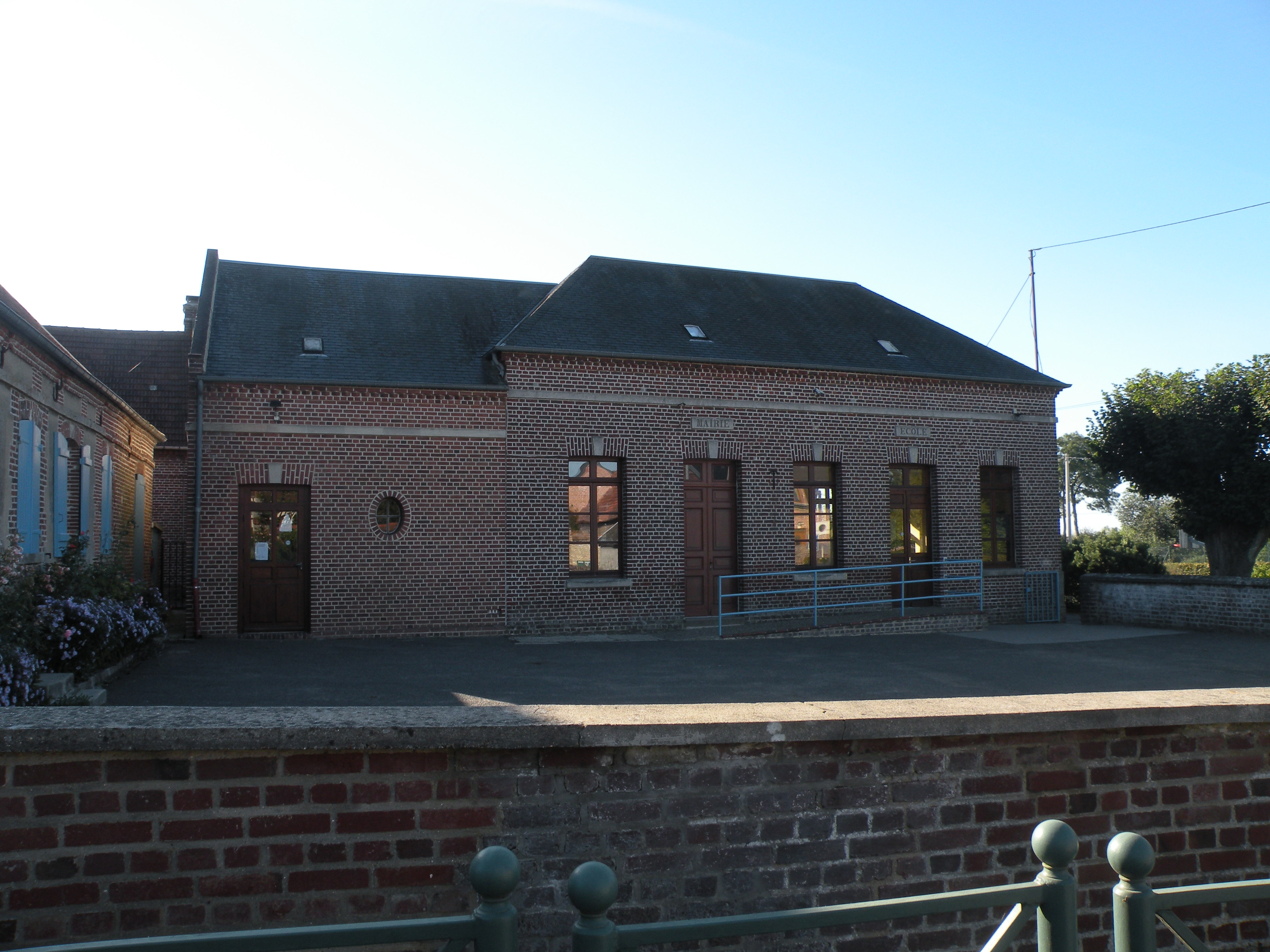
- Town hall
- Location of La Neuville-d'Aumont
- Location within France Location within Hauts-de-France
- Coordinates: 49°18′36″N 2°05′59″E
- Country: France
- Region: Hauts-de-France
- Department: Oise
- Arrondissement: Beauvais
- Canton: Chaumont-en-Vexin
- Commune: La Drenne
- Area^{1}: 4.75 km^{2} (1.83 sq mi)
- Elevation: 220 m (720 ft)
- Highest elevation: 232 m (761 ft)
- Lowest elevation: 150 m (490 ft)
- Population (2022): 348
  - Density: 73.3/km^{2} (190/sq mi)
- Time zone: UTC+01:00 (CET)
  - Summer (DST): UTC+02:00 (CEST)
- Postal code: 60790
- ^{1} French Land Register data, which excludes lakes, ponds, glaciers > 1 km^{2} (0.386 sq mi or 247 acres) and river estuaries.

La Neuville-d'Aumont (French pronunciation: [la nøvil domɔ̃]) is a former commune in the Oise department in northern France. On 1 January 2017, it was merged into the new commune La Drenne.

== See also ==
- Communes of the Oise department
