= Poix =

Poix may refer to:

== People ==
- Duke of Poix, title in the peerage of France
- Gabriel Poix (1888–1946), French rower
- Vincent P. de Poix (1916–2015), American vice admiral

== Communes in France ==
- Poix, Marne, Grand Est
- Poix-Terron, Ardennes department, Grand Est
- Poix-de-Picardie, Somme department, Hauts-de-France
- Poix-du-Nord, Nord department, Hauts-de-France
- Saint-Poix, Mayenne department, Pays de la Loire
