= Nine-O-Nine =

Boeing B-17G Flying Fortress bomber

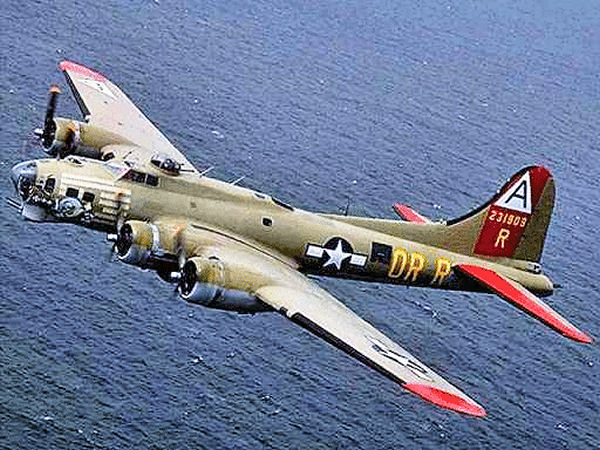
- The Collings Foundation B-17G flying in the colours of Nine-O-Nine, 323rd BS B-17G, displaying 1st Combat Bomb Wing tail markings. This aircraft crashed in 2019.

General information
- Type: Boeing B-17G-30-BO Flying Fortress
- Manufacturer: Boeing Airplane Company
- Owners: 91st Bombardment Group USAAF
- Construction number: 7023
- Serial: 42-31909
- Total hours: 1,129 hours

History
- Manufactured: December 15, 1943
- In service: December 15, 1943–December 7, 1945

Nine-O-Nine was a Boeing B-17G-30-BO Flying Fortress heavy bomber, of the 323d Bombardment Squadron, 91st Bombardment Group, that completed 140 combat missions during World War II, believed to be the Eighth Air Force record for most missions without loss to the crews that flew it. (Note: Other B-17s may have completed more total missions; see for example "Ole Gappy" as mentioned in article RAF Kimbolton.) A different B-17G, painted to mimic the Nine-O-Nine, crashed at Bradley International Airport in Windsor Locks, Connecticut, in October 2019.

== Service history ==
The original aircraft, from a group of 30 B-17Gs manufactured by Boeing, was nicknamed after the last three digits of its serial number: 42-31909. Nine-O-Nine was added to the USAAF inventory on December 15, 1943, and flown overseas on February 5, 1944. After depot modifications, it was delivered to the 91st BG at RAF Bassingbourn, England, on February 24, 1944, as a replacement aircraft, one of the last B-17s received in factory-applied camouflage paint.

A former navigator of the 91st BG, Marion Havelaar, reported in his history of the group that Nine-O-Nine completed either 126 or 132 consecutive missions without aborting for mechanical reasons, also believed to be a record. M/Sgt. Rollin L. Davis, maintenance line chief of the bomber, received the Bronze Star for his role in achieving the record.

The aircraft's first use in a bombing raid was over Augsburg, Germany, on February 25, 1944. It was used for 18 bombing raids on Berlin. In all, it was flown 1,129 hours and dropped 562,000 pounds (251 long tons; 255,000 kg) of bombs. It had 21 engine changes, four wing panel changes, 15 main gas tank changes, and 18 changes of "Tokyo tanks" (long-range fuel tanks).

Nine-O-Nine was returned to the United States after the end of the war in Europe, on June 8, 1945. It was sent to the Reconstruction Finance Corporation facility at Kingman, Arizona, on December 7, 1945, and eventually scrapped.

== Collings Foundation Nine-O-Nine ==
The Collings Foundation of Stow, Massachusetts, flew a different B-17G painted as a "tribute ship" to honor the original Nine-O-Nine at airshows and for "living history" flights, from 1986 until October 2019.

=== Military history ===
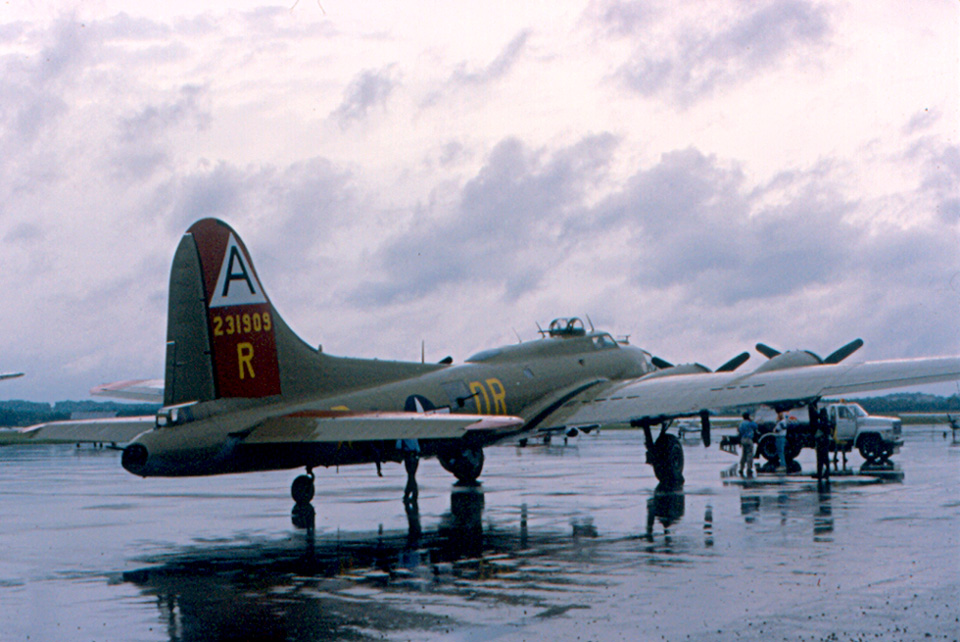
Collings Foundation's Nine-O-Nine, in Manassas, Virginia, on August 27, 1992

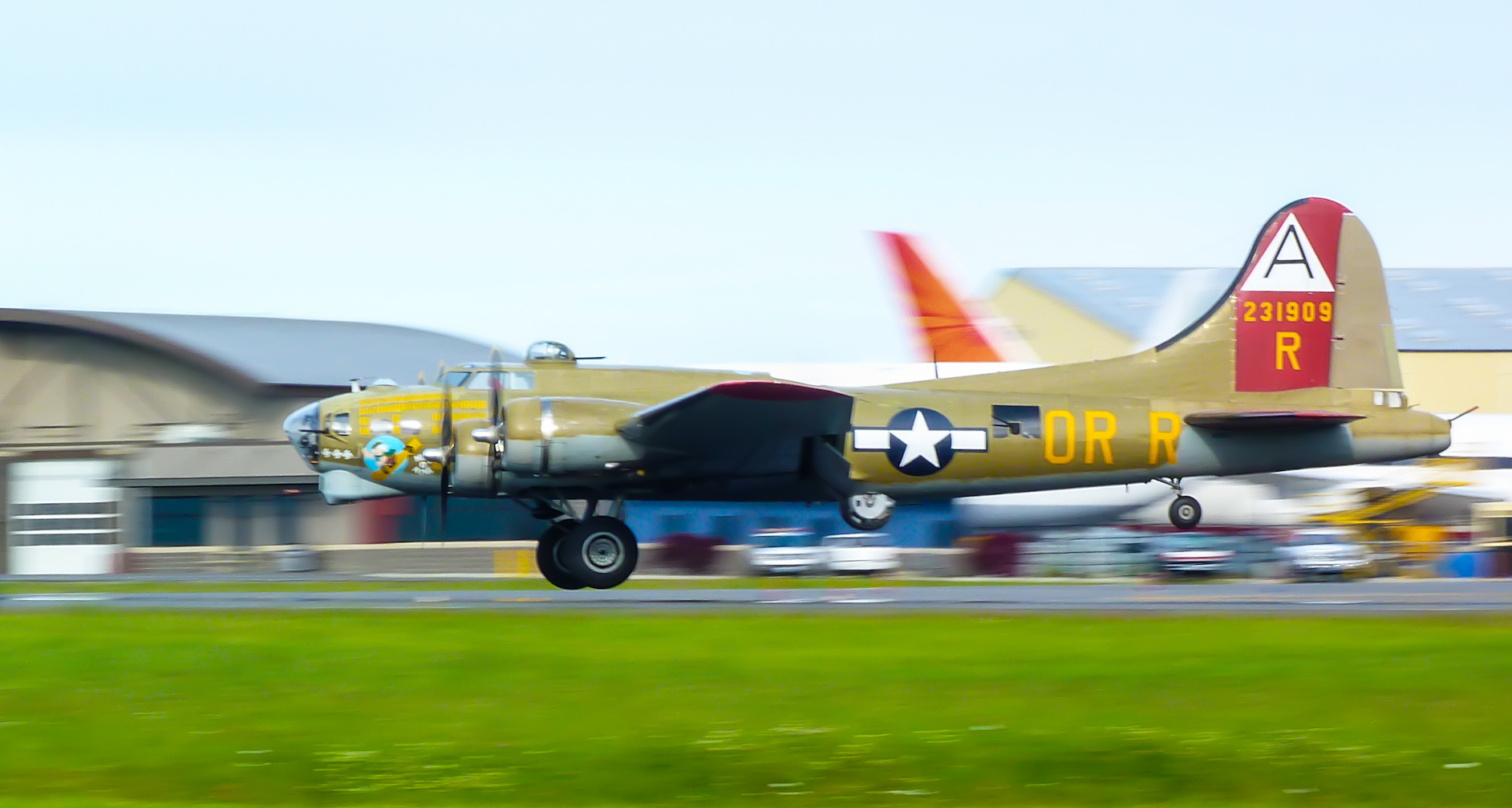
Collings Foundation's Nine-O-Nine coming in to land at Paine Field, Washington State, on June 15, 2012

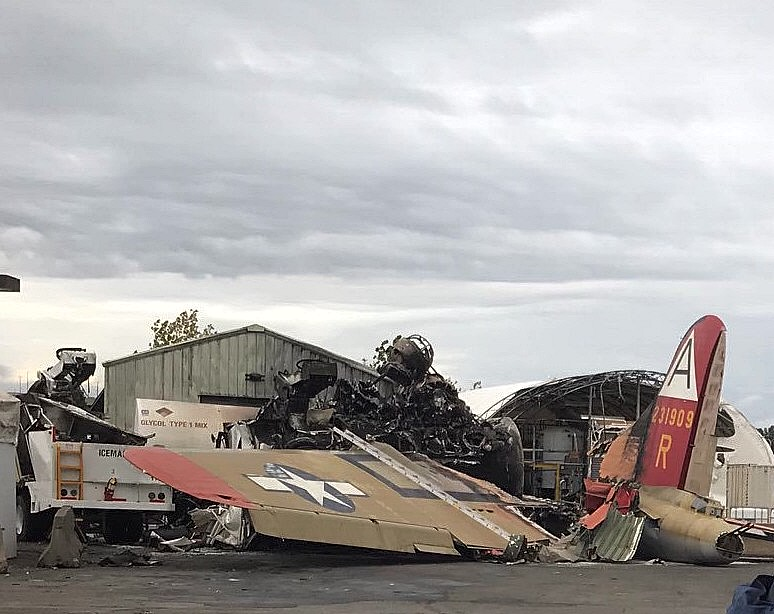
Collings Foundation's Nine-O-Nine after its October 2019 crash

Flying Fortress 44-83575 (variant B-17G-85-DL) was built by the Douglas Aircraft Company in Long Beach, California, and was accepted by the military on April 7, 1945. Arriving too late for use in combat, 44-83575 operated as an Air-Sea Rescue aircraft until 1952, when it was reassigned to the Air Force Special Weapons Command for use as a specimen in weapons-effects testing. In this role, it was subjected to three nuclear explosions as part of Operation Tumbler–Snapper. After a 13-year "cool down" period, the plane was sold for scrap, for a price of US$269 (equivalent to $2,684 in 2024).

=== Civilian history ===
As 44-83575 was in relatively good condition, it was restored by Aircraft Specialties Company to airworthy condition for use as a water bomber over the course of ten years, entering service in 1977, until its operator's liquidation in 1985.

The Collings Foundation purchased the aircraft in January 1986, and its subsequent restoration to wartime configuration by Tom Reilly Vintage Aircraft won several awards. Carrying civil registration N93012, the plane was painted as Nine-O-Nine (including "231909" on the tail) and appeared at many airshows. It was featured in a 2019 episode of Museum Access, which included a detailed tour of its interior and video of the aircraft in flight; an "NL93012" placard can be seen on the instrument panel and "231909" on its tail.

==== Incidents ====
On August 23, 1987, N93012 was caught by crosswinds during a landing at Beaver County Airport near Pittsburgh. Landing too far down the runway, the plane rolled off the end of runway, crashed through a fence and power pole, and came to rest down a 100-foot (30 m) ravine. Landing gear, chin and ball turrets, bomb bay doors, Plexiglass nose, nacelles, wings, and fuselage all sustained damage. There were no fatalities, however three of the twelve people on board were injured. Repair work by volunteers and Air Heritage Aircraft Restoration Inc., supported by donations, brought N93012 back to airworthy condition.

On July 9, 1995, N93012 was again damaged, this time near Norfolk, Nebraska, when its landing gear would not fully deploy and it was forced to make an emergency landing, causing some damage to the fuselage and at least one propeller.

On the morning of October 2, 2019, N93012 crashed at Bradley International Airport in Windsor Locks, Connecticut, while attempting to return shortly after takeoff. The aircraft was destroyed in the crash, and seven of the thirteen people on board were killed.

The National Transportation Safety Board (NTSB) launched an investigation, and in April 2021 released a report citing pilot error as the likely cause, with inadequate maintenance as a contributing factor.
