= Bert Stiles =

American World War II pilot (1920–1944)

- Born: August 30, 1920; Denver, Colorado
- Died: November 26, 1944 (aged 24) near Hanover, Germany
- Occupations: Writer and journalist
- Writing career
- Notable work: Serenade to the Big Bird

Bert Stiles (August 30, 1920 – November 26, 1944) was an American author of short stories who was killed in action during World War II while serving as a bomber co-pilot in the US Army Air Forces.

== Youth ==
Born in Denver, Colorado he was the son of an electrician, Bert Stiles Sr, and a music teacher, Elizabeth Huddleston Stiles. He was raised at 1245 South York Street in the Washington Park neighborhood of Denver and attended Denver's South High School. He worked summers as a junior forest ranger in Estes Park. His childhood home and experience as a junior forest ranger became sources of material for his short stories.

After graduation from high school in 1938 he entered Colorado College, with a pronounced interest in writing both stories and poetry. He became a feature writer for the campus newspaper, The Tiger, expressing pacifist views in vogue at the time, and in June 1941, isolated himself in his fraternity house and produced twenty-seven short stories.

Stiles mailed samples of his prose to Ruth and Max Aley, literary agents in New York City, who expressed an interest in seeing more. Stiles left college to hitchhike to New York; he was stopped twice by police and sent home twice, but eventually reached New York and delivered his stories in person. The Aleys employed him as a handyman and provided him living space on their farm in Connecticut in order to mentor him in his writing. Stiles wrote ten hours a day throughout the summer of 1941 and his diligence was rewarded when his first story was accepted in September by The Saturday Evening Post, which eventually published "The Ranger" series of stories based on his experiences in Estes Park. He also sold stories to Liberty and The American magazines.

== USAAF service ==
Stiles enlisted in the United States Army in January 1943, becoming an aviation cadet, and was commissioned a second lieutenant in the Air Corps, in November. He won pilots wings and was assigned to a B-17 Flying Fortress replacement crew sent to the Eighth Air Force in March 1944.

=== Bomber co-pilot ===
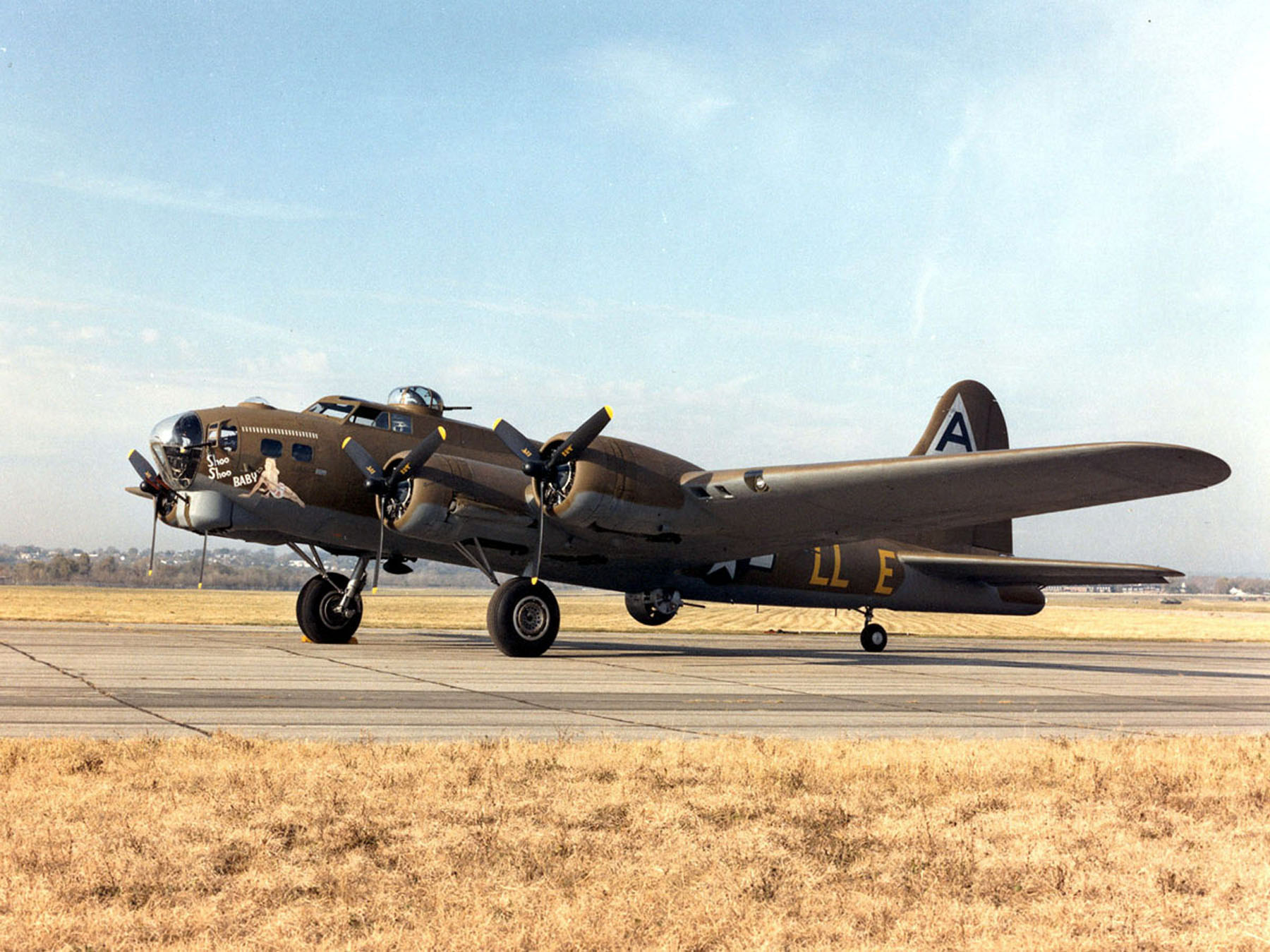
Boeing B-17G "Shoo Shoo Baby" at the National Museum of the United States Air Force.

Assigned to the 401st Bomb Squadron, 91st Bomb Group at Bassingbourn, England, he began flying missions with the crew of 2nd Lt. Sam Newton on April 19, 1944, with their first to Kassel, Germany. Thereafter the crew flew an average of two to three missions per week, usually on consecutive days. This pattern continued through May as the 91st attacked both strategic targets in Germany, V-1 launch sites, and targets in France in preparation for Operation Overlord. Their first mission against Berlin occurred on May 7.

Newton's crew was assigned to and primarily flew a B-17G-50-BO, s/n 42–102504, nicknamed Times A-Wastin'; it carried the fuselage codes LL - D. The crew flew one mission in another noted 91st B-17, Shoo Shoo Shoo Baby, fuselage codes LL-E, on May 25, 1944, to bomb Essey-les-Nancy airfield in France, but turned back to base early because the plane's oxygen system malfunctioned.

Stiles continued to write, both highly personalized pieces for the London Daily Mail, articles for Yank and Air Force Magazine, and the manuscript for a book. He eventually flew twenty missions with Sam Newton's crew, and his manuscript was a journal-style memoir of his experiences with them. In mid-June 1944, he was separated from Newton's crew and out of combat for a month, and when he resumed flying, he completed his 35-mission combat tour for the 91st Bomb Group with a different crew.

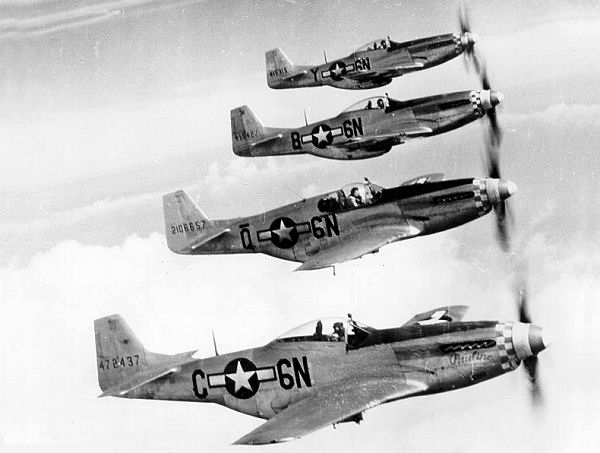
P-51 Mustangs of the 505th Fighter Squadron

=== Fighter pilot ===
Stiles refused an opportunity to return to the United States as a flight instructor and volunteered for a second tour with the Eighth, requesting an assignment to fighters. He completed conversion training and was assigned as a pilot with the 505th Fighter Squadron, 339th Fighter Group, a P-51 Mustang unit stationed at Fowlmere, England, about five miles distant from his previous base at Bassingbourn.

On November 26, 1944, on the 16th mission of his second tour, Stiles' squadron was flying at 26,000 feet altitude south of Hanover, Germany, on a bomber escort mission. Stiles was flying a P-51 nicknamed Tar Heel, normally flown by Captain James R. Starnes of his squadron (P-51D- s/n 44-14113). Encountering 40-60 Luftwaffe Fw 190s, Stiles engaged one in combat and shot it down (Air Force Historical Study No. 85 credits Stiles with the kill), but apparently became disoriented when the dogfight descended to low altitude. His P-51 impacted the ground almost immediately, killing him. Stiles is interred at the Ardennes American Cemetery, Neupré, Liège, Belgium.

=== Remembrance ===
Stiles was one of the veterans profiled in the History Channel's show WWII in HD.

=== Awards and decorations ===
Army Air Forces Pilot Badge

Distinguished Flying Cross
Purple Heart
Air Medal with silver oak leaf cluster
American Campaign Medal
European-African-Middle Eastern Campaign Medal with two bronze campaign stars
World War II Victory Medal

Army Presidential Unit Citation

== Serenade to the Big Bird ==
His mother commemorated his memory by having his book published in 1947 in England (Lindsay Drummond Ltd.), with its first U.S. publication in 1952 (W.W. Norton & Company). Entitled Serenade to the Big Bird, the book achieved cult status among aviation enthusiasts for its honest depictions of bomber combat and also won favorable literary reviews for its spare, Hemingway-style prose and its anti-war sensitivity. It has been re-issued periodically, the most recent in 2001. Another book, titled "Serenade to the Blue Lady, The Story of Bert Stiles", written by Robert Floyd Cooper was published in 1993.
