= 91st Bombardment Group =

WW2 US Army Air Forces unit

91st Bombardment Group (Heavy)
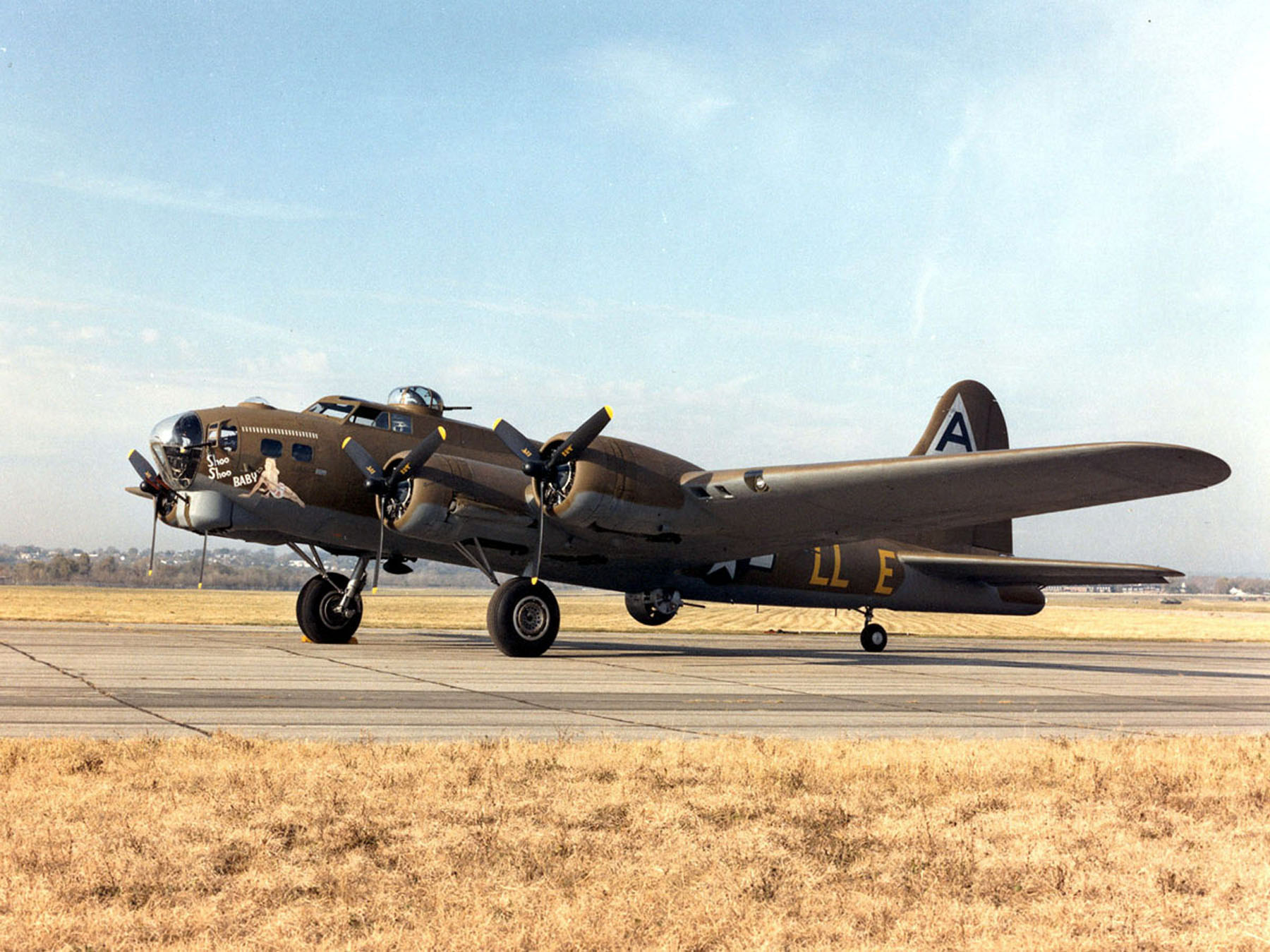
- 91st Bombardment Group B-17 Shoo Shoo Baby
- Active: 14 April 1942
- Country: United States
- Branch: United States Army Air Forces
- Type: Heavy bombardment group
- Role: Strategic bombardment
- Size: 1942: 35 aircraft; 48 crews; 1,800 personnel 1945: 72 aircraft; 96 crews; 2,200 personnel
- Part of: Eighth Air Force
- Garrison/HQ: RAF Bassingbourn, UK
- Engagements: DUC: Hamm, 4 March 1943 Schweinfurt, 17 August 1943 DUC: Oschersleben, 11 January 1944 340 combat missions

Commanders
- Notable commanders: Stanley T. Wray

The 91st Bombardment Group (Heavy) was an air combat unit of the United States Army Air Forces during the Second World War. Classified as a heavy bombardment group, the 91st operated Boeing B-17 Flying Fortress aircraft and was known unofficially as "The Ragged Irregulars" or as "Wray's Ragged Irregulars", after the commander who took the group to England. During its service in World War II the unit consisted of the 322nd, 323rd, 324th, and 401st Bomb Squadrons. The 91st Bombardment Group is most noted as the unit in which the bomber Memphis Belle flew (in the 324th Bomb Squadron), and for having suffered the greatest number of losses of any heavy bombardment group in World War II.

The group conducted 340 bombing missions with the Eighth Air Force over Europe, operating out of RAF Bassingbourn. Inactivated at the end of the war, the group was brought back in 1947 as a reconnaissance group of the United States Air Force, and then had its lineage and honors bestowed on like-numbered wings of the Strategic Air Command (SAC), the Air Force Space Command and the Air Force Global Strike Command.

From 1 July 1947, until its drawdown in February 1952, the 91st Strategic Reconnaissance Group provided worldwide surveillance, flying Boeing RB-29s, North American RB-45s and Boeing RB-47s as a subordinate component of the 91st Strategic Reconnaissance Wing, consisting of the 322nd, 323rd, and 324th Strategic Recon Squadrons, and the 91st Air Refueling Squadron (Medium). The group was inactivated on 28 May 1952, as part of an SAC-wide termination of groups as an organizational echelon, while the wing and all subordinate units remained active until 8 November 1957.

The group was activated in 1991 as the 91st Operations Group. Between 1991 and 1994, and since 1996, the 91st Operations Group, initially as part of the 91st Space Wing, and since renamed the 91st Missile Wing, maintains the alert force of Minuteman III intercontinental ballistic missiles maintained at Minot Air Force Base, North Dakota. Its three missile squadrons, however, have no traditional link to the 91st Bombardment Group and were previously part of the 455th Strategic Missile Wing and 455th Bombardment Group.

== Organization of the 91st Bomb Group (H) ==
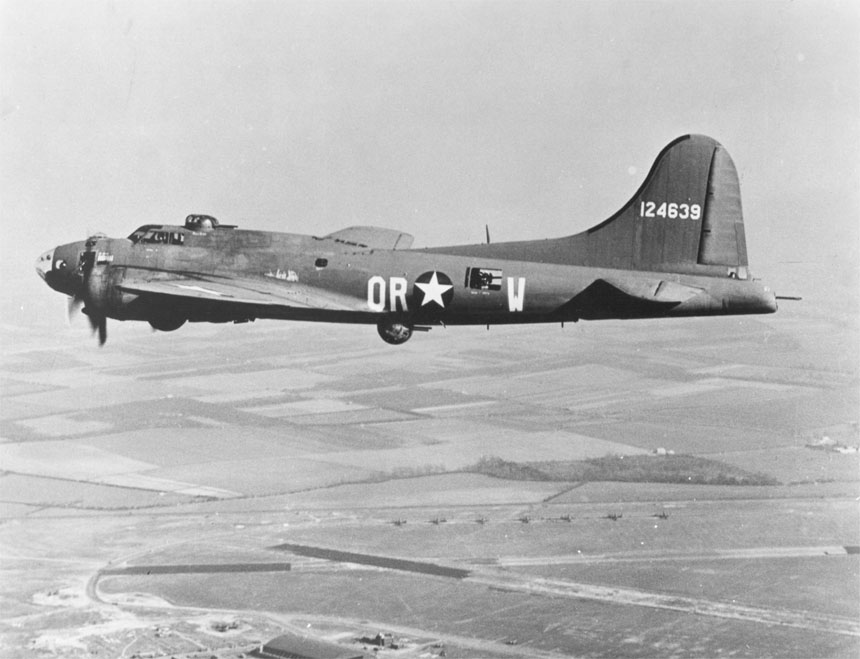
B-17F The Careful Virgin, 323rd Bomb Squadron, completed 80 missions and transferred to Operation Aphrodite

The 91st Bombardment Group (Heavy) was activated on 14 April 1942, by General Order 31 of the Third Air Force.

=== Wartime command staff ===
Group Commanders	Dates of command	Notes
1st Lt. Edward R. Akert	15 April 1942 – 15 May 1942	
Col. Stanley T. Wray	15 May 1942 – 22 May 1943	
Lt. Col. William M. Reid	22 May 1943 – 25 June 1943	
Lt. Col. Clemens L. Wurzbach	25 June 1943 – 12 December 1943	
Col. Claude E. Putnam	12 December 1943 – 16 May 1944	
Col. Henry W. Terry¹	17 May 1944 – 30 May 1945	
Col. Donald E. Sheeler	30 May 1945 – 23 June 1945	
Deputy Group Commanders	Dates of service	Notes
Lt. Col. Baskin R. Lawrence, Jr.	16 May 1942 – 1 May 1943	
Lt. Col. William M. Reid	1 May 1943 – 22 May 1943	
unknown	23 May 1943 – 13 September 1943	
Lt. Col. Theodore R. Milton	13 September 1943 – 23 October 1944	
Lt. Col.Donald E. Sheeler	23 October 1944 – 30 May 1945	
Lt. Col. Immanuel J. Klette	30 May 1945—July 1945	
Operations officers (S-3's)	Dates of service	Notes
Major Edward P. Myers	15 October 1942 – 30 December 1942	Killed in action
Lt. Col. Baskin R. Lawrence	January 1943 – 1 May 1943	
Lt. Col. David G. Alford	23 May 1943 – 4 February 1944	Prisoner of war
Major Charles D. Lee, Jr.	5 February 1944 – 22 April 1944	Prisoner of war
Lt. Col. Donald E. Sheeler (Note: Lt. Col. Sheeler, while Operations Officer, was also acting group commander from 15 November 1944, to 30 December 1944, in the absence of Col. Terry.)	26 April 1944 – 1 December 1944	
Lt. Col. Marvin D. Lord	1 December 1944 – 3 February 1945	Killed in action
Major Karl W. Thompson	4 February 1945—June 1945	

=== Squadron commanders ===
Four heavy bomb squadrons were constituted 16 May 1942, and assigned to the group.

322d Bombardment Squadron (Heavy)	Dates of command	Notes
Major Victor Zienowicz	16 May 1942 – 23 November 1942	Killed in action
Major Paul Fishburne	24 November 1942 – 19 May 1943	
Major Robert B. Campbell	20 May 1943 – 16 July 1943	
Lt. Col. Donald E. Sheeler	16 July 1943 – 25 April 1944	
Major Leroy B. Everett	25 April 1944 – 26 August 1944	
Major Karl W. Thompson	26 August 1944 – 5 February 1945	
Major Edwin F. Close	5 February 1945—June 1945	
323d Bombardment Squadron (Heavy)	Dates of command	Notes
Major Paul Brown	16 May 1942 – 22 April 1943	
Major John C. Bishop	25 May 1943 – 22 January 1944	
Lt. Col. James F. Berry	22 January 1944 – 3 October 1944	
Major Willis J. Taylor	3 October 1944—June 1945	
324th Bombardment Squadron (Heavy)	Dates of command	Casualty Status
Major Harold Smelser	16 May 1942 – 23 November 1942	Killed in action
Major Claude E. Putnam	29 November 1942 – 17 February 1943	
Major Haley Aycock	17 February 1943—unknown 1943	
Major Richard W. Wietzenfeld	unknown 1943 – 30 July 1944	
Major Immanuel J. Klette	30 July 1944 – 30 May 1945	
401st Bombardment Squadron (Heavy)	Dates of command	Casualty Status
Major Edward P. Myers	16 May 1942 – 15 October 1942	
Captain Haley W. Aycock	15 October 1942 – 8 November 1942	Wounded in action
Major Edward P. Myers (Note: Major Myers, the Group's S-3, was also acting 401st BS commander because of casualties.)	9 November 1942 – 30 December 1942	Killed in action
Lt. Col. Clyde G. Gillespie	31 December 1942 – 25 April 1944	
Major James H. McPartlin	25 April 1944 – 1 July 1944	
LtCol. Marvin D. Lord	1 July 1944 – 1 December 1944	
Major John D. Davis	1 December 1944—June 1945	

== History ==
=== Establishment ===
Established 28 January 1942, and activated on 14 April 1942 at Harding Field, Louisiana, the 91st Bombardment Group consisted of a small administrative cadre without subordinate units until 13 May 1942, when it was moved to MacDill Field, Florida. There Lt. Col. Stanley T. Wray took command of the group, and the four flying squadrons assigned to the group were activated. The 91st received air crews and began phase one training with just three B-17's available. On 26 June 1942, the group (now consisting of 83 officers and 78 enlisted men) was transferred to the Second Air Force and moved to Walla Walla Army Air Base, Washington to complete phase two training, with two squadrons operating from satellite fields at Pendleton Field and Redmond Army Air Base, Oregon.

The 91st received orders to deploy overseas and on 24 August 1942, the ground echelon entrained for Fort Dix, New Jersey, where it remained until 5 September, embarking on the RMS Queen Mary. Arriving at Greenock, Scotland, on 11 September, the ground echelon moved by train to RAF Kimbolton, a war expansion airfield in the English Midlands.

Part of the air echelon moved on 24 August 1942, to Gowen Field, Idaho, where it received six new B-17F aircraft. From there it flew by pairs, making frequent stops, to Dow Field, Maine. The remainder of the air crews relocated to Dow by train, arriving 1 September. Between 4 and 24 September the group flew training missions while it received 29 additional B-17's from air depots in Middletown, Pennsylvania; Cheyenne, Wyoming; Tulsa, Oklahoma; and Denver, Colorado, and conducted phase three training.

The group moved by squadrons to the United Kingdom, beginning with the 324th Bombardment Squadron on 25 September, flying to Gander, Newfoundland. The 324th made a non-stop flight along the North Ferry Route on 30 September, landing at Prestwick Airport, Scotland. The 322d Bombardment Squadron moved to Gander on 30 September, and Prestwick on 1 October, followed by one day by the 401st Bombardment Squadron. The group lost one of its 35 bombers during transit when a 401st B-17 crashed in fog into a hillside near Cushendall, Northern Ireland, killing 8 of the crew and a flight surgeon.

The 324th Squadron flew as a unit from Prestwick to Kimbolton on 1 October, followed by the 322nd on 2 October and the 401st on 6 October. On 10 October, the remaining squadron, the 323rd, flew to Gander from Dow. It did not reach Prestwick until 14 October, by which time the 91st had changed bases.

VIII Bomber Command had assigned the 91st to Kimbolton intending it to be its operational base. The installation was of war-time construction and had not yet been reconstructed to Class A airfield specifications. Intended as a light or medium bomber field, its runways were not suitable for the combat weights of B-17s fully loaded with bombs and fuel. Three practice missions in as many days indicated to the staff of the 91st that the runway would quickly deteriorate and Colonel Wray immediately consulted Col. Newton Longfellow, VIII BC commander, who suggested Wray inspect the RAF Bomber Command OTU base at RAF Bassingbourn, Cambridgeshire (52°06′N 00°03′W), to see if it might be suitable.

Wray traveled to RAF Bassingbourn, located four miles (6 km) north of Royston. Not only was the base more appealing from its closer proximity to London, but it had been constructed in 1938 and was considerably more comfortable, with permanent brick buildings, including barracks for enlisted personnel (in contrast to the Nissen huts at Kimbolton), landscaped grounds with curbed roadways (Kimbolton, like many war-time fields, was noted for muddy conditions); and had already been re-constructed to a Class A airfield.

Wray contacted his staff and ordered them to prepare for immediate relocation. On 14 October, without prior approval, the 91st moved itself and all of its equipment to Bassingbourn in one day and took possession of the station.

=== Start of combat operations ===
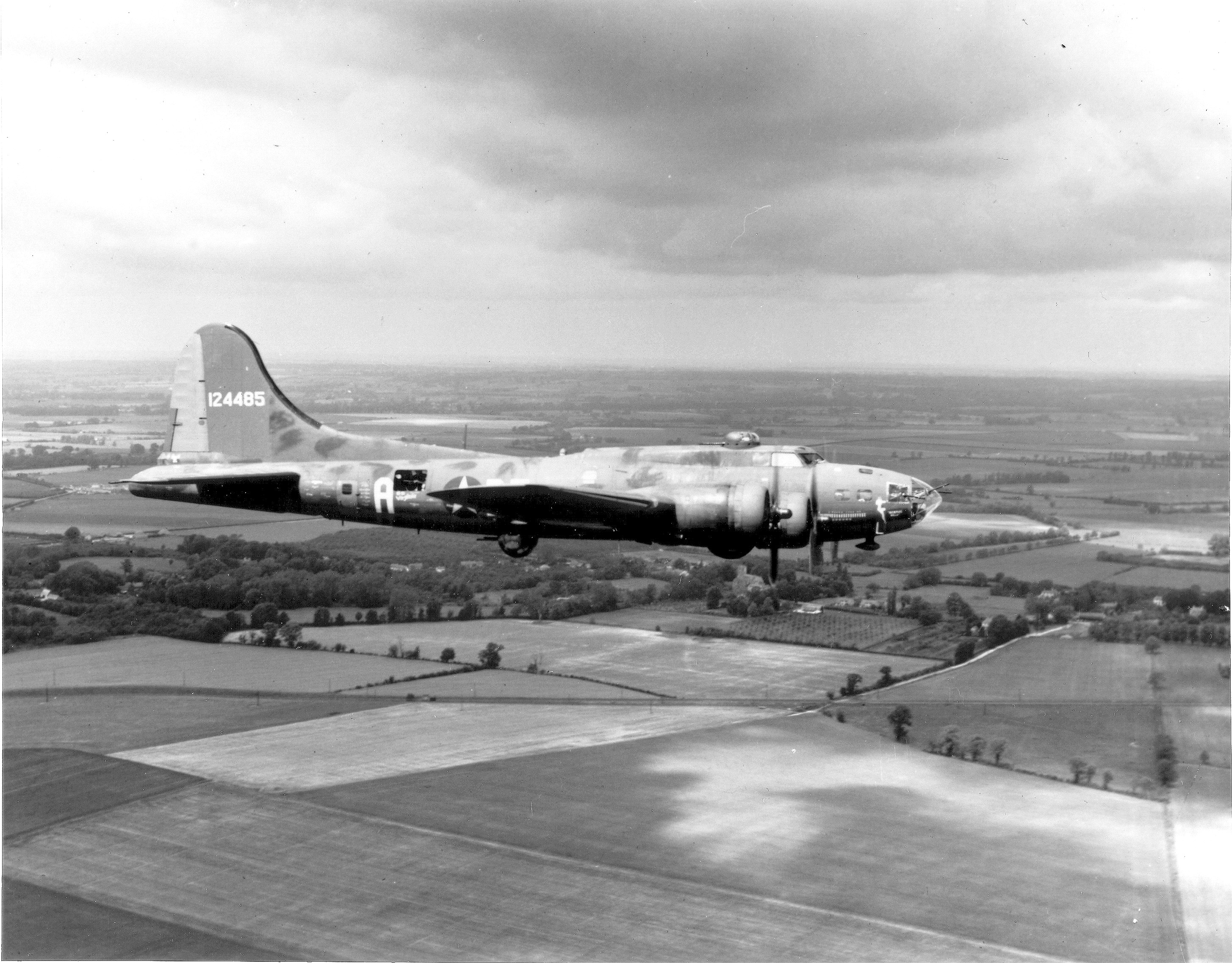
The Memphis Belle, 324th Bomb Squadron

The 91st began combat operations on 4 November 1942, when it received a field order for a mission to bomb the submarine pens at Brest, France, later changed to an attack on the Luftwaffe airfield at Abbeville. Thirty minutes before takeoff the mission was cancelled ("scrubbed" in the parlance of that time) because of poor weather. These circumstances were typical of those encountered daily by all the heavy bomber groups in the autumn of 1942 as they pioneered the concept of strategic bombing by daylight.

On 4 November the Eighth Air Force consisted of just nine groups. Four (91st, 97th, 301st and 303d) had been earmarked for the Twelfth Air Force in support of Operation Torch and were in England to acquire combat experience and stage for forward movement to North Africa. Two (97th and 301st) had already been withdrawn from operations to prepare for imminent transfer to Algeria and another (92nd) to act as an operational training unit (OTU) for replacement combat crews. Of the six remaining units only the 93rd Bombardment Group (a Consolidated B-24 Liberator unit) and the 306th Bombardment Group were operational, and the 306th had flown only two missions. As late as 15 December the impending transfer of the 91st BG to Algeria was postponed because of logistics difficulties and a shortage of airdromes in North Africa.

The group's first mission was to Brest, France, on 7 November. The target was the Kriegsmarine submarine base, and was the first of 28 missions against the U-boat force in the following eight months. In all, eight missions were flown in November 1942, seven of them against the sub pens. The last of these, on 23 November, resulted in the disastrous loss of two squadron commanders, the group navigator, the group bombardier, and three of the five airplanes attacking.

In December 1942 VIII Bomber Command issued two-letter squadron identification codes to be painted on the fuselages of the bombers:

- 322nd BS – LG
- 323rd BS – OR
- 324th BS – DF
- 401st BS – LL

The 91st was made a part of the 101st Provisional Bomb Wing on 3 January 1943. Its first mission to a target in Germany occurred 27 January, and it earned the first of two Distinguished Unit Citations on 4 March when it continued an attack against the marshalling yards at Hamm, Germany, after all the other groups had turned back because of poor weather conditions. On 17 April the group led the Eighth Air Force on its first mission against the German aircraft industry, attacking Bremen. German fighter reaction was intense and sustained, and the Eighth lost twice as many bombers as on any previous mission. The 91st had six B-17s shot down, all from the 401st Bomb Squadron.

During this phase the group received a substantial number of aircraft to replace those lost or written off. However replacements for lost crewmen were few and made by transfer of individuals. The influx of replacement crews from the Combat Crew Replacement Center at Bovingdon did not begin until March 1943 when the personnel requirements of Operation Torch were largely fulfilled. As the 91st developed combat experience, it experienced a decrease in aircraft commanders, apart from missing aircraft and wounds, from moving pilots into command and staff positions. Without an adequate pool of replacements, many co-pilots were upgraded to aircraft commanders.

=== Pointblank ===
The second phase of combat operations, coinciding with the implementation of the Pointblank Directive to target German airpower, began in May 1943. The Eighth developed in the next three months into a force of sixteen B-17 groups and began attacking industrial targets deep inside Germany beginning at the end of July. Col. Wray left the 91st on 22 May to become commander of a new wing, the 103rd Provisional Combat Bomb Wing. He was replaced by the group deputy commander, Lt. Col. William Reid, formerly of the 92nd Bombardment Group. Lt. Col. Baskin Lawrence, who had been the deputy commander of the 91st from its date of activation, had left the group 1 May to command the 92nd.

On 25 June 1943, a wholesale shifting of command officers between the two groups occurred. Col. Lawrence departed the 92nd to become commander of a new "Pathfinder" group drawn from a squadron of the 92nd, and was replaced by Col. Reid, who left the 91st to command his old group. The 91st received its third commander, Lt. Col. Clemens Wurzbach, who had been Lawrence's deputy commander.

During this transition period the 91st also had its first crews finish their required combat tours and return to the United States, including the crew of the Memphis Belle. Of the original roster of combat crews, 32% completed their tours, 15% were reassigned to other commands, and the rest became casualties. At the end of June it also acquired its most recognizable symbol, the "Triangle A" group tail marking often used in films about B-17s.

On 17 August 1943, the 91st Group led a mission to bomb the ball-bearing factories at Schweinfurt, Germany, losing 10 aircraft. This was the first of several missions between then and 14 October 1943, in which the Eighth Air Force, flying beyond the range of its fighter escorts, suffered severe losses of aircraft and crews. The 91st had 28 aircraft shot down during this period, the most of any group in the Eighth. The remainder of the second phase of operations saw a suspension of deep penetration missions until long-range escort fighters became available.

Until 22 September 1943, the 91st BG had been equipped entirely with B-17F aircraft that had not been modified for longer-range Tokyo tanks. On that date it received is first B-17G, which would become the standard bomber of the Eighth Air Force in 1944–1945. It continued to receive B-17F replacement aircraft, along with the B-17G's, until 24 December 1943.

Col. Wurzbach completed his tour of duty on 12 December 1943, and was replaced by Col. Claude E. Putnam, a former commander of the 324th Bomb Squadron, who returned to his old group from duty as the commander of the 306th Bombardment Group, where he had been pilot of the lead aircraft on the first mission to Germany nearly a year before. Wurzbach had commanded the group for 44 missions; Putnam would command it for 63.

=== 1944-1945 ===
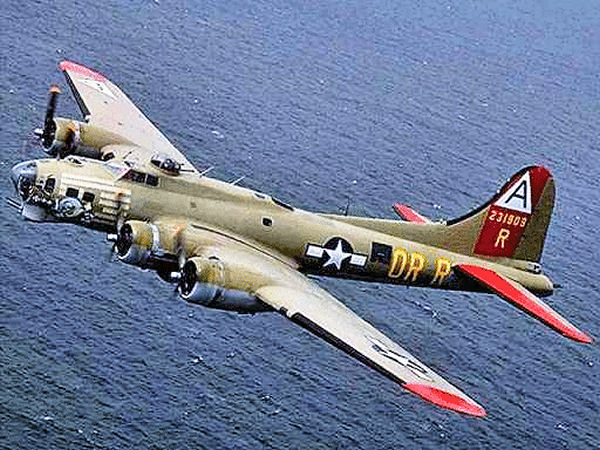
Nine-O-Nine, 323rd BS B-17G, displaying 1st Combat Bomb Wing tail markings

The 91st won its second DUC as part of the six-group task force attacking the AGO Flugzeugwerke assembly factory (license-building the Focke-Wulf Fw 190A) at Oschersleben, Germany, on 11 January 1944. This attack marked the renewal of the heavy bomber offensive against targets in all areas of the German Reich. Although losses were heavy (34 from the Oschersleben task force and 60 overall), three targets were struck by over 600 bombers and a group of P-51 Mustangs was part of the escort force.

From 20 to 25 February 1944, known as "Big Week", the United States Strategic Air Forces conducted Operation Argument, a campaign against the German aircraft industry with the goal of achieving air superiority over Europe by drawing the German fighter force into combat. 800 to 1000 bombers, escorted by 700 to 900 fighters, struck multiple targets daily from both England and Italy. The 91st flew all five days, losing ten aircraft, and on 24 February attacked Schweinfurt for the third time.

The first attack by the 91st on Berlin came on 6 March, when it led the entire Eighth Air Force at a loss of 69 bombers (6 of them from the 91st), followed by half a dozen more to the German capital in the next two months. On 12 May the Eighth Air Force began a costly campaign against oil and synthetic oil production facilities that continued to the end of the war. On 17 May, Col. Putnam completed his tour as commanding officer of the 91st Group and Col. Henry W. Terry took command, which he would retain for 185 missions to the end of hostilities in Europe. Aided by the use of radar-equipped Pathfinder force bombers, the 91st BG averaged a mission every other day for the remainder of the war.

In addition to bombing strategic targets, often at great loss in aircraft and crews, the 91st also made tactical strikes in support of the Allied landings in France, in the battles for Caen and Saint-Lô, during the German winter counteroffensive, and during the Allied offensive across the Rhine River.

Beginning 16 March 1944, the 91st began receiving replacement B-17's that were by a change in USAAF policy no longer painted olive drab, and the bomber force became almost completely "natural metal finish" by July 1944. The 1st Combat Bomb Wing, of which the 91st was a part, adopted the use of a red empennage and wingtips in June 1944 to more easily identify its groups during assembly for missions. The 91st retained its "Triangle A" tail marking as well.

The intensity of operations during this phase is reflected by the 100 B-17's lost by the 91st Group during 1944, compared to 84 in 1943, despite the diminution of the Luftwaffe during the spring and summer. Radar-directed flak became very proficient in defending critical targets and the fighter force hoarded its pilots and fuel for occasional mass interceptions of the bombers.

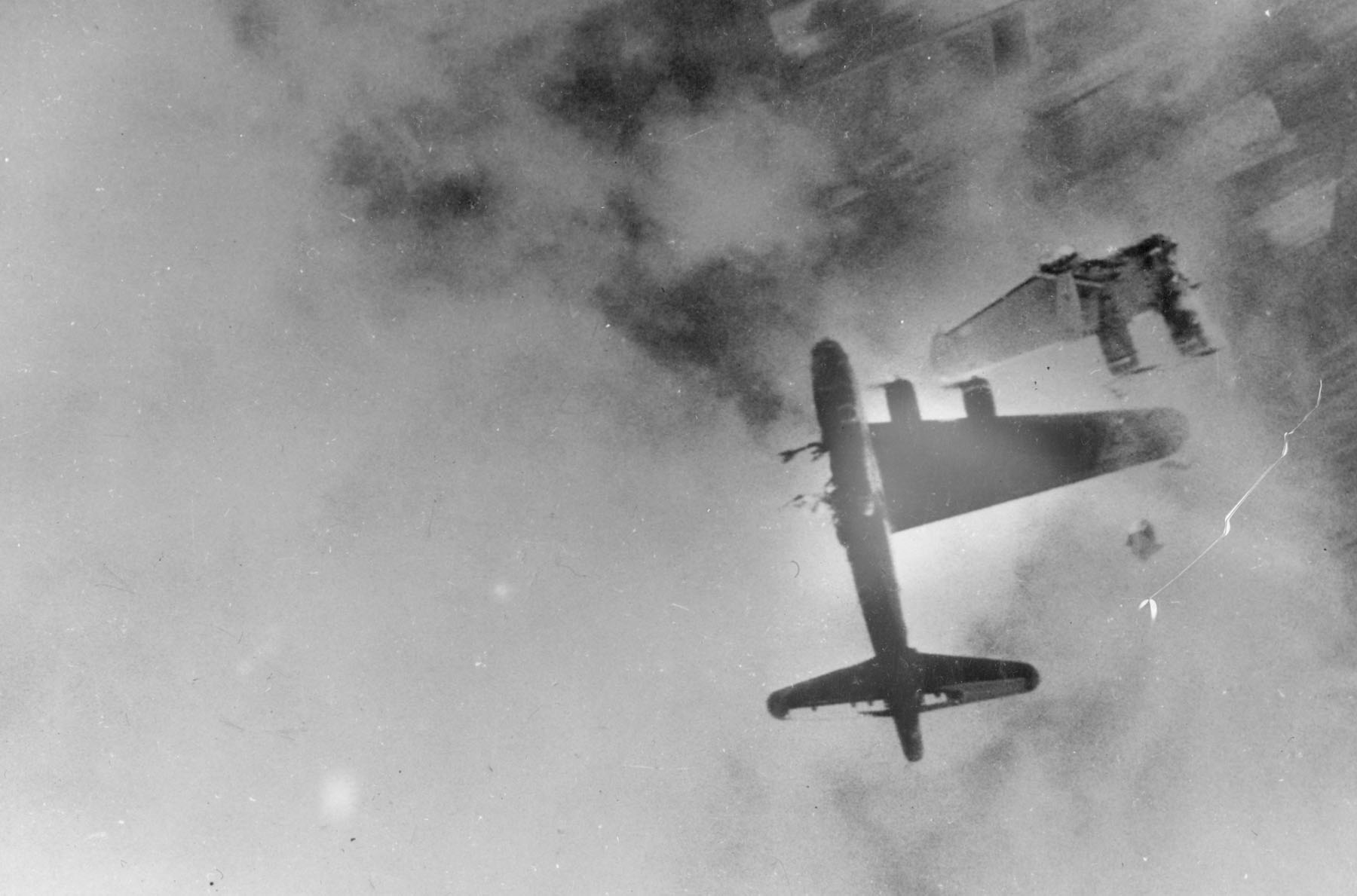
Wee Willie, a B-17G of 322d Squadron, after flak hit over Stendal, 8 April 1945

The 91st BG experienced its worst loss of the war during this period on 2 November 1944, when it attacked the I.G. Farbenindustrie A.G. synthetic oil plant at Leuna, southeast of Merseburg, Germany. Suffering several losses to intense flak, for which this target was notorious, the 91st found itself isolated from the bomber stream at the division rally point, where it was attacked by large numbers of Fw 190A-R8 sturm fighters of IV./JG 3. In all, thirteen B-17s of the 91st were shot down out of 37 dispatched and half of the remainder suffered major battle damage. 49 of the 117 crewmen aboard the Fortresses were killed and the remainder captured.

On 23 November 1944 a B-17 from the group which had been abandoned by its crew after reporting damage mysteriously landed itself at an RAF airfield in Belgium.

The group lost its final aircraft on 17 April 1945, and flew its last mission, to Pilsen, Czechoslovakia, on 25 April. It had been alerted for 500 combat missions, of which 160 were scrubbed or recalled and 340 completed. Immediately after VE Day, it flew three days of operations to rescue Allied POWs incarcerated at Stalag Luft I in Barth, Germany, as part of Operation Revival, bringing out 2,032 prisoners.

=== Casualties ===
91st BG losses (Note: Aircraft losses from Havelaar, total from USAAF via Freeman. Personnel losses from both. Crew losses from 91st BG daily logs.)
197	B-17s lost in combat
10	B-17s lost in accidents
887	Air crew killed in action
33	Air crew killed in accidents
123	Air crew missing in action
959	Air crew captured

The 91st Group had at least 392 B-17s assigned to it at some point of the war. Of these, 40 were transferred to other commands, 37 were retired as unsuitable for further operations, and 71 were on hand at the end of hostilities. The rest were lost: 197 in combat, 37 written off, and 10 in training crashes. Of the combat losses, the 401st and 323rd Squadrons each lost 55, the 322nd Squadron lost 49, and the 324th Squadron 38.

Approximately 5,200 crewmen flew combat missions for the 91st from 1942 to 1945. 19% were killed or missing (887 Killed in actio and 123 Missing in action (MIA) and 18% (959) became prisoners of war. 33 others were killed in flying accidents. Of the 35 original crews to arrive at Bassingbourn, 17 were lost in combat (47%). Daily records indicate that for the first six months of operations, 22 of 46 listed crews were lost (48%).

The fatalities in the 91st Group, equivalent to an infantry regiment in numbers of combat personnel, exceeded the killed-in-action of more than half (47) of the Army's ground force divisions, and equaled or exceeded the rate of killed-in-action in the infantry regiments of 35 others. Only seven divisions (all infantry) had killed-in-action rates higher than the 91st BG.

== Honors and campaigns ==
Distinguished Unit Citation

- Hamm, 4 March 1943
- Oschersleben, 11 January 1944

World War II:

- Air Offensive, Europe
- Normandy
- Northern France
- Rhineland
- Ardennes-Alsace
- Central Europe

=== Post-war and USAF history ===
91st Operations Group
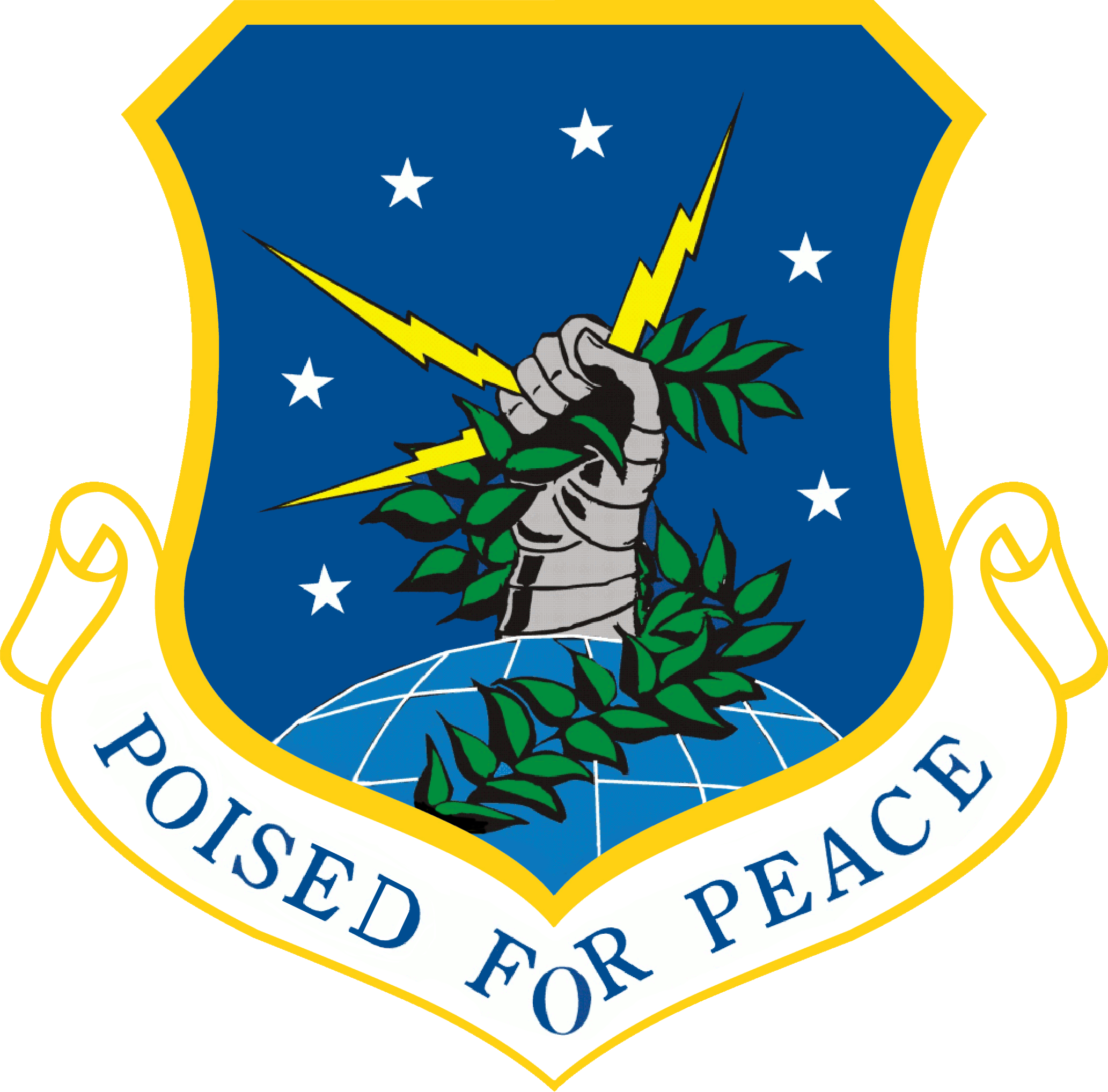
- Active: 1 September 1991
- Country: United States
- Branch: United States Air Force
- Type: Missile operations
- Role: Strategic deterrence
- Size: 150 Minuteman III
- Part of: 91st Space Wing
- Garrison/HQ: Minot AFB, North Dakota

The air echelon left Bassingbourn on 27 May 1945, and moved to Drew AAB, Tampa, Florida. The ground echelon sailed on the RMS Queen Elizabeth to New York on 24 June. The group reunited on 2 July, to prepare for transfer to the Pacific Theater, but many members had been transferred to other units and no further training was conducted before the war ended. The group was inactivated on 7 November 1945.

Following the war the group was redesignated the 91st Reconnaissance Group, assigned to the Strategic Air Command, and activated on 1 July 1947 at Barksdale Air Force Base, Louisiana. After the United States Air Force became a separate service, the 91st was redesignated the 91st Strategic Reconnaissance Group on 10 November 1948, and made a part of the 91st Strategic Reconnaissance Wing. It operated a variety of aircraft, including B-17's, RB-17's, B-29's and RB-29's, and B-50's. On 6 July 1950, it was redesignated the 91st Strategic Reconnaissance Group (Medium) and equipped with the jet RB-45C. The group was removed from operations on 10 February 1952, when its squadrons were assigned directly to the wing, and inactivated on 28 May 1952.

The organization was redesignated as the 91st Operations Group on 29 August 1991, and activated at Minot Air Force Base, North Dakota. on 1 September 1991. Inactivated on 1 July 1994, it was again activated on 1 February 1996. The 91st OG is responsible for the operations of three missile squadrons maintaining a nuclear alert force of 150 LGM-30G Minuteman III ICBMs and 15 alert facilities spread across 8,500 square miles (22,000 km^{2}) of territory. The squadrons of the 91st OG are:

- 740th Missile Squadron – "Vulgar Vultures"
- 741st Missile Squadron – "Gravelhaulers"
- 742d Missile Squadron – "Wolf Pack"
- 91st Operations Support Squadron – "Pathfinders"
- 54th Helicopter Squadron

USAF group commanders
Date of command	Name
1948	Col. Frank L. Dunn
10 November 1948	Lt. Col. Robert S. Kittel
24 June 1949	Col. Charles R. Greening
23 August 1949	Major James I. Cox
1 October 1949	Col. Jean R. Byerly
25 November 1950	Col. Lewis E. Lyle
August 1951	Col. Joseph A. Preston
1 September 1991	Col. Kenneth R. Beeck
20 February 1992	Col. Wayne E. DeReu
15 June 1993 – 1 July 1994	Lt. Col. Jeffrey A. Kwallek
1 February 1996	Col. Michael M. Evans
28 June 1996	Col. Roosevelt Mercer, Jr.
20 January 1998	Col. Stephen G. Cullen
7 May 1999	Col. Evan J. Hoapili

== Notable members of the 91st Bombardment Group ==
- 1st Lt (later Maj Gen USAF) William J. Crumm, 324th Bomb Squadron. An original member of the group and flew eleven of its first seventeen missions. He and his crew were the first to return from combat, assigned on 14 February 1942, to return to the United States to prepare a training manual for bomber crews. Promoted to lieutenant colonel, Crumm later commanded the 61st Bombardment Squadron, 39th Bombardment Group of the Twentieth Air Force, operating B-29s against Japan. He went on to become a major general in the United States Air Force and died in the mid-air collision of two Boeing B-52 Stratofortress bombers on 6 July 1967, returning from a mission to South Vietnam.
- MSgt Rollin L. Davis, 323rd Bomb Squadron. A maintenance line chief in charge of B-17 42-31909, nicknamed Nine-O-Nine (pictured above), which completed 140 missions between 25 February 1944 and the end of the war, at least 126 in a row without turning back because of mechanical failure, for which MSgt Davis received the Bronze Star.
- Lt Col (later Col USAF) Immanuel J. Klette, 324th Bomb Squadron. Flew 91 bomber missions as a co-pilot and pilot with the 306th Bombardment Group, and as a command pilot with the 91st. Over 30 of his missions were as group, wing, division, or air force mission commander while serving with the 91st BG. His 91 sorties are the most by any Eighth Air Force pilot in World War II.
- Capt (later Col USAF) Robert K. Morgan, 324th Bomb Squadron. An original member of the group, piloted the Memphis Belle in combat and returned it to the United States.
- Bert Stiles, an author who joined 401st Bomb Squadron in 1944 and completed tour. Converted to fighters and killed in action November 26, 1944.

== 91st Bombardment Group in film and literature ==
- Memphis Belle: A Story of a Flying Fortress, a 1944 documentary film
- Memphis Belle, a 1990 film
- Bert Stiles, Serenade to the Big Bird, a 1944 memoir
- John Hersey, The War Lover, a 1959 novel and film (the novel uses the fictional base "Pike Rilling" as its locale and an unnamed group, but all details of the novel are taken directly from 91st BG daily records)
- The tail markings of the 91st were used as those of the fictional 918th Bombardment Group in the film and television series Twelve O'Clock High. At least one incident, a mission to Hamm on 4 March 1943 in which all the other groups except the 91st turned back for bad weather, was also portrayed in the film.
- Sam Halpert, A Real Good War, a semi-autobiographical account of a 35 mission tour with the 91st Bombardment Group.
- Ray Bowden, Plane Names & Fancy Noses – 91st Bomb Group, nose art and named planes of the 91BG with brief histories. See www.usaaf-noseart.co.uk for fuller details.

== 91st Bombardment Group B-17's on exhibit ==
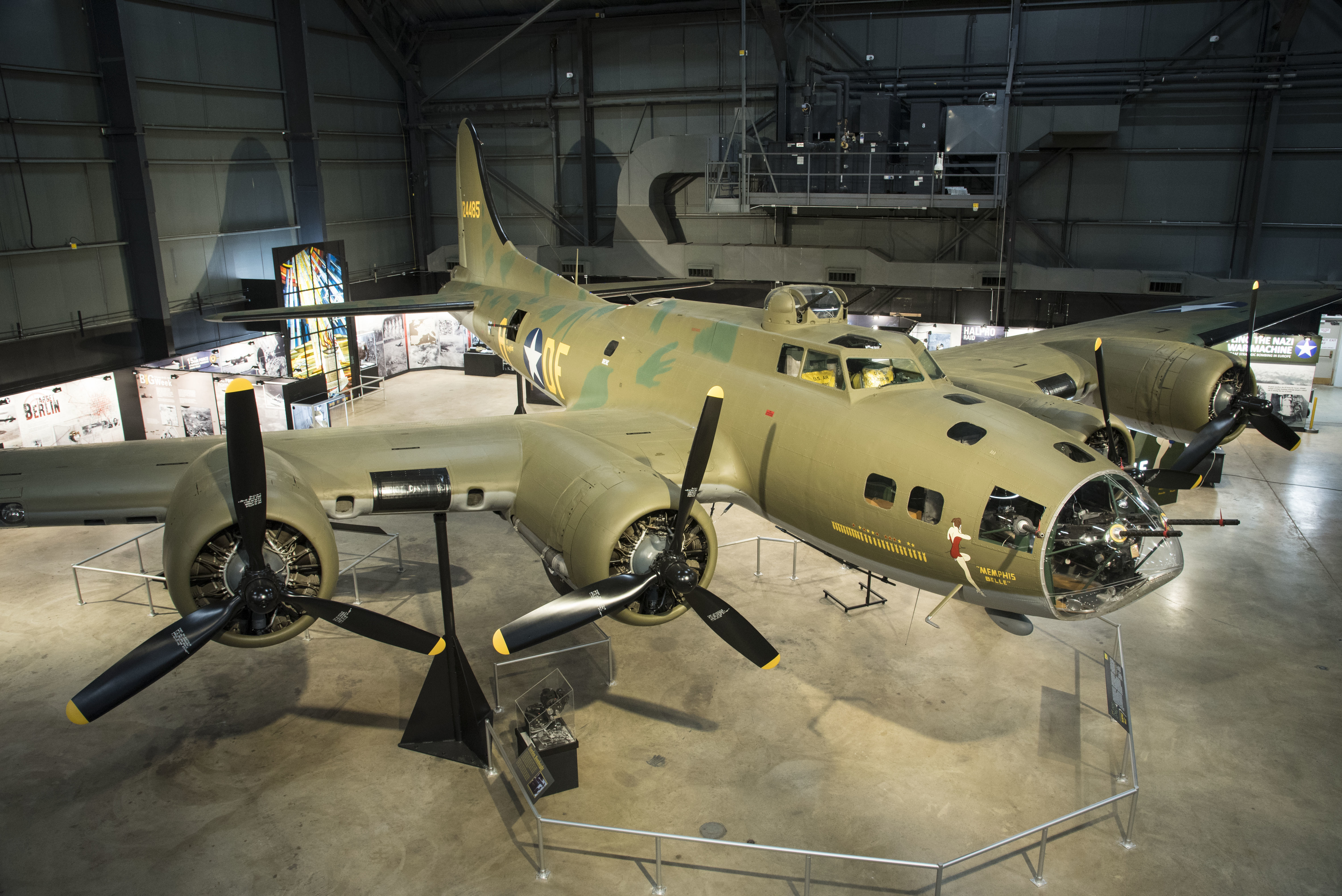
Memphis Belle at the National Museum of the United States Air Force after its restoration was completed

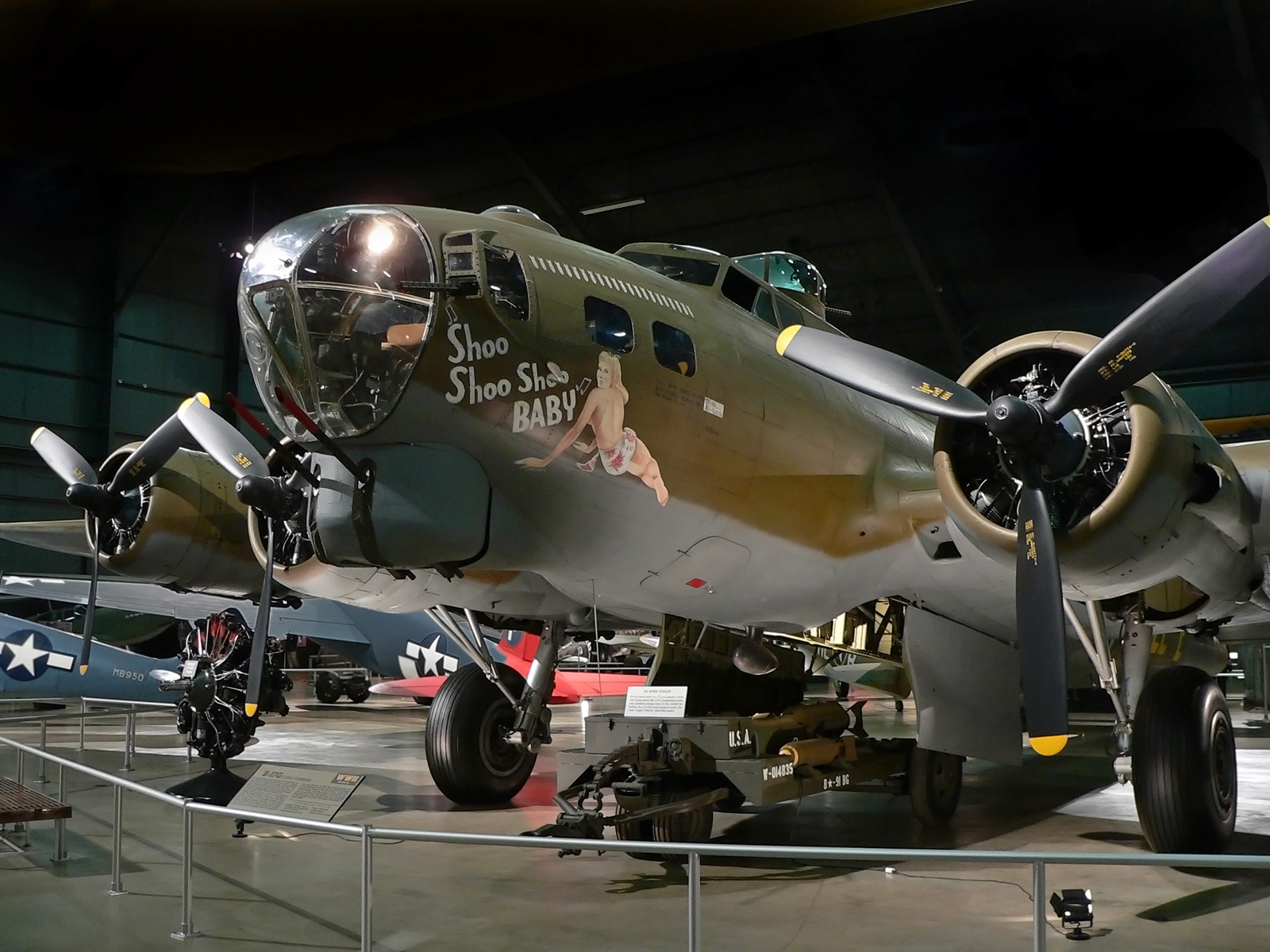
Shoo Shoo Baby at the National Museum of the United States Air Force before reversion to its original nickname

Two 91st B-17's survive, one at the National Museum of the United States Air Force at Dayton, Ohio and the other at the Steven F. Udvar-Hazy Center in Chantilly, Virginia.

- B-17F serial 41-24485-10-BO, 324th BS, marked DF A, Memphis Belle, combat 7 November 1942 to 19 May 1943. Returned to United States to sell war bonds on 8 June 1943. First placed on outdoor display at National Guard in Memphis in 1949, where it slowly deteriorated from weather and vandalism. Moved to Mud Island in 1987, but was still exposed to the elements. Disassembled and taken to Naval Air Station Memphis in 2003 for restoration. Acquired by the National Museum of the United States Air Force in mid-October 2005. There it underwent full restoration and was unveiled at the museum on 17 May 2018. It appears as it did shortly after completing its 25th mission.
- B-17G serial 42-32076-35-BO, 401st BS, marked LL E, Shoo Shoo Baby, in combat 24 March 1944 to 29 May 1944, crash-landed Malmö Airport, Sweden. Repaired in Sweden, it had been used as a civilian transport and recovered in 1972, where it was dismantled, taken to Dover Air Force Base, Delaware, for restoration, and turned over to the museum on 13 October 1988. Due to the amount of skin work required to restore its wartime appearance, it is finished in olive drab and grey, instead of bare-metal as it was during its USAAF service, and has been restored to its original name, Shoo Shoo Baby. It was replaced by Memphis Belle in 2018, and was transferred to the National Air and Space Museum's Steven F. Udvar-Hazy Center in August 2023, where it currently awaits reassembly and a dedicated display.
