= 2019 Boeing B-17 Flying Fortress crash =

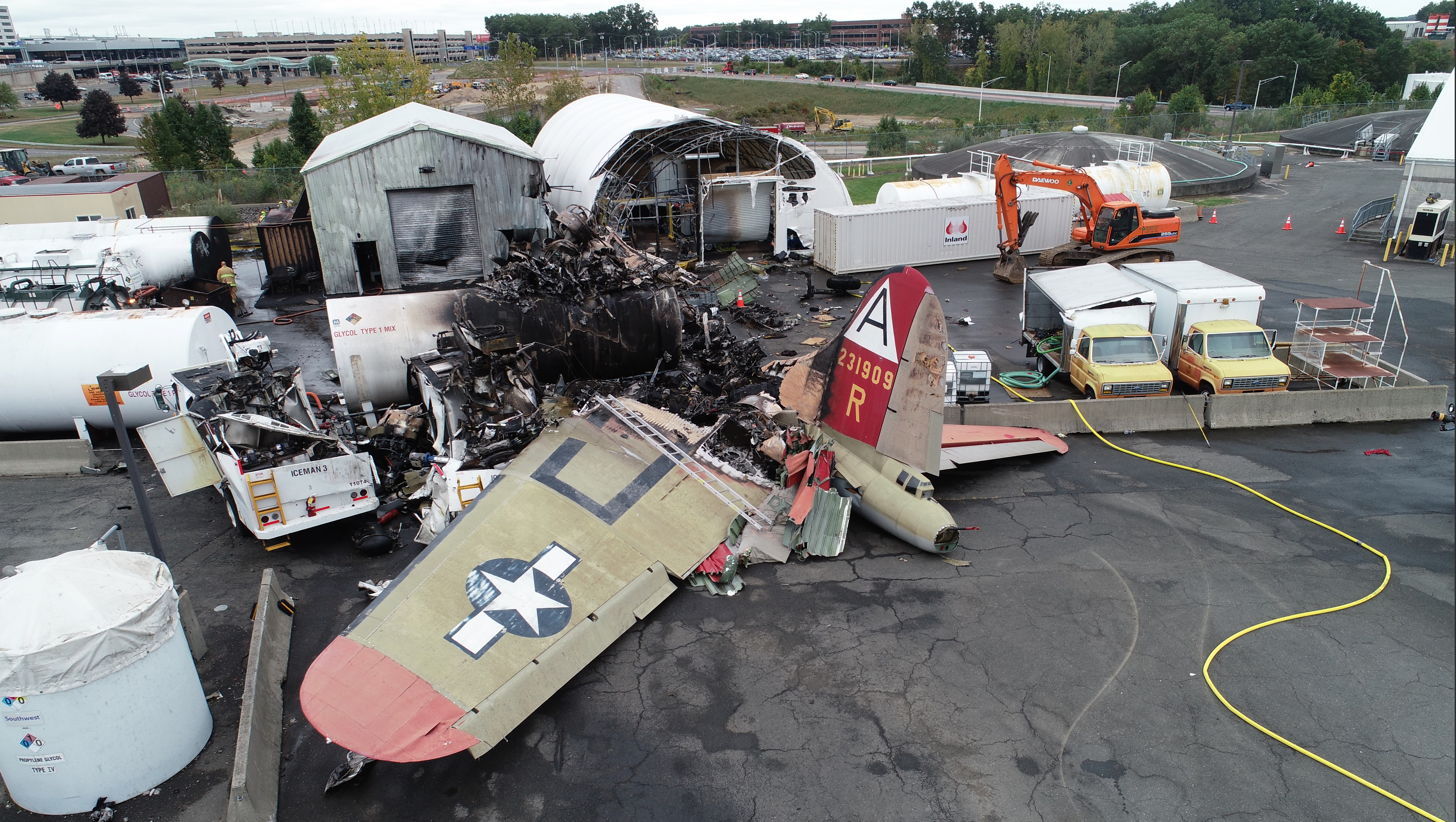
- The burnt-out wreckage of the aircraft

Accident
- Date: October 2, 2019
- Summary: Crashed on final approach due to double engine failure and pilot error
- Site: Bradley International Airport, Windsor Locks, Connecticut, United States; 41°55′54″N 72°41′32″W

Aircraft
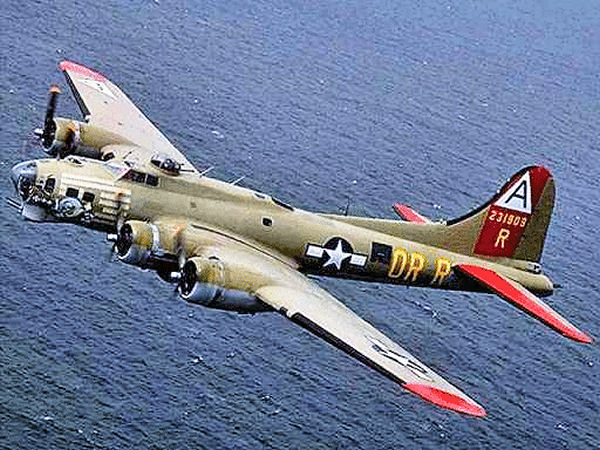
- The aircraft involved, painted as Nine-O-Nine
- Aircraft type: Boeing B-17G-85-DL Flying Fortress
- Aircraft name: Nine-O-Nine (marked as)
- Operator: Collings Foundation
- Registration: N93012; 44-83575 (actual); 42-31909 (marked as)
- Flight origin: Bradley International Airport
- Destination: Bradley International Airport
- Occupants: 13
- Passengers: 10
- Crew: 3
- Fatalities: 7
- Injuries: 6
- Survivors: 6

Ground casualties
- Ground injuries: 1

On October 2, 2019, a Boeing B-17 Flying Fortress privately owned by the Collings Foundation crashed at Bradley International Airport, Windsor Locks, Connecticut, United States. Seven of the thirteen people on board were killed, and the other six, as well as one person on the ground, were injured. The aircraft was destroyed by fire, with only a portion of one wing and the tail remaining.

== Background ==
The Collings Foundation had been operating the aircraft as part of the Living History Flight Experience, a Federal Aviation Administration (FAA) program that allows owners of vintage military aircraft to offer rides in their aircraft for compensation. The foundation's executive director, Rob Collings, had argued that the FAA had been too strict in interpreting the rules of the program, and he had requested changes to allow passengers to manipulate an aircraft's flight controls.

== Aircraft ==
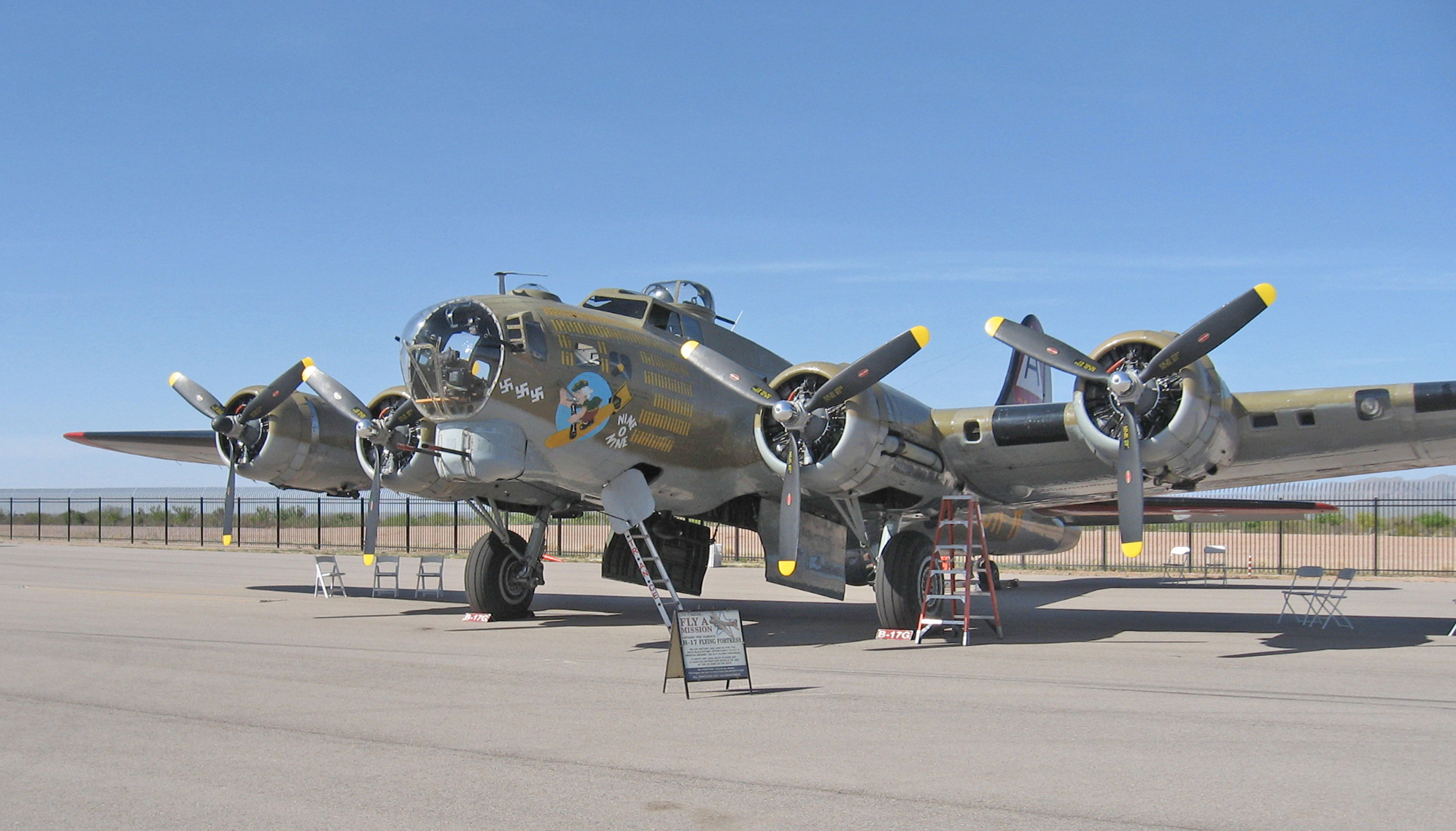
Collings Foundation's Nine-O-Nine, in Marana, Arizona, on April 15, 2011

The aircraft was a 74-year-old Boeing B-17 Flying Fortress, military serial number 44-83575 (variant B-17G-85-DL) with civilian registration N93012. During its military career, the plane operated as an Air-Sea Rescue aircraft until 1952, when it was reassigned to the Air Force Special Weapons Command for use as a specimen in weapons-effects testing. In this role, it was subjected to three nuclear explosions as part of Operation Tumbler–Snapper. The aircraft was purchased as scrap in 1965 for US$269 (equivalent to $2,748 in 2025), restored to airworthiness, and put into operation in 1977 as a water bomber. Following its operator's liquidation in 1985, the aircraft was acquired by the Collings Foundation in January 1986.

By August 1986, N93012 was painted as a different B-17G: Nine-O-Nine, military serial number 42-31909 (variant B-17G-30-BO), which had been scrapped shortly after World War II. While in operation by the foundation, Nine-O-Nine was involved in two accidents: on August 23, 1987, it overran the runway on landing at Beaver County Airport outside Pittsburgh, Pennsylvania; and on July 9, 1995, it was damaged on landing at Karl Stefan Memorial Airport in Norfolk, Nebraska, as the result of an undercarriage (landing gear) malfunction.

== Accident ==
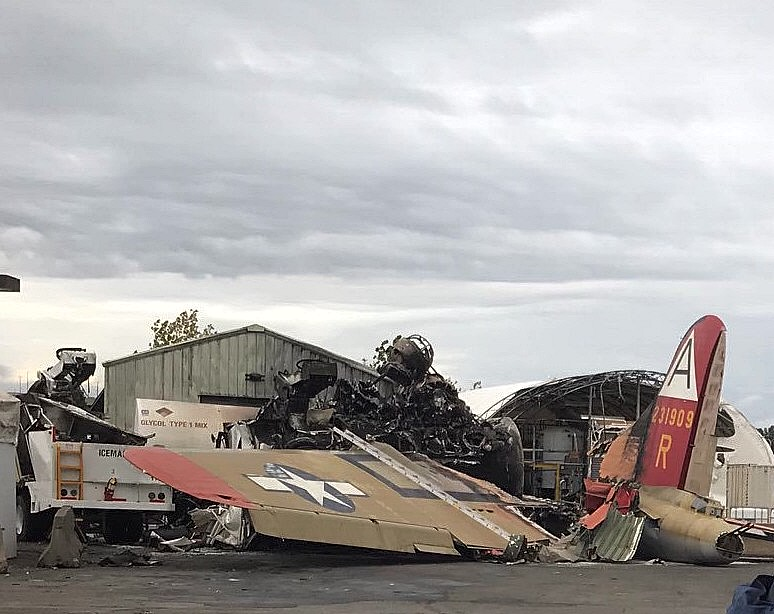
The destroyed B-17 at the crash site

On October 2, 2019, three crew and ten passengers boarded the B-17 for the "living history" flight. Takeoff was delayed by 40 minutes because of difficulty starting one of the engines. The pilot shut down the other engines, used a spray can to "blow out the moisture", and finally got the engine started. The aircraft took off from Bradley International Airport in Windsor Locks, Connecticut, at 09:48 local time (13:48 UTC). A witness reported that an engine was sputtering and smoking. At 09:50, the pilot radioed that there was a problem with the airplane's No. 4 engine, the outer engine on the right wing. The pilot told the crew chief (who was also the loadmaster) to instruct the passengers to return to their seats; after the crew chief did so and returned to the cockpit, the pilot shut down the No. 4 engine. The control tower diverted other traffic and cleared the bomber for an emergency landing on Runway 6. at At 09:54, the aircraft came in low, touched down 1,000 feet (300 m) short of the runway, clipped the Instrument Landing System (ILS) antenna array, veered to the right off the runway across a grassy area and taxiway, and then crashed into a de-icing facility. The aircraft burst into flames.

Seven occupants were killed, including the pilot and co-pilot, aged 75 and 71 respectively. The remaining six were injured severely enough to be taken to the hospital, including one who was airlifted. One of the passengers, a Connecticut Air National Guardsman, managed to open an escape hatch after the crash, despite having a broken arm and collarbone. An airport employee, who had been working in the building into which the plane had crashed, ran to the wreckage to help pull injured passengers from the burning plane. The employee suffered severe burns on his hands and arms and was taken by ambulance to the hospital. One person on the ground was injured.

The airport was closed for three and a half hours following the crash.

The crash and fire destroyed most of the aircraft. Only the left wing and part of the tail remained.

== Investigation ==
The National Transportation Safety Board (NTSB) opened an investigation into the accident. A "go team" was dispatched to Bradley International Airport, headed by Jennifer Homendy.

The FAA also launched an investigation into the crash, and in March 2020, it revoked the exemption that allowed the Collings Foundation to carry paying passengers, citing safety deficiencies found during its investigation. According to the FAA, the foundation had not maintained a "culture of safety", and key personnel overseeing the flight were ignorant of the safety management system (SMS) that the organization had been required to implement to earn the exemption; the FAA found that the B-17 crew chief was completely unaware that the SMS existed.

According to the final report released by the NTSB on May 17, 2021, the probable cause of the crash was:

The pilot's failure to properly manage the airplane's configuration and airspeed after he shut down the No. 4 engine following its partial loss of power during the initial climb. Contributing to the accident was the inadequate maintenance of the airplane while it was on tour, which resulted in the partial loss of power to the Nos. 3 and 4 engines; the ineffective safety management system (SMS) of the Collings Foundation, which failed to identify and mitigate safety risks; and the FAA's inadequate oversight of the Collings Foundation's SMS.

Post-crash teardowns of the No. 4 engine and the No. 3 engine (the inner engine on the right wing) found evidence of poor maintenance of the magnetos and spark plugs, which are critical components of the engines' ignition systems. The spark plugs of the No. 3 engine were worn beyond the manufacturer's specifications although a 25-hour engine inspection was done less than one month before the crash. A 25-hour inspection of the No. 4 engine had been performed only nine days prior, but the left magneto had an intermittent short circuit, and the right magneto was producing a weak spark in 8 of the 9 cylinders due to wear of the compensator cam. The NTSB said the problems with the No. 4 engine magnetos likely caused a loss of engine power that prompted the pilot to shut the engine down, while "The pilot likely did not recognize, or recognized too late, the extent of the loss of engine power on the airplane’s right side."

The NTSB found that the foundation's preflight checklist called for the engine run-up to be performed at lower RPM than specified in the B-17 ground maintenance checklist, and the preflight run-up of the accident flight was in fact performed at a lower RPM setting, which made magneto problems more difficult to detect because the RPM drop caused by a bad magneto would be less pronounced than at higher RPM. The foundation's SMS did not uncover or address this discrepancy in its checklist.

According to the final report, a key factor leading to the crash was the pilot's decision to fly the airfield traffic pattern at an airspeed of about 100 mph (160 km/h) with the landing gear extended. The pilot lowered the gear about 2.7 nmi (5.0 km; 3.1 mi) from the runway threshold, in the downwind leg of the traffic pattern. The NTSB concluded that an airspeed of 120 mph (190 km/h) would have minimized altitude loss, while the lower 100 mph airspeed made the aircraft lose altitude relatively quickly per distance flown, and lowering the gear early increased drag and "exacerbated the situation". The board's airplane performance study found that the B-17 could have reached the runway if the pilot had increased airspeed by lowering the nose and keeping the gear retracted until the final approach.

== Lawsuits ==
Surviving passengers and families of the deceased passengers pressed claims against the Collings Foundation. Two passengers accepted settlements in 2021 and the remaining eight claimants filed lawsuits after the final NTSB report was released. The parties then reached confidential settlements via mediation. The family of the deceased co-pilot also filed a lawsuit against the Collings Foundation.
