= Immanuel J. Klette =

American military officer (1918–1988)

Lieutenant Colonel Immanuel J. Klette (15 February 1918 – 12 February 1988) was a bomber pilot and squadron commander in the U.S. Army Air Forces during World War II.

Klette flew 91 combat missions in all, the most of any bomber pilot in the U.S. Eighth Air Force. His first 21, beginning in March 1943, were as a co-pilot in the 369th Bomb Squadron, 306th Bomb Group, based at RAF Thurleigh. In July 1943 he was upgraded to "first pilot" and assigned a crew, flying 7 additional missions before being seriously injured in a crash landing on September 23.

After a lengthy recuperation and a staff assignment at Headquarters, US Strategic Air Forces (USSTAF), he was selected by a former commander, Henry Terry, now commanding the 91st Bomb Group, to command its 324th Bomb Squadron on July 30, 1944. The 324th BS at that time had assigned to it all the H2X radar "Mickey ships" and often led the group, wing, and division on missions where cloud cover was expected to obstruct the target.

Klette flew missions for the duration of the war in Europe, including the last bomb mission of the Eighth Air Force on April 25, 1945.Over 30 of his missions were as group, wing, division, or air force mission commander while serving with the 91st Bomb Group.

He was highly decorated during World War II, having been awarded the DSC, DFC (3 OLC), AM (14 OLC), Croix de Guerre, PH, ACM, World War II Victory Medal, and European–African–Middle Eastern Campaign Medal (8 x Battle Stars).

His success many have been partly due to his preparations for his bombing missions. He thoroughly studied the details of bombing missions and had learned how to operate every piece of equipment on a B-17 Flying Fortress.
