= 322d Expeditionary Reconnaissance Squadron =

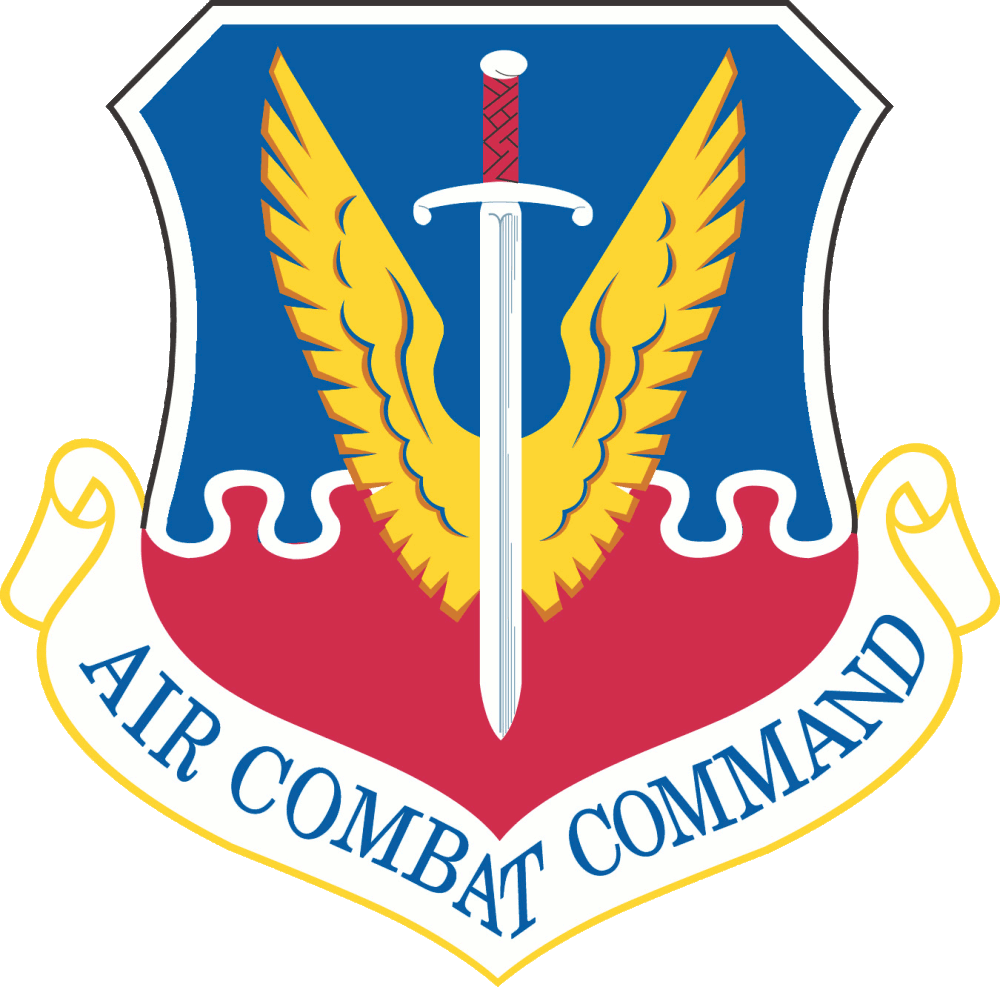
322d Expeditionary Reconnaissance Squadron

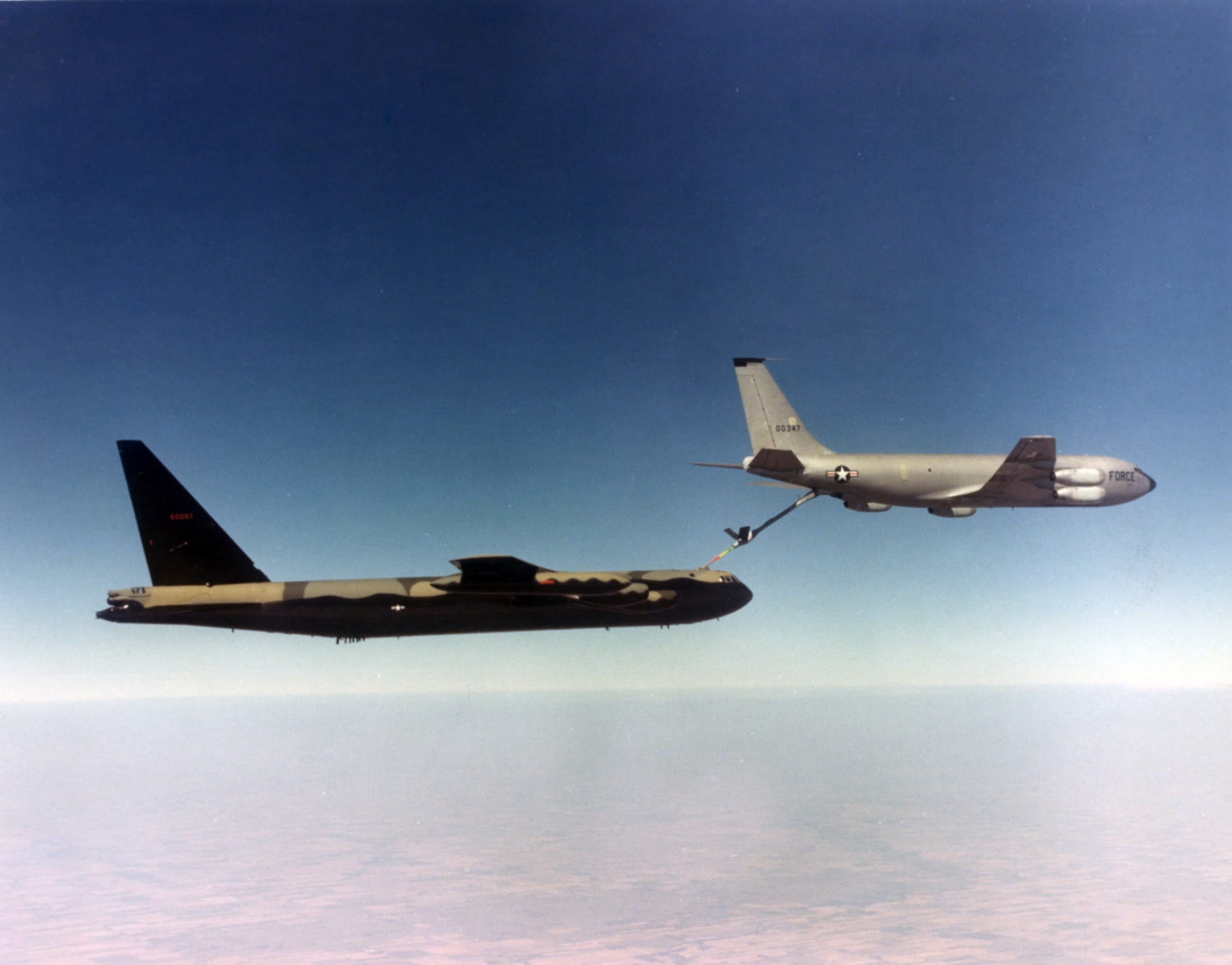
- A KC-135A refuels B-52D during the Vietnam War
- Active: 1942–1945; 1950–1957; 1963–1968
- Country: United States
- Branch: United States Air Force
- Role: Reconnaissance
- Part of: Air Combat Command
- Engagements: European Theater of Operations
- Decorations: Distinguished Unit Citation; Air Force Outstanding Unit Award

Insignia
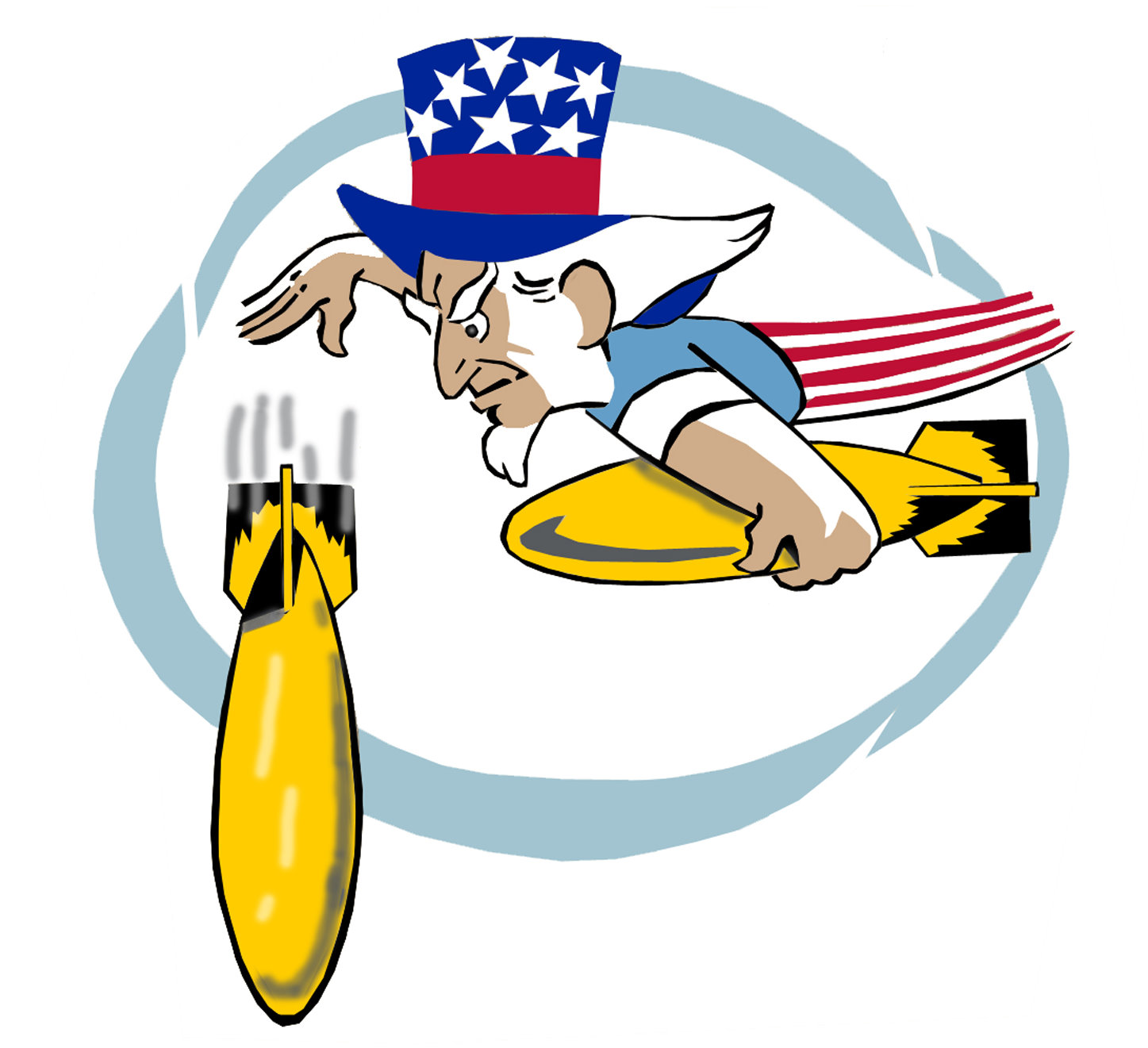
- 322d Bombardment Squadron emblem (Note: Approved 12 October 1942. Description: Over and through an irregular white cloud formation, shaded blue, a caricatured figure of Uncle Sam in flight, wearing a blue plug hat, studded with white stars, rimmed by a red band, blue jacket, and red and white striped trousers, carrying in the left hand a yellow aerial bomb and dropping [another] to base with right hand. Maurer, Combat Units, p. 395.)
- World War II fuselage code: LG

The 322d Expeditionary Reconnaissance Squadron is a provisional unit of the United States Air Force, assigned to Air Combat Command to activate or inactivate as needed.

The squadron was first activated in 1942 as the 322d Bombardment Squadron. After training in the United States, it moved to the European Theater of Operations, where it participated in the strategic bombing campaign against Germany. It was awarded two Distinguished Unit Citations for combat in Germany. Following V-E Day, the squadron returned to the United States and was inactivated in late 1945.

The squadron was redesignated the 322d Strategic Reconnaissance Squadron and activated at Barksdale Air Force Base, Louisiana in 1950. Squadron elements deployed and again saw combat during the Korean War. It was inactivated at Lockbourne Air Force Base, Ohio in 1957. In 1963, it returned to the bombardment role at Glasgow Air Force Base, Montana. It deployed crews and aircraft to Andersen Air Force Base that participated in the Vietnam War. The squadron was inactivated on 25 June 1968 as Glasgow closed and older models of the Boeing B-52 Stratofortress were withdrawn from service.

== History ==
=== World War II ===
==== Organization and training in the United States ====
The squadron was first activated on 15 April 1942 at Harding Field as the 322nd Bombardment Squadron, one of the three original bombardment squadrons of the 91st Bombardment Group. (Note: The group was also assigned a reconnaissance squadron, but this unit was quickly redesignated as the group's fourth bombardment squadron. Maurer, Combat Squadrons, pp. 490–491.) It was equipped with the Boeing B-17 Flying Fortress. It completed Phase I training at MacDill Field, Florida under III Bomber Command, with Phase II and III training at Walla Walla Army Air Field, Washington under II Bomber Command. (Note: Phase I training concentrated on individual training in crewmember specialties. Phase II training emphasized the coordination for the crew to act as a team. The final phase concentrated on operation as a unit. Greer, p. 606.) The squadron's ground echelon left for Fort Dix in early September 1942, then boarded the RMS Queen Mary for transport to England. The air echelon moved to Gowen Field, Idaho on 24 August 1942, and received new B-17s there. It becan flying them from Dow Field, Maine in September, although it was not fully equipped with new aircraft until October.

==== Combat in Europe ====
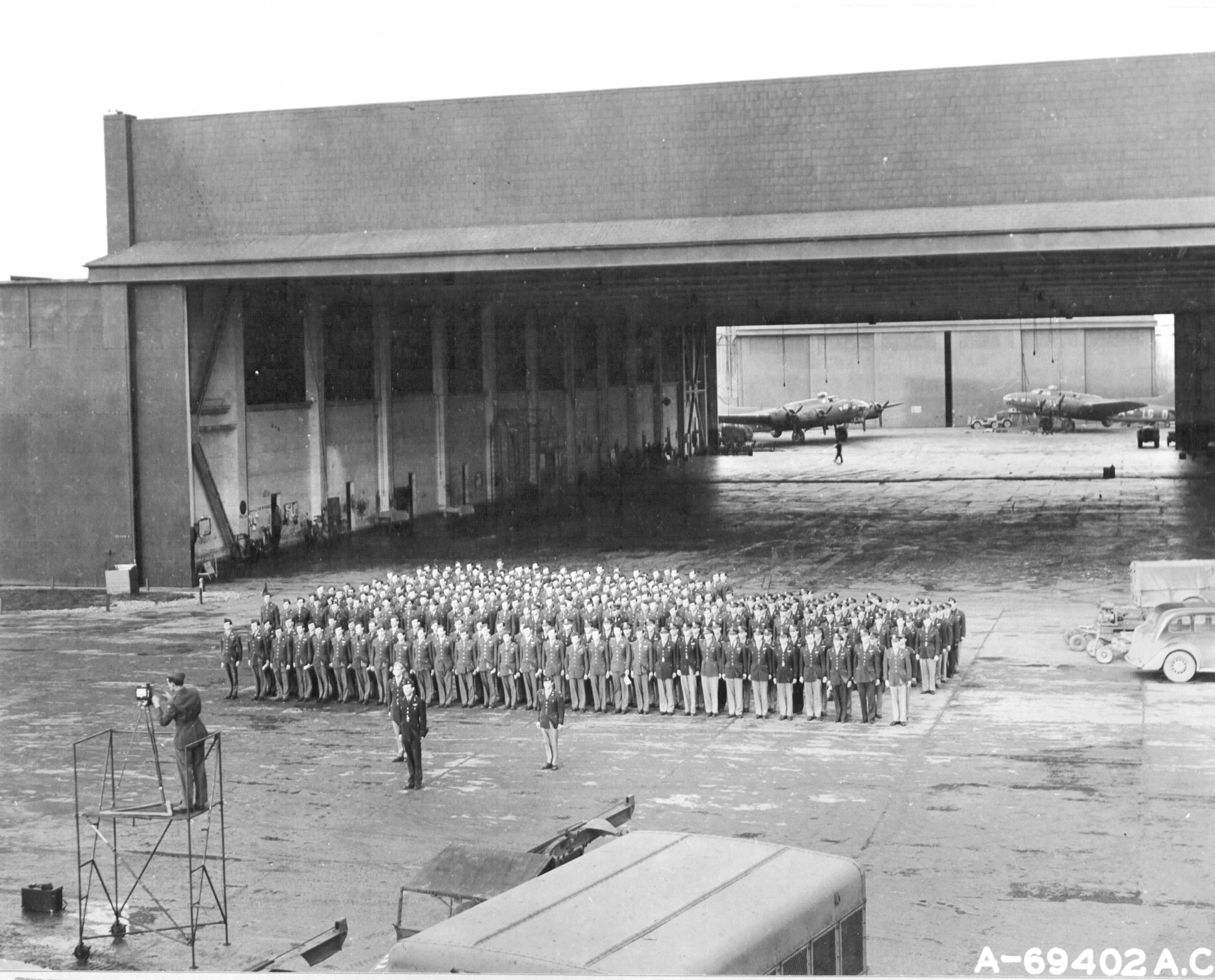
Squadron at RAF Bassingborn about early 1944.

The ground echelon was established temporarily at RAF Kimbolton by 13 September 1942. However, the runways at Kimbolton were not up to handling heavy bombers, and the unit moved to what would be its permanent station in the European Theater of Operations, RAF Bassingbourn, on 14 October 1942. Bassingbourn had been a prewar Royal Air Force station, so the squadron found itself in more comfortable quarters than most of its contemporaries. The squadron primarily engaged in the strategic bombing campaign against Germany, and flew its first mission on 7 November, an attack against submarine pens at Brest, France.

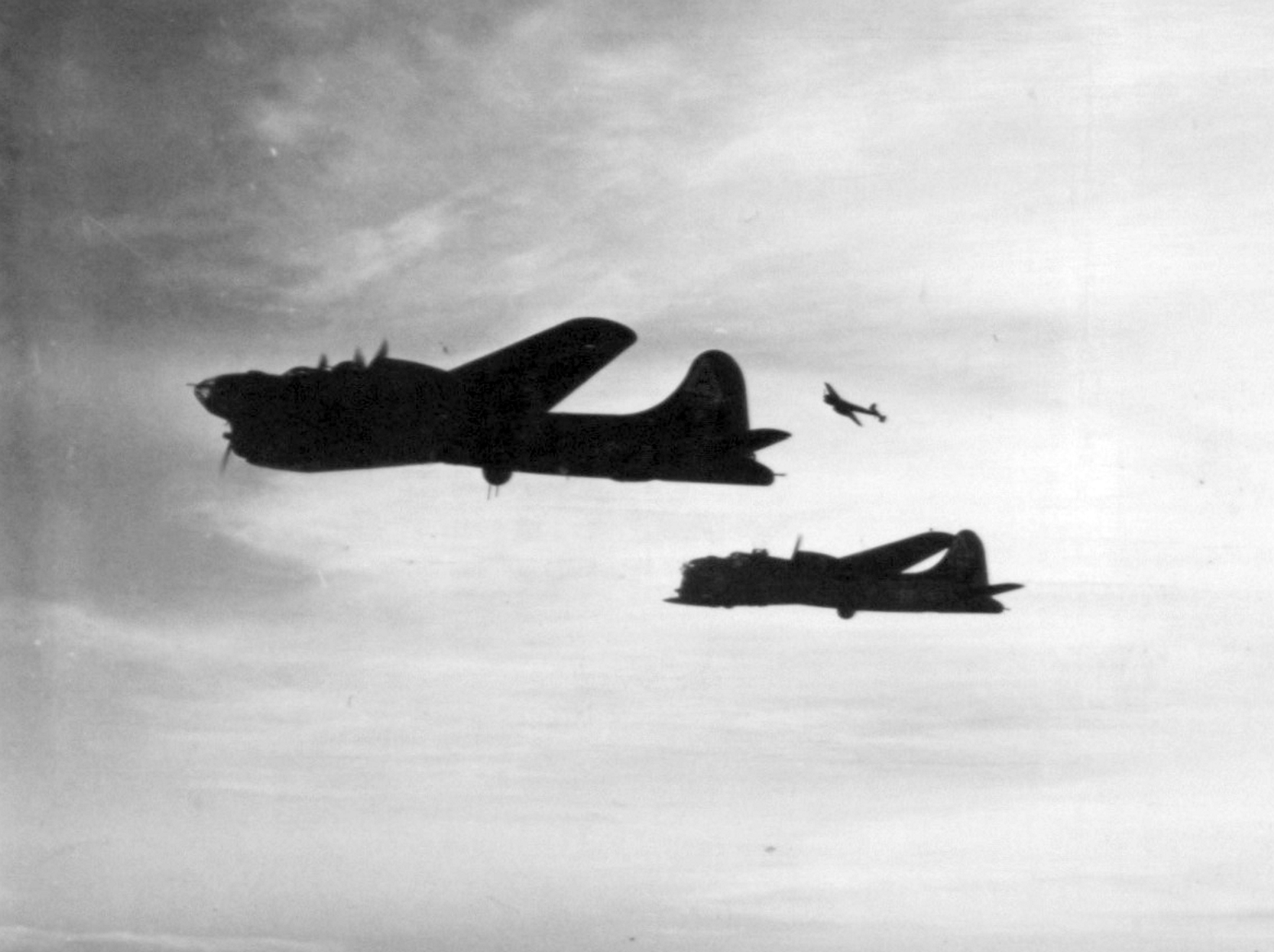
91st Group B-17s attacked by a Messerschmitt Bf 110 in January 1944

Until the middle of 1943, The squadron concentrated its attacks on naval targets, including submarine pens, dockyards, ship construction facilities and harbors, although it also struck airfields, factories, and communications facilities. On 27 January 1943, the unit attacked the Kriegsmarine yard at Wilhelmshaven as part of the first penetration by bombers of VIII Bomber Command to a target in Germany. On 4 March 1943, it attacked marshalling yards at Hamm, Germany despite adverse weather and heavy enemy opposition. For this action, it was awarded its first Distinguished Unit Citation (DUC).

From the middle of 1943 to the end of the war, the squadron concentrated on attacks on German aviation, including attacks on aircraft factories, including ones at Oranienburg and Brussels; airfields at Oldenburg and Villacoublay; the ball bearing plants at Schweinfurt; chemical plants at Leverkusen and Peenemunde; and industrial facilities in Ludwigshafen, Frankfurt am Main and Wilhemshaven. As part of this attack on the German aircraft industry, on 11 January 1944, the squadron penetrated into central Germany, despite bad weather, poor fighter cover, and strong attacks by enemy interceptor aircraft, the unit succeeded in bombing its target, earning a second DUC.

The squadron also performed interdiction and air support missions. It helped prepare for Operation Overlord, the invasion of Normandy, by bombing gun emplacements and troop concentrations near the beachhead area. It aided Operation Cobra, the breakout at Saint Lo, in July 1944 by attacking enemy troop positions. It supported troops on the front lines near Caen in August 1944 and attacked lines of communications near the battlefield during the Battle of the Bulge in December 1944 and January 1945. It attacked airfields, bridges, and railroads to support Operation Lumberjack, the push across the Rhine in Germany, in 1945.

Following V-E Day, the squadron evacuated prisoners of war from German camps. The first B-17 left Bassingbourn for the United States on 27 May 1945. The ground echelon sailed aboard the RMS Queen Elizabeth on 24 June 1945. The squadron was reestablished at Drew Field, Florida in early July, with the intention of deploying it to the Pacific, but it was not fully manned or equipped, and inactivated on 7 November 1945.

=== Cold War ===
==== Strategic reconnaissance ====
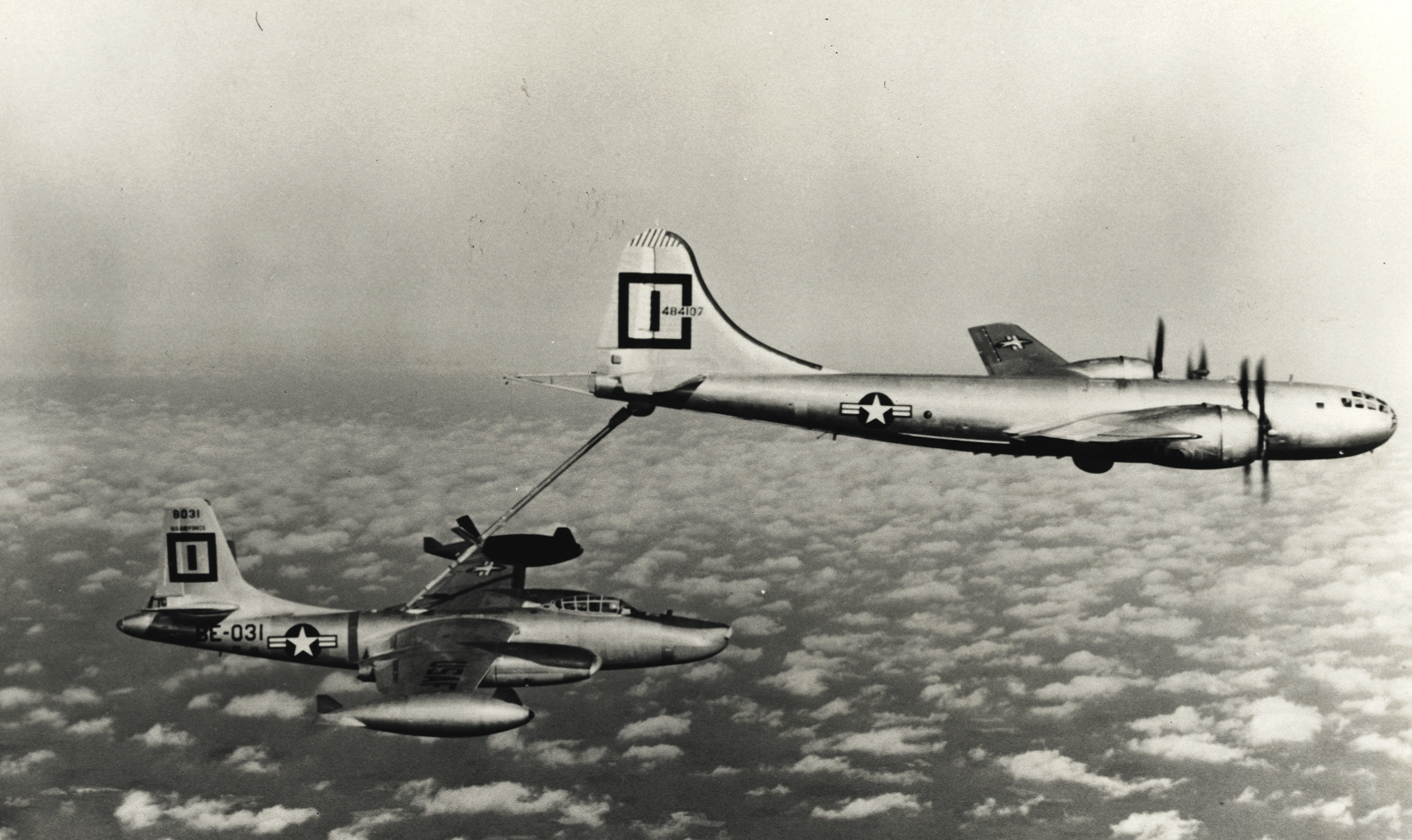
Squadron RB-45C refueling from a KB-29P

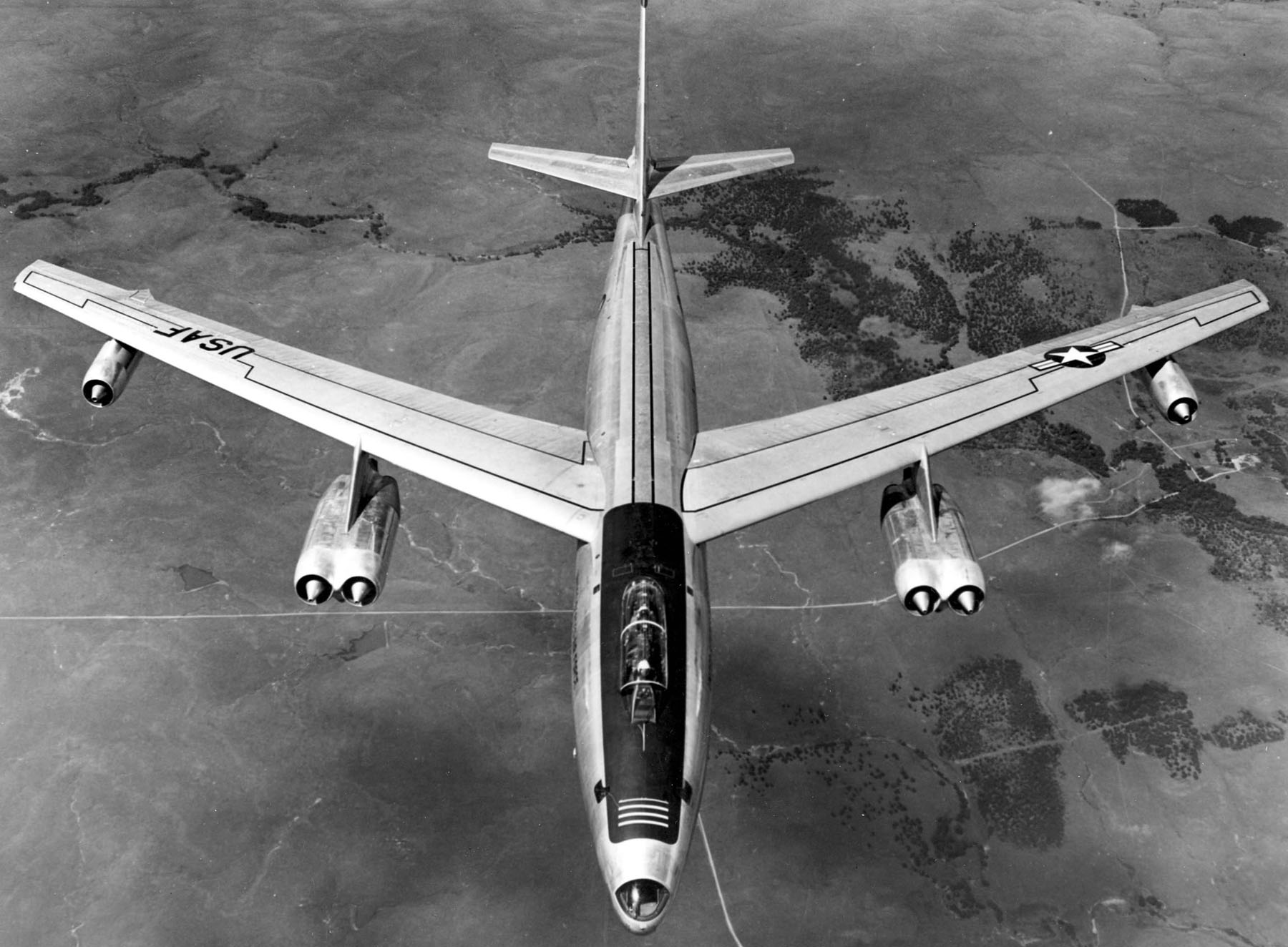
Boeing RB-47E Stratojet

The squadron was redesignated the 322d Strategic Reconnaissance Squadron, activated at Barksdale Air Force Base, Louisiana in July 1950 and assigned to the 91st Strategic Reconnaissance Group. The squadron was initially equipped with Boeing RB-29 Superfortress reconnaissance bombers, but soon converted to the North American RB-45 Tornado jet reconnaissance aircraft, while also operating bomber models of the B-29 and B-45. Elements of the squadron flew reconnaissance and mapping combat missions over Korea until mid-1952. The squadron deployed to Johnson Air Base and Yokota Air Base, Japan from activation until 28 May 1952.

Strategic Air Command (SAC) decided its wing commanders should focus on combat operations, while the air base group commander would manage base housekeeping functions. Under this plan the wing's combat squadrons reported directly to the wing and the intermediate group was eliminated. In February 1951, the 91st Group became nonoperational and the squadron was assigned directly to the 91st Strategic Reconnaissance Wing. In September 1951 the squadron moved to Lockbourne Air Force Base, Ohio, where it re-equipped with Boeing RB-47E Stratojets in 1953. The squadron frequently provided crews and aircraft to detachments of the 91st Wing that performed reconnaissance in overseas areas. Between August and November 1956, most of the squadron was deployed overseas and was operationally controlled by another organization. It continued worldwide reconnaissance missions until inactivating in November 1957.

==== Strategic bombardment ====
SAC bases with large concentrations of bombers made attractive targets. SAC’s response was to break up its wings and scatter their aircraft over a larger number of bases. As part of this dispersal, Sac organized the 4141st Strategic Wing at Glasgow Air Force Base, Montana. The 4141st was a Major Command controlled (MAJCON) wing, which could not carry a permanent history or lineage, and SAC wanted to replace it with a permanent unit. In February 1963, SAC established the 91st Bombardment Wing at Glasgow to replace the 4141st. In this reorganization, the squadron was activated as the 322nd Bombardment Squadron, and absorbed the mission, personnel and equipment of the 326th Bombardment Squadron, which was simultaneousl inactivated.

The squadron trained for global bombing missions and maintained half of its Boeing B-52D Stratofortresses on nuclear alert. In addition, the squadron participated in Operation Chrome Dome, maintaining an airborne force for "airborne alert training."

Starting in 1965, B-52Ds began to be modified with what was referred to as the "Big Belly" modification, which enabled them to carry large amounts of conventional munitions. On 11 September 1966, most of the squadron deployed to the Western Pacific, where it flew Operation Arc Light combat missions over Southeast Asia from Andersen Air Force Base, continuing until 31 March 1967, when its forces returned to Glasgow. In response to the Pueblo Incident it deployed to Kadena Air Base, Okinawa on 15 February 1968, returning on 30 April 1968, when the squadron became non-operational until was inactivated on 25 June 1968 as Glasgow closed.

=== Expeditionary operations ===
The squadron was converted to provisional status on 22 July 2010 and redesignated the 322nd Expeditionary Reconnaissance Squadron and assigned to Air Combat Command to activate or inactivate as needed for continency operations.

== Lineage ==
- Constituted as the 322d Bombardment Squadron (Heavy) on 28 January 1942

Activated on 15 April 1942

- Redesignated 322d Bombardment Squadron, Heavy on 20 August 1943

Inactivated on 7 November 1945

- Redesignated 322d Strategic Reconnaissance Squadron, Medium on 23 May 1950

Activated on 6 July 1950
Inactivated on 8 November 1957

- Redesignated 322d Bombardment Squadron, Heavy and activated on 15 November 1962 (not organized)

Organized on 1 February 1963
Inactivated on 25 June 1968

- Redesignated 322d Expeditionary Reconnaissance Squadron on 22 July 2010

=== Assignments ===
- 91st Bombardment Group, 15 April 1942 – 7 November 1945
- 91st Strategic Reconnaissance Group, 6 July 1950 (attached to 91st Strategic Reconnaissance Wing after 10 February 1951)
- 91st Strategic Reconnaissance Wing, 28 May 1952 – 8 November 1957
- Strategic Air Command, 15 November 1962 (not organized)
- 91st Bombardment Wing, 1 February 1963 – 25 June 1968
- Air Combat Command to activate or inactivate as needed

=== Stations ===
- Harding Field, Louisiana, 15 April 1942
- MacDill Field, Florida, 13 May 1942
- Walla Walla Army Air Base, Washington, 22 June - 24 August 1942
- RAF Kimbolton (Station 117), England, 13 September 1942 (ground echelon), early October 1942 (air echelon)
- RAF Bassingbourn (Station 121), England, 14 October 1942 – 22 June 1945
- Drew Field, Florida, 3 July - 7 November 1945
- Barksdale Air Force Base, Louisiana, 6 July 1950
- Lockbourne Air Force Base, Ohio, 11 September 1951 – 8 November 1957
- Glasgow Air Force Base, Montana, 1 February 1963 – 25 June 1968

=== Aircraft ===
- Boeing B-17 Flying Fortress, 1942–1945
- Boeing RB-29 Superfortress, 1950
- Boeing B-29 Superfortress, 1950
- North American RB-45C Tornado, 1950–1953
- North American B-45C Tornado, 1950–1953
- Boeing RB-47E Stratojet, 1953–1957
- Boeing B-52D Stratofortress, 1963–1968

=== Awards and campaigns ===
Award streamer	Award	Dates	Notes
	Presidential Unit Citation	Hamm, Germany 4 March 1943	322nd Bombardment Squadron
	Presidential Unit Citation	Germany, 11 January 1944	322nd Bombardment Squadron
	Air Force Outstanding Unit Award	8 September 1953–8 November 1957	322nd Strategic Reconnaissance Squadron
	Air Force Outstanding Unit Award	1 July 1965–30 June 1966	322nd Bombardment Squadron
	Air Force Outstanding Unit Award	1 July 1966–30 June 1967	322nd Bombardment Squadron
	Air Force Outstanding Unit Award	1 February–1 March 1968	322nd Bombardment Squadron
	Air Force Outstanding Unit Award	2 March–15 April 1968	322nd Bombardment Squadron

Campaign Streamer	Campaign	Dates	Notes
	Air Offensive, Europe	13 September 1942 – 5 June 1944	322nd Bombardment Squadron
	Air Combat, EAME Theater	13 September 1942 – 11 May 1945	322nd Bombardment Squadron
	Normandy	6 June 1944 – 24 July 1944	322nd Bombardment Squadron
	Northern France	25 July 1944 – 14 September 1944	322nd Bombardment Squadron
	Rhineland	15 September 1944 – 21 March 1945	322nd Bombardment Squadron
	Ardennes-Alsace	16 December 1944 – 25 January 1945	322nd Bombardment Squadron
	Central Europe	22 March 1944 – 21 May 1945	322nd Bombardment Squadron

== See also ==
- List of B-52 Units of the United States Air Force
- B-17 Flying Fortress units of the United States Army Air Forces
- List of B-29 Superfortress operators
- List of B-47 units of the United States Air Force
- List of United States Air Force reconnaissance squadrons
