= 701st Tactical Air Support Squadron =

401st Bombardment Squadron
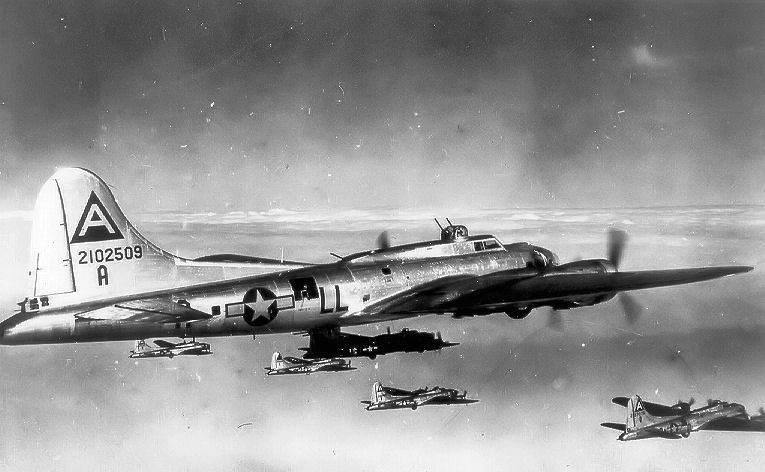
- Squadron B-17 Flying Fortress (Note: Aircraft is Boeing B-17G-50-BO Flying Fortress, serial 42-102509, The Liberty Run. This airplane was shot down by antiaircraft artillery over Leipzig, Germany on 20 July and its crew made prisoners of war. Missing Air Crew Report 7274.)
- Active: 1942–1945; 1967–1980
- Country: United States
- Branch: United States Air Force
- Role: tactical air support
- Nickname: Weight Lifters (1971-1980)
- Engagements: European Theater of World War II
- Decorations: Distinguished Unit Citation

Insignia
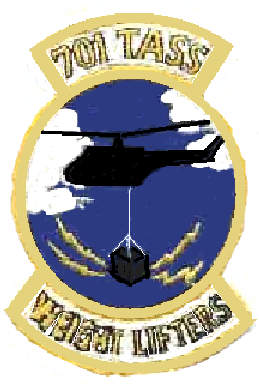
- 701st Tactical Air Support Squadron emblem

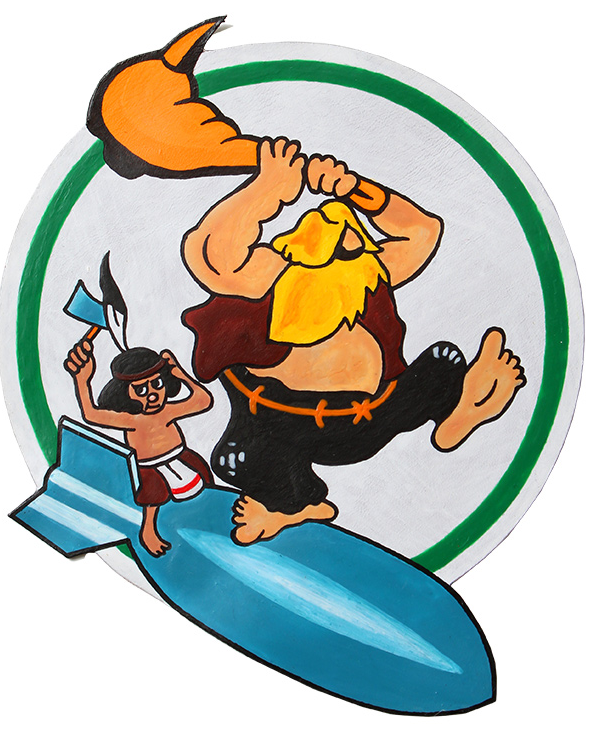
- 401st Bombardment Squadron emblem (Note: Approved 18 October 1944. Description: The comic strip character "Hairless Joe" proper, wearing red brown patched trousers and black sleeveless jacket, grasping and holding aloft a very large yellow club with spike throughend, balancing on the right foot on a large light turquoise blue aerial bomb, and the comic strip character "Lonesome Polecat" proper, wearing a red brown breechcloth and head band, having one white feather trimmed black, in the headdress, seated astride the aerial bomb behind "Hairless Joe" and holding aloft in the right hand a light turquoise blue axe with yellow handle, all in front of a white disc within a green annulet, edged white. Maurer, Combat Squadrons, p. 491.)
- WW II squadron code: LL
- WW II group marking: Triangle A

The 701st Tactical Air Support Squadron is an inactive United States Air Force unit. It was last assigned to the 601st Tactical Air Control Wing at Bergstrom Air Force Base, Texas, where flew helicopters to support Tactical Air Control System units from 1967 until it was inactivated on 31 January 1980.

The first predecessor of the squadron was activated during World War II as the 401st Bombardment Squadron. After training in the United States, it moved to the European Theater of Operations, where it participated in the strategic bombing campaign against Germany. It was awarded two Distinguished Unit Citations for combat in Germany. Following V-E Day, the squadron returned to the United States and was inactivated in late 1945. In 1985, the two squadrons were consolidated into a single unit.

== History ==
=== World War II ===
==== Organization and training in the United States ====
The squadron was first activated on 15 April 1942 at Harding Field as the 11th Reconnaissance Squadron. Since a reorganization of General Headquarters Air Force in September 1936, each bombardment group of the Army Air Forces (AAF) had an attached reconnaissance squadron, which operated the same aircraft as that group's assigned bombardment squadrons. That arrangement continued for units like the 39th that were designated as medium and heavy bombardment units. This distinction was eliminated a week after the squadron was activated, when it was redesignated the 401st Bombardment Squadron, along with the Army Air Forces' other medium and heavy reconnaissance units. It completed First Phase training at MacDill Field under Third Air Force, with Second and Third Phase training at Walla Walla Army Air Field under Second Air Force in Washington. The squadron's ground echelon left for Fort Dix in early September 1942, then boarded the RMS Queen Mary for transport to England. The air echelon moved to Gowen Field, Idaho on 24 August 1942, and began receiving new B-17s there. It becan flying them from Dow Field, Maine in September, although it was not fully equipped with new aircraft until October.

==== Combat in Europe ====
The ground echelon was established temporarily at RAF Kimbolton by 13 September 1942. However, the runways at Kimbolton were not up to handling heavy bombers, and the unit moved to what would be its permanent station in the European Theater of Operations, RAF Bassingbourn, on 14 October 1942. Bassingbourn had been a prewar Royal Air Force station, so the squadron found itself in more comfortable quarters than most of its contemporaries. The squadron primarily engaged in the strategic bombing campaign against Germany, and flew its first mission on 7 November, an attack against submarine pens at Brest, France.

Until the middle of 1943, The squadron concentrated its attacks on naval targets, including submarine pens, dockyards, ship construction facilities and harbors, although it also struck airfields, factories, and communications facilities. On 27 January 1943, the unit attacked the Kriegsmarine yard at Wilhelmshaven as part of the first penetration by bombers of VIII Bomber Command to a target in Germany. On 4 March 1943, it attacked marshalling yards at Hamm, Germany despite adverse weather and heavy enemy opposition. For this action, it was awarded its first Distinguished Unit Citation (DUC).

Losses to the first units of VII Bomber Command in this period, when fighter cover was limited, were severe. The 401st flew in the "vertical wedge" formation in an attack on Bremen on 17 April. The squadron's six B-17s formed the "low squadron", the most vulnerable part of the formation. In intense fighter attacks all six were shot down. While the squadron had entered combat in November 1942 with a strength of 90 aircrew, by February 1943, it had lost 115 crewmembers.

From the middle of 1943 to the end of the war, the squadron concentrated on attacks on German aviation, including attacks on aircraft factories, including ones at Oranienburg and Brussels; airfields at Oldenburg and Villacoublay; the ball bearing plants at Schweinfurt; chemical plants at Leverkusen and Peenemunde; and industrial facilities in Ludwigshafen, Frankfurt am Main and Wilhemshaven. As part of this attack on the German aircraft industry, on 11 January, the squadron penetrated into central Germany, despite bad weather, poor fighter cover, and strong attacks by enemy interceptor aircraft, the unit succeeded in bombing its target, earning a second DUC.

The squadron also performed interdiction and air support missions. It helped prepare for Operation Overlord, the invasion of Normandy, by bombing gun emplacements and troop concentrations near the beachhead area. It aided Operation Cobra, the breakout at Saint Lo, in July 1944 by attacking enemy troop positions. It supported troops on the front lines near Caen in August 1944 and attacked lines of communications near the battlefield during the Battle of the Bulge in December 1944 and January 1945. It attacked airfields, bridges, and railroads to support Operation Lumberjack, the push across the Rhine in Germany, in 1945.

Following V-E Day, the squadron evacuated prisoners of war from German camps. The first B-17 left Bassingbourn for the United States on 27 May 1945. The ground echelon sailed aboard the RMS Queen Elizabeth on 24 June 1945. The squadron was reestablished at Drew Field, Florida in early July, with the intention of deploying it to the Pacific, but it was not fully manned or equipped, and inactivated on 7 November 1945.

=== Tactical Air Control System ===
In April 1967, the 701st Tactical Air Support Squadron activated at Bergstrom Air Force Base, Texas to provide light airlift and forward control support for the Tactical Air Control System, the deployable command and control system of Tactical Air Command under the control of Twelfth Air Force. It continued this mission, maintaining readiness to deploy and participating in exercises for the next thirteen years until inactivating in January 1980.

It was assigned to the 602nd Tactical Air Control Group, later upgraded into the 602nd Tactical Air Control Wing.

In 1985, the United States Air Force consolidated these squadrons into a single unit, but the unit has remained inactive since consolidation.

== Lineage ==
401st Bombardment Squadron

- Constituted as the 11th Reconnaissance Squadron (Heavy) on 28 January 1942

Activated on 15 April 1942
Redesignated 401st Bombardment Squadron (Heavy) on 22 April 1942
Redesignated 401st Bombardment Squadron, Heavy on 20 Aug 1943
Inactivated on 7 November 1945

- Consolidated 19 September 1985 with the 701st Tactical Air Support Squadron as the 701st Tactical Air Support Squadron

701st Tactical Air Support Squadron

- Constituted as the 701st Tactical Air Support Squadron, activated, and organized on 3 April 1967
- Redesignated 701st Tactical Air Support Squadron, Helicopter on 1 January 1971

Inactivated on 31 January 1980

- Consolidated 19 September 1985 with the 401st Bombardment Squadron

=== Assignments ===
- 91st Bombardment Group, 15 April 1942 – 7 November 1945
- 602nd Tactical Control Group, 3 April 1967
- 4467th Tactical Air Control Group, 1 July 1969
- 71st Tactical Air Support Group, 1 January 1970
- 602nd Tactical Air Control Group (later 602nd Tactical Air Control Wing), 1 June 1974 – 31 January 1980

=== Stations ===
- Harding Field, Louisiana, 15 April 1942
- MacDill Field, Florida, 13 May 1942
- Walla Walla Army Air Base, Washington, 22 June – 24 August 1942
- RAF Kimbolton (AAF-117), England, 13 September 1942
- RAF Bassingbourn (AAF-121), England, 14 October 1942 – 22 June 1945
- Drew Field, Florida, 3 July 1945 – 7 November 1945
- Bergstrom Air Force Base, Texas, 3 April 1967 – 31 January 1980

=== Aircraft ===
- Boeing B-17 Flying Fortress, 1942–1945

=== Awards and campaigns ===
Award streamer	Award	Dates	Notes
	Presidential Unit Citation	Hamm, Germany 4 March 1943	401st Bombardment Squadron
	Presidential Unit Citation	Germany, 11 January 1944	401st Bombardment Squadron

Campaign Streamer	Campaign	Dates	Notes
	Air Offensive, Europe	13 September 1942–5 June 1944	401st Bombardment Squadron
	Air Combat, EAME Theater	13 September 1942–11 May 1945	401st Bombardment Squadron
	Normandy	6 June 1944–24 July 1944	401st Bombardment Squadron
	Northern France	25 July 1944–14 September 1944	401st Bombardment Squadron
	Rhineland	15 September 1944–21 March 1945	401st Bombardment Squadron
	Ardennes-Alsace	16 December 1944–25 January 1945	401st Bombardment Squadron
	Central Europe	22 March 1944–21 May 1945	401st Bombardment Squadron
