= Tokyo tanks =

Type of aviation fuel tank

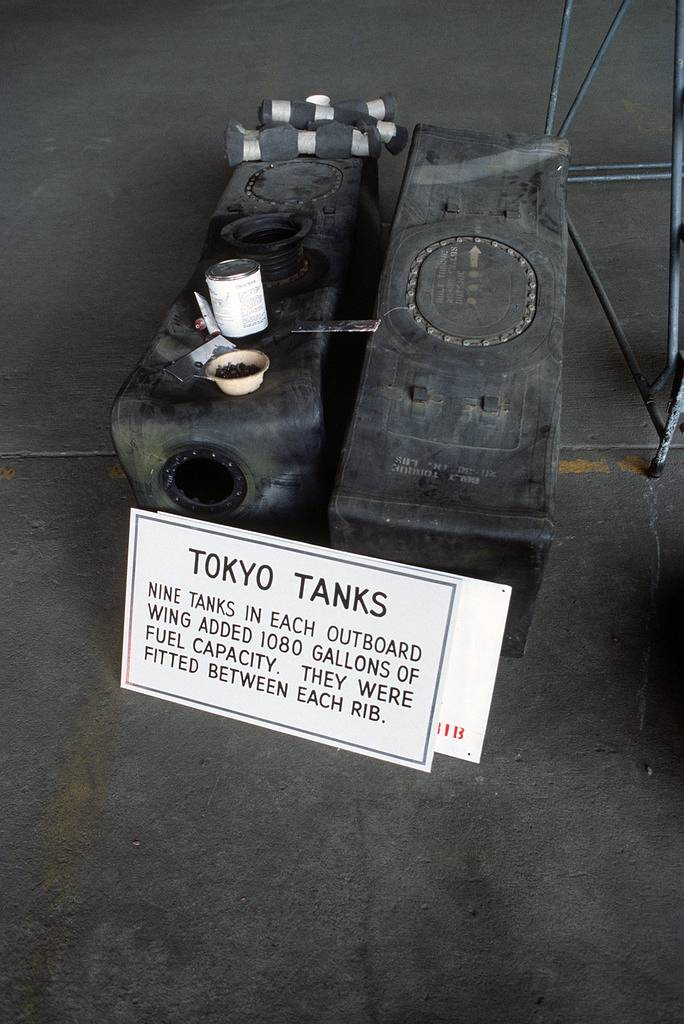
A pair of Tokyo tanks on display in 1988

Tokyo tanks were internally mounted self-sealing fuel tanks used in the Boeing B-17 Flying Fortress and Consolidated B-24 Liberator bombers during World War II. The tanks increased the B-17's total range at combat weight with 4,000–5,000 pounds (1,800–2,300 kg) of bombs by about 1,000 miles (1,600 km) and the combat radius was doubled to about 650 miles (1,050 km). Although nicknamed "Tokyo" tanks, the name was hyperbole, as no B-17 had the range to bomb Japan from an allied base during the war.

== Description ==
These fuel tanks consisted of 18 removable containers, called cells, made of a rubberized compound, installed inside the wings of the airplane, nine to each side. The wings of the B-17 consisted of an "inboard wing" structure mounted to the fuselage which held the engines and flaps, and an "outboard wing" structure joined to the inboard wing and carrying the ailerons. The Tokyo tanks were installed on either side of the joint (a load-bearing point) where the two wing portions were connected.

Five cells, totaling 270 US gallons (1,000 L) capacity, sat side by side in the outboard wing and were joined by a fuel line to the main wing tank, which delivered fuel to the outboard engine. The sixth cell was located in the space where the wing sections joined, and the remaining three cells were located side-by-side in the inboard wing; these four cells delivered 270 US gallons (1,000 L) of fuel to the feeder tank for the inboard engine. The same arrangement was repeated on the opposite wing. The Tokyo tanks added 1,080 US gallons (4,100 L) of fuel to the 1,700 US gallons (6,400 L) already carried in the six regular wing tanks. 820 US gallons (3,100 L) could be carried in an auxiliary tank that could be mounted in the bomb bay, for a combined total of 3,600 US gallons (14,000 L).

All B-17F aircraft built by Boeing from Block 80, by Douglas from Block 25, and by Vega from Block 30 were equipped with Tokyo tanks, and the entire run of B-17Gs by all three manufacturers had Tokyo tanks. B-17s with factory-mounted Tokyo tanks were first introduced to the Eighth Air Force in England in April 1943 with the arrival of the 94th Bomb Group and 95th Bomb Group, equipped with new aircraft. By June 1943, aircraft that were so equipped began to appear in greater numbers as replacement aircraft and with new groups moving to England. Beginning in July 1943, all replacement aircraft that did not have the tanks already installed were equipped before issue.

Use of the term "Tokyo tanks" appeared in American newspapers by mid-November 1943, in a first-person account of a bombing raid authored by Beirne Lay Jr., then a lieutenant colonel in the United States Army Air Forces.

Although the tanks were removable, this could only be done by first removing the wing panels, and so was not a routine maintenance task. A drawback to the tanks was that there was no means of measuring remaining fuel quantity within the cells. Fuel was moved from the cells to the engine feeder tanks by opening control valves within the bomb bay so that the fuel drained by gravity. Although the tanks were specified as self-sealing, vapor buildup within partially-drained tanks made them explosive hazards in combat, such as when struck by flak or cannon shells.

== Sources ==
- Bishop, Cliff T. (1986). Fortresses of the Big Triangle First. East Anglia Books. pp. 50–51. ASIN B002CEJICS. ISBN 1-869987-00-4.
