= 742nd Missile Squadron =

US Air Force unit

742d Missile Squadron

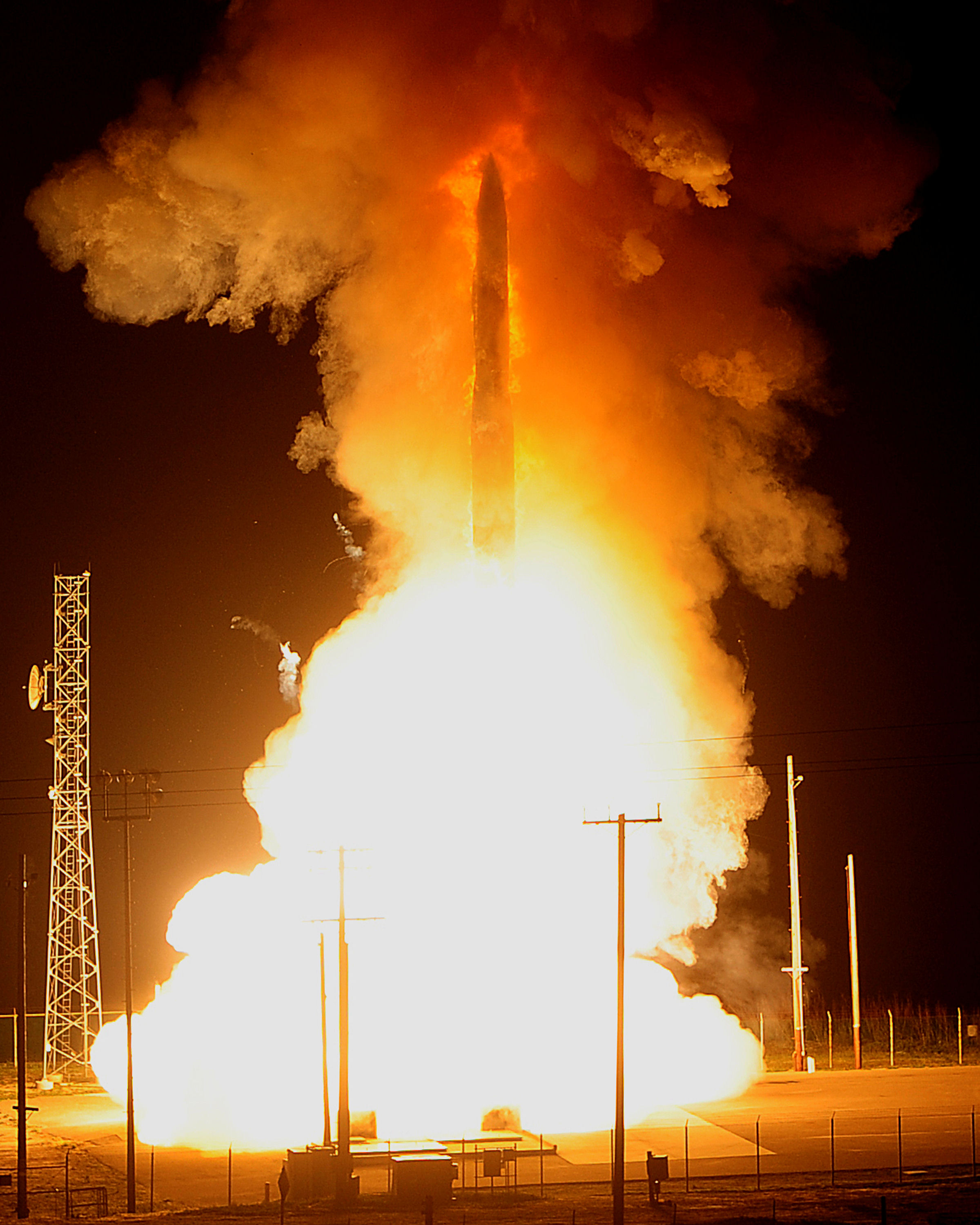
- LGM-30G Minuteman III test launch at Vandenberg AFB, California
- Active: 1943–1945; 1947–1949; 1956–1957; 1962–present
- Country: United States
- Branch: United States Air Force
- Role: Intercontinental ballistic missile
- Part of: Air Force Global Strike Command
- Garrison/HQ: Minot Air Force Base, North Dakota
- Nickname: Wolfpack
- Motto: Clavis Pacis (Latin for 'The Key to Peace')
- Engagements: Mediterranean Theater of Operations
- Decorations: Distinguished Unit Citation; Air Force Outstanding Unit Award

Commanders
- Current commander: Lt. Col. Jake Lusson

Insignia
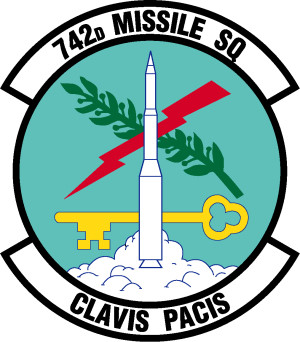
- 742d Missile Squadron emblem (Note: Modified 4 November 1998 from emblem approved 4 May 1964. Description: Issuing from the base of a blue disc is a white cloud formation detailed Air Force blue. Directly above is an Air Force yellow key above which, arched from lower left to upper right, is a green olive branch over a red lightning bolt. The lightning bolt angles from upper right to lower left. Over all these is a white missile detailed Air Force blue. Below the emblem is a white scroll edged Air Force blue bearing the motto. Significance: The key alludes to the role of missiles as deterrents as well as a method of unleashing destruction. The lightning bolt also symbolizes destructive power but the olive branch depicts the desire not to use that power but to maintain peace. The cloud formation and blue background represent the sky.)

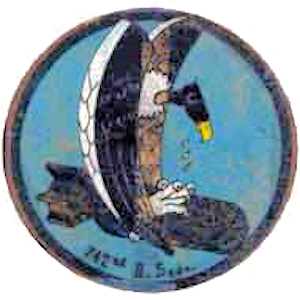
- 742d Bombardment Squadron emblem (Note: This emblem was apparently never approved. See Maurer, Combat Squadrons, p. 731 (no approved emblem as of 1963).)

The 742d Missile Squadron is a United States Air Force unit stationed at Minot Air Force Base, North Dakota. The squadron is equipped with the LGM-30G Minuteman III intercontinental ballistic missile, with a mission of nuclear deterrence.

The squadron was first activated as the 742d Bombardment Squadron in June 1943. After training in the United States with the Consolidated B-24 Liberator bombers, the 742d deployed to the Mediterranean Theater of Operations, participating in the strategic bombing campaign against Germany. It earned two Distinguished Unit Citations for its combat operations. Following V-E Day, it remained in Italy without its flight echelon until inactivating in September 1945

The squadron was activated in the reserve in 1947, but apparently was not fully manned or equipped before inactivating in June 1949 and transferring its resources to another unit. It was redesignated the 742d Fighter-Day Squadron and activated, but did not become operational before inactivating in July 1957. In November 1962 it was organized as the 742d Strategic Missile Squadron, an LGM-30B Minuteman I squadron. In 1971 it upgraded to the Minuteman III, and is currently a part of the 91st Operations Group.

== Mission ==
The 742d Missile Squadron controls and maintains 50 launch facilities and 5 missile alert facilities. The squadron is divided into missile operations flights, which are responsible for day-to-day operations, maintenance, and security, and an operations support flight, which is responsible for ensuring the readiness of the missile alert facilities.

== History ==
=== World War II ===
==== Training in the United States ====
The squadron was first activated at Alamogordo Army Air Field, New Mexico on 1 June 1943 as the 742d Bombardment Squadron, one of the four squadrons of the 455th Bombardment Group. The initial cadre for the squadron was drawn from the 302d Bombardment Group. In July, a group cadre was given advanced tactical training by the Army Air Forces School of Applied Tactics at Orlando Army Air Base and Pinecastle Army Air Field, Florida. After organizing at Alamogordo, the squadron moved to Utah, where the ground echelon was stationed at Kearns Army Air Base, although flying operations were based at Salt Lake City Army Air Base. After completing training at Langley Field, Virginia, the squadron departed the United States for the Mediterranean Theater of Operations in December 1943. The air echelon began staging through Mitchel Field, New York to ferry their Liberators via the southern ferry route. The ground echelon sailed on the SS William T. Barry.

==== Combat operations ====
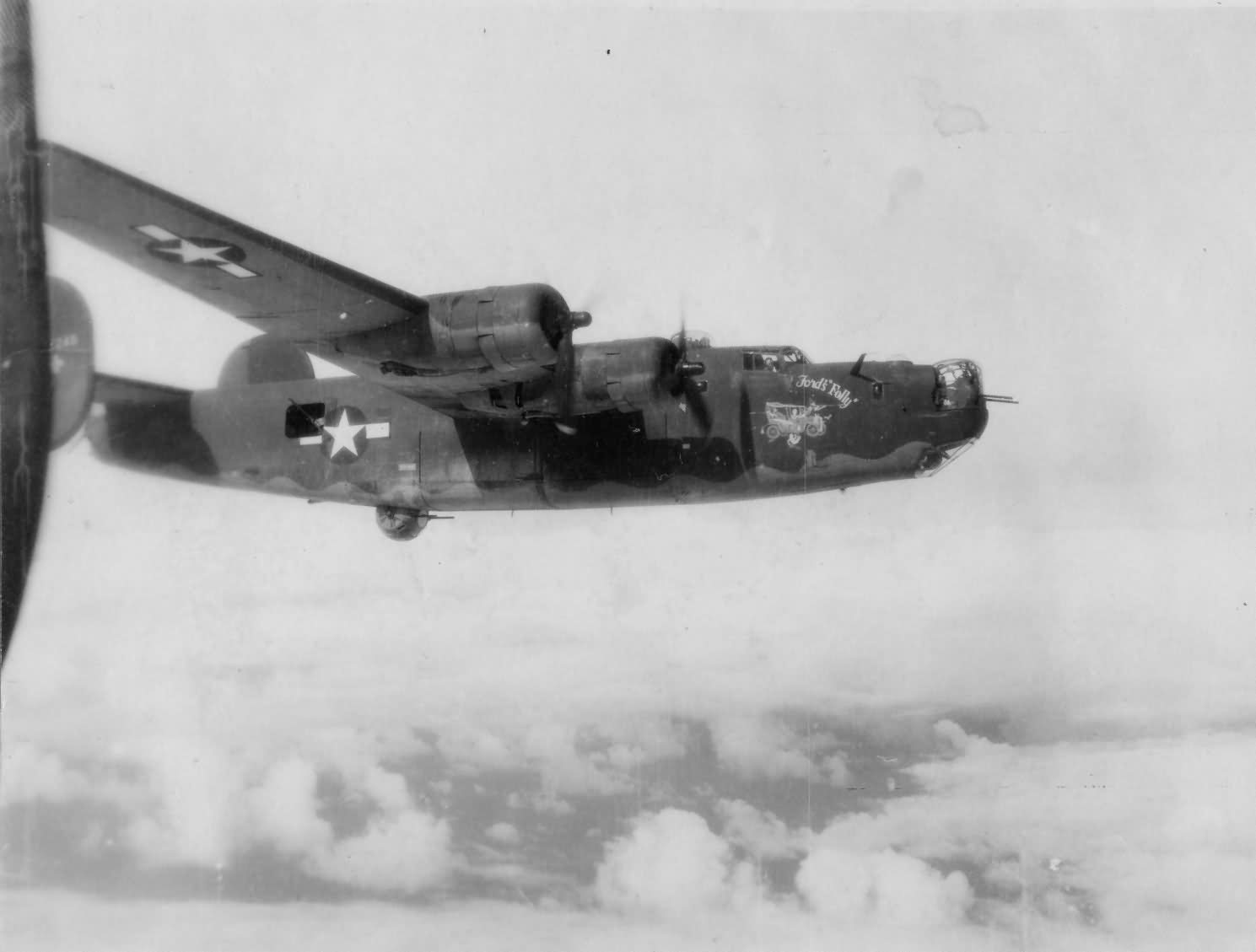
455th Bomb Group B-24H Liberator (Note: Aircraft is Ford Motors built Consolidated B-24H-10-FO Liberator, serial 42-52249, Fords Folly. This plane was shot down over Sichelbach, Austria on 16 June 1944. Baugher, Joe (14 May 2023). "1942 USAF Serial Numbers". Joe Baugher. Missing Air Crew Report 6956.)

The air echelon of the squadron was delayed in Tunisia and was not entirely lodged at the squadron's combat station of San Giovanni Airfield, Italy until 1 February 1944, and the squadron flew its first mission that month. The squadron was engaged primarily in the strategic bombing campaign against Germany, attacking targets like airfields, factories, oil refineries, harbors, marshalling yards in Italy, France, Germany, Austria, Hungary, Romania, and Yugoslavia.

On 2 April 1944, the squadron attacked a ball bearing plant at Steyr, Austria for which it earned a Distinguished Unit Citation (DUC). The primary target, the Daimler-Pusch aircraft engine factory was obscured by clouds, so the unit attacked the nearby ball bearing plant although attacks by an estimated 75 twin engine fighters continued through the bomb run and heavy, accurate flak was encountered. The squadron lost two Liberators in the attack, but claimed the destruction of six enemy aircraft. Five crewmembers from one of the B-24s lost in the attack bailed out in territory controlled by Yugoslav Partisans and were able to evade German forces and returned to the squadron a month after the attack.

On 26 June 1944, the squadron encountered fighter opposition that was described as the strongest Fifteenth Air Force had encountered to date, and which destroyed several Liberators of the 455th Group, which was leading the 304th Bombardment Wing on the raid. On this mission, the squadron suffered its heaviest losses of the war, with six planes lost to enemy action. Only one of the squadron's Liberators that reached the target returned safely. The squadron pressed its attack on an oil refinery at Moosbierbaum, Austria, for which it received a second DUC.

The squadron provided air support to ground forces in Operation Shingle, the landings at Anzio and the Battle of Monte Cassino in the spring of 1944. It knocked out coastal defenses to clear the way for Operation Dragoon, the invasion of southern France in September. As Axis forces were withdrawing from the Balkan peninsula in the fall of 1944, the squadron bombed marshalling yards, troop concentrations and airfields to slow their retreat. It flew air interdiction missions to support Operation Grapeshot, the Spring 1945 offensive in Northern Italy.

The squadron flew its last combat mission on 25 April 1945 against rail yards at Linz, Austria. Following the surrender of German forces in Italy, it flew some supply missions and transported personnel to ports and airfields for shipment back to the United States. Most of the air echelon returned to the United States, ferrying their aircraft in June. Many of the squadron's remaining personnel were transferred to other units in the 304th Bombardment Wing for shipment back to the United States, while the squadron remained in Italy, serving as a replacement depot. The last of the air echelon departed Italy in July and the squadron was inactivated on 9 September 1945.

=== Air Force reserve ===
The squadron was reactivated as a reserve unit under Air Defense Command (ADC) at Hensley Field, Texas in June 1947, where its training was supervised by ADC's 4122d AAF Base Unit (later the 2596th Air Force Reserve Training Center). It was nominally a very heavy bomber unit, but the squadron does not appear to have been fully manned or equipped while a reserve unit. In 1948 Continental Air Command (ConAC) assumed responsibility for managing reserve and Air National Guard units from ADC. President Truman's reduced 1949 defense budget required reductions in the number of units in the Air Force. ConAC also reorganized its reserve units under the wing base organization system in June 1949. As a result, the squadron was inactivated and its personnel and equipment were absorbed by elements of the 443d Troop Carrier Wing, which was activated simultaneously at Hensley Field.

=== Tactical Air Command ===
The squadron was redesignated the 742d Fighter-Day Squadron and activated at Myrtle Beach Air Force Base, South Carolina in July 1956 as Tactical Air Command planned to organize a second North American F-100 Super Sabre wing there. Some personnel were assigned to the unit, but it never became operational with aircraft. It was inactivated in July 1957 and its few personnel assigned were reassigned to elements of the 354th Fighter-Day Wing.

=== Intercontinental ballistic missile squadron ===
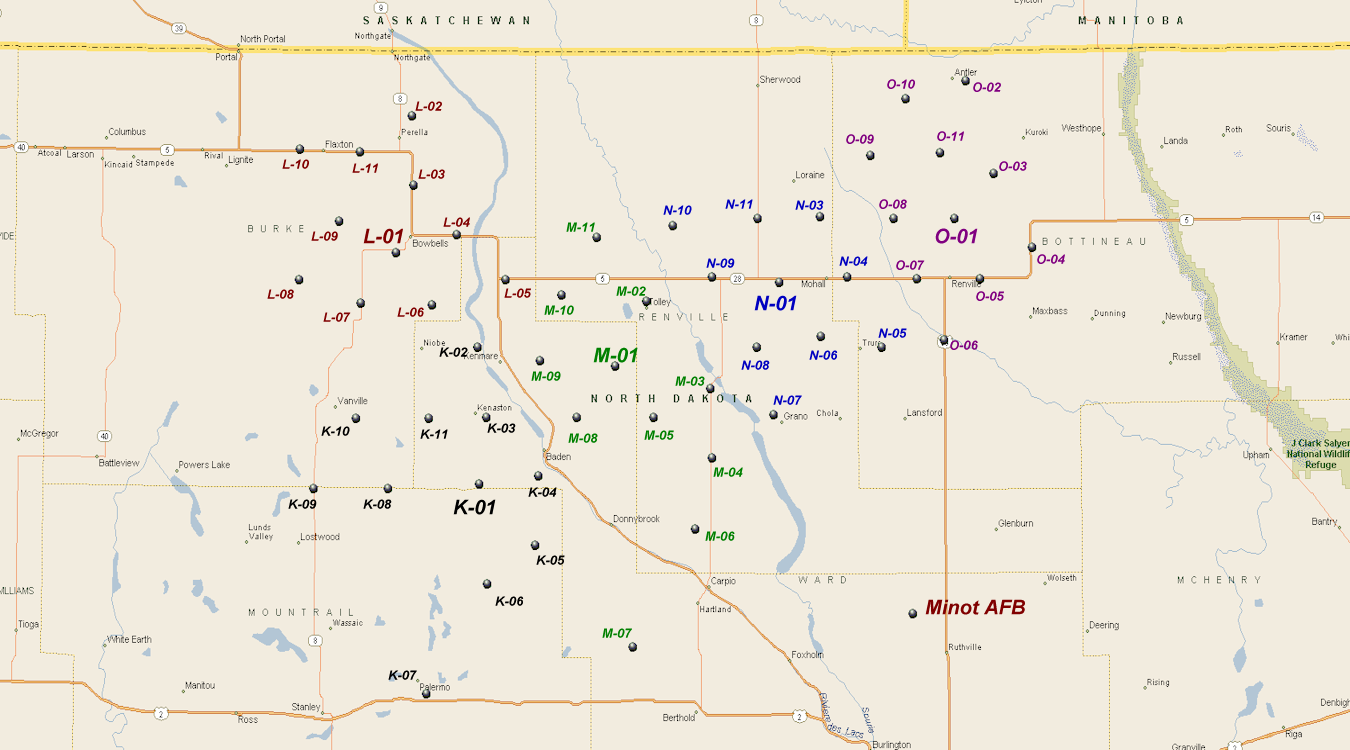
742d Minuteman Missile Alert and Launch Facilities

The squadron was redesignated the 742d Strategic Missile Squadron and activated on 1 January 1963 as an intercontinental ballistic missile squadron at Minot Air Force Base, North Dakota. The squadron was initially equipped with 50 LGM-30B Minuteman Is, and placed its first missile on alert in 1963. The 742d upgraded to the LGM-30G Minuteman III in 1970 to 1971. It has maintained ICBMs on alert ever since.

Squadron missile sites are designated by flight, using one letter of the alphabet, followed by a number. The first site in each flight is #1 and designates the Missile Alert Facility, which consists of an above-ground structure plus an underground launch control center staffed by two officers. The launch facilities, are numbered 2 through 11 and are connected to the launch control center by hardened intersite cables, which also interconnect flights. The 742d includes flights K through O. Squadron missile alert facilities (each controlling 10 missiles) are located as follows:

K-1 8.8 mi SSW of Kenmare, North Dakota: 48°33′02″N 102°07′12″W
L-1 1.5 mi SW of Bowbells, North Dakota: 48°47′21″N 102°16′06″W
M-1 9.1 mi E of Kenmare, North Dakota: 48°40′22″N 101°52′31″W
N-1 3.7 mi W of Mohall, North Dakota: 48°45′34″N 101°35′31″W
O-1 9.5 mi NW of Maxbass, North Dakota: 48°49′28″N 101°16′55″W

The squadron has undergone several changes in assignment that did not affect its mission. In June 1968, the 455th Strategic Missile Wing at Minot was replaced by the 91st Strategic Missile Wing, which moved from Glasgow Air Force Base, Montana to Minot on paper, and the squadron was reassigned to the 91st Wing. In September 1991 Strategic Air Command (SAC) reorganized its combat wings under the combat wing organization, and the 91st Wing's missile squadrons were assigned to the reactivated 91st Operations Group. In 1992, the Air Force reorganized its combat forces. SAC was inactivated and the squadron became an element of Air Combat Command until July 1993, when it became part of Air Force Space Command. Between 1994 and 1996, the wing was reduced to group level. In December 2009, the Air Force's nuclear capable missile units, including the 742d, were transferred to Air Force Global Strike Command.

== Lineage ==
- Constituted as the 742d Bombardment Squadron (Heavy) on 14 May 1943

Activated on 1 June 1943
Redesignated 742d Bombardment Squadron, Heavy on 6 March 1944
Inactivated on 9 September 1945

- Redesignated 742d Bombardment Squadron, Very Heavy on 13 August 1947

Activated in the reserve on 9 September 1947
Inactivated on 27 June 1949

- Redesignated 742d Fighter-Day Squadron on 7 May 1956

Activated on 25 July 1956
Inactivated on 1 July 1957

- Redesignated 742d Strategic Missile Squadron and activated on 18 July 1962 (not organized)

Organized on 1 January 1963
Redesignated as 742d Missile Squadron on 1 September 1991

=== Assignments ===
- 455th Bombardment Group, 1 June 1943 – 9 September 1945
- 455th Bombardment Group, 9 September 1947 – 27 June 1949
- 455th Fighter-Day Group, 25 July 1956 – 1 July 1957
- Strategic Air Command, 18 July 1962 (not organized)
- 455th Strategic Missile Wing, 1 January 1963
- 91st Strategic Missile Wing, 25 June 1968
- 91st Operations Group, 1 September 1991
- 91st Missile Group, 1 July 1994
- 91st Operations Group, 1 February 1996 – present

=== Stations ===
- Alamogordo Army Air Field, New Mexico, 1 June 1943
- Kearns Army Air Base, Utah, 9 September 1943
- Langley Field, Virginia, 5 October – 13 December 1943
- San Giovanni Airfield, Italy, 15 January 1944 – 9 September 1945
- Hensley Field, Texas, 9 September 1947 – 27 June 1949
- Myrtle Beach Air Force Base, South Carolina, 25 July 1956 – 1 July 1957
- Minot Air Force Base, North Dakota, 1 January 1963 – present

=== Aircraft and missiles ===
- Consolidated B-24 Liberator, 1943–1945
- LGM-30B Minuteman I, 1963–1971
- LGM-30G Minuteman III, 1968–present

=== Awards and campaigns ===
Award streamer	Award	Dates	Notes
	Distinguished Unit Citation	2 April 1944	Steyr, Austria, 742d Bombardment Squadron
	Distinguished Unit Citation	26 June 1944	Austria, 742d Bombardment Squadron
	Air Force Outstanding Unit Award	1 July 1972-30 June 1973	742d Strategic Missile Squadron
	Air Force Outstanding Unit Award	1 July 1972-30 June 1973	742d Strategic Missile Squadron
	Air Force Outstanding Unit Award	1 July 1976-30 June 1978	742d Strategic Missile Squadron
	Air Force Outstanding Unit Award	1 July 1978-30 June 1980	742d Strategic Missile Squadron
	Air Force Outstanding Unit Award	1 July 1989-14 February 1991	742d Strategic Missile Squadron
	Air Force Outstanding Unit Award	1 September 1993-31 August 1995	742d Missile Squadron
	Air Force Outstanding Unit Award	1 September 1995-31 August 1997	742d Missile Squadron
	Air Force Outstanding Unit Award	1 October 1998-30 September 2000	742d Missile Squadron
	Air Force Outstanding Unit Award	1 October 2000-1 October 2001	742d Missile Squadron
	Air Force Outstanding Unit Award	1 January-31 December 2002	742d Missile Squadron

Campaign Streamer	Campaign	Dates	Notes
	Air Offensive, Europe	15 January 1944 – 5 June 1944	742d Bombardment Squadron
	Air Combat, EAME Theater	15 January 1944 – 11 May 1945	742d Bombardment Squadron
	Naples-Foggia	15 January 1944 – 21 January 1944	742d Bombardment Squadron
	Anzio	22 January 1944 – 24 May 1944	742d Bombardment Squadron
	Rome-Arno	22 January 1944 – 9 September 1944	742d Bombardment Squadron
	Central Europe	22 March 1944 – 21 May 1945	742d Bombardment Squadron
	Normandy	6 June 1944 – 24 July 1944	742d Bombardment Squadron
	Northern France	25 July 1944 – 14 September 1944	742d Bombardment Squadron
	Southern France	15 August 1944 – 14 September 1944	742d Bombardment Squadron
	North Apennines	10 September 1944 – 4 April 1945	742d Bombardment Squadron
	Rhineland	15 September 1944 – 21 March 1945	742d Bombardment Squadron
	Po Valley	3 April 1945 – 8 May 1945	742d Bombardment Squadron

== See also ==
- List of United States Air Force missile squadrons
- List of United States Air Force fighter squadrons
- B-24 Liberator units of the United States Army Air Forces
