= 743d Bombardment Squadron =

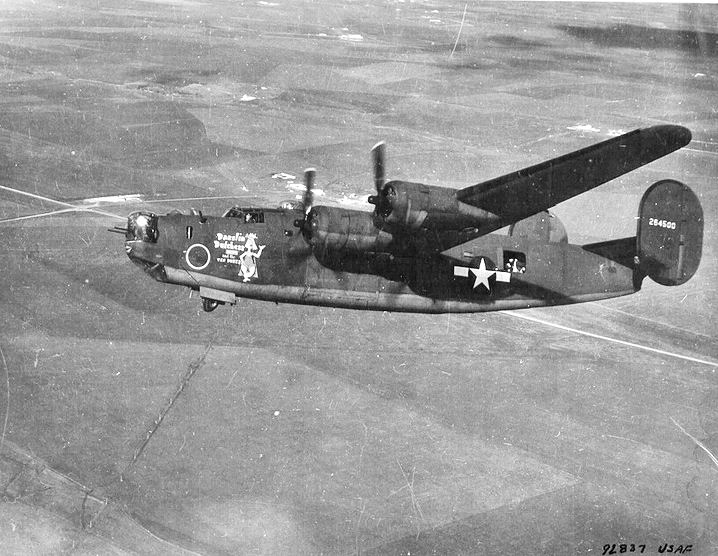
- Dazzlin' Dutchess and the Ten Dukes of the 743d Squadron (Note: Aircraft is Consolidated B-24H-10-CF Liberator, serial 42-64500, Dazzlin' Dutchess and the Ten Dukes. Crashed in Bulgaria on 11 June 1944. Baugher, Joe (10 June 2023). "1942 USAF Serial Numbers". Joe Baugher. Missing Air Crew Report 5771. Picture taken 21 April 1944.)
- Active: 1943–1945; 1947–1949
- Country: United States
- Branch: United States Air Force
- Role: Heavy bomber
- Engagements: Mediterranean Theater of Operations
- Decorations: Distinguished Unit Citation

Insignia
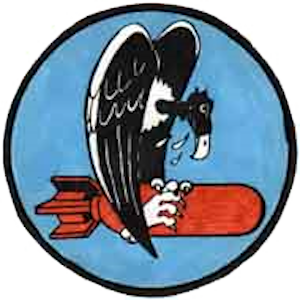
- 743d Bombardment Squadron emblem (World War II) (Note: This emblem was apparently never approved. See Maurer, Combat Squadrons, p. 731 (no approved emblem as of 1963).)

The 743d Bombardment Squadron was first activated in June 1943. After training in the United States with the Consolidated B-24 Liberator bombers, the 743d deployed to the Mediterranean Theater of Operations, participating in the strategic bombing campaign against Germany. It earned two Distinguished Unit Citations for its combat operations. Following V-E Day, it remained in Italy without its flight echelon until inactivating in September 1945

The squadron was activated at Sheppard-Kell Municipal Airport, Texas in the reserve in 1947, but apparently was not fully manned or equipped before inactivating in June 1949, when reserve flying operations at Sheppard ended.

== History ==
=== World War II ===
==== Training in the United States ====
The 743d Bombardment Squadron was first activated at Alamogordo Army Air Field, New Mexico on 1 June 1943, one of the four squadrons of the 455th Bombardment Group. The initial cadre for the squadron was drawn from the 302d Bombardment Group. In July, a group cadre was given advanced tactical training by the Army Air Forces School of Applied Tactics at Orlando Army Air Base and Pinecastle Army Air Field, Florida. After organizing at Alamogordo, the squadron moved to Utah, where the ground echelon was stationed at Kearns Army Air Base, although flying operations were based at Salt Lake City Army Air Base. After completing training at Langley Field, Virginia, the squadron departed the United States for the Mediterranean Theater of Operations in December 1943. The air echelon began staging through Mitchel Field, New York to ferry their Liberators via the southern ferry route. The ground echelon sailed on the SS Charles Brantley Aycock.

==== Combat operations ====
The air echelon of the squadron was delayed in Tunisia and was not entirely lodged at the squadron's combat station of San Giovanni Airfield, Italy until 1 February 1944, and the squadron flew its first mission later that month. The squadron was engaged primarily in the strategic bombing campaign against Germany, attacking targets like airfields, factories, oil refineries, harbors, marshalling yards in Italy, France, Germany, Austria, Hungary, Romania, and Yugoslavia.

On 2 April 1944, the squadron attacked a ball bearing plant at Steyr, Austria for which it earned a Distinguished Unit Citation (DUC). The primary target, the Daimler-Pusch aircraft engine factory was obscured by clouds, so the unit attacked the nearby ball bearing plant although attacks by an estimated 75 twin engine fighters continued through the bomb run and heavy, accurate flak was encountered. The squadron claimed the destruction of nine of these fighters against the loss of two squadron Liberators.

On 26 June 1944, the squadron encountered fighter opposition that was described as the strongest Fifteenth Air Force had encountered to date, and which destroyed several Liberators of the 455th Group, which was leading the 304th Bombardment Wing on the raid. The squadron pressed its attack on the oil refinery at Moosbierbaum, Austria, for which it received a second DUC. The squadron put nine bombers over the target, but was the only squadron of the group to bring all its planes home.

The squadron provided air support to ground forces in Operation Shingle, the landings at Anzio, and the Battle of Monte Cassino in the spring of 1944. It knocked out coastal defenses to clear the way for Operation Dragoon, the invasion of southern France, in September. As Axis forces were withdrawing from the Balkan peninsula in the fall of 1944, the squadron bombed marshalling yards, troop concentrations and airfields to slow their retreat. It flew air interdiction missions to support Operation Grapeshot, the Spring 1945 offensive in Northern Italy.

The squadron flew its last combat mission on 25 April 1945 against rail yards at Linz, Austria. Following the surrender of German forces in Italy, it flew some supply missions and transported personnel to ports and airfields for shipment back to the United States. Most of the air echelon returned to the United States, ferrying their aircraft in June. Many of the squadron's remaining personnel were transferred to other units in the 304th Bombardment Wing for shipment back to the United States, while the squadron remained in Italy, serving as a replacement depot. The last of the air echelon departed Italy in July and the squadron was inactivated on 9 September 1945.

=== Air Force reserve ===
The squadron was reactivated as a reserve unit under Air Defense Command (ADC) at Sheppard-Kell Municipal Airport, Texas in October 1947, although its parent 455th Group was located at Hensley Field, Texas. It was nominally a very heavy bomber unit, but the squadron does not appear to have been fully manned or equipped with tactical aircraft while a reserve unit. In 1948 Continental Air Command assumed responsibility for managing reserve and Air National Guard units from ADC. President Truman's reduced 1949 defense budget required reductions in the number of units in the Air Force. As a result, the squadron was inactivated and reserve flying operations at Sheppard came to an end.

== Lineage ==
- Constituted as the 743d Bombardment Squadron (Heavy) on 14 May 1943

Activated on 1 June 1943
Redesignated 743d Bombardment Squadron, Heavy on 6 March 1944
Inactivated on 9 September 1945

- Redesignated 743d Bombardment Squadron, Very Heavy on 23 September 1947

Activated in the reserve on 15 October 1947
Inactivated on 27 June 1949

=== Assignments ===
- 455th Bombardment Group, 1 Jun 1943 – September 1945
- 455th Bombardment Group, 15 October 1947 – 27 June 1949

=== Stations ===
- Alamogordo Army Air Field, New Mexico, 1 June 1943
- Kearns Army Air Base, Utah, 9 September 1943
- Langley Field, Virginia, 5 October–13 December 1943
- San Giovanni Airfield, Italy, 15 Jan 1944 – 9 September 1945
- Sheppard-Kell Municipal Airport (later Sheppard Air Force Base), Texas, 15 October 1947 – 27 June 1949

=== Aircraft ===
- Consolidated B-24 Liberator, 1943-1945

=== Awards and campaigns ===
Award streamer	Award	Dates	Notes
	Distinguished Unit Citation	2 April 1944	Steyr, Austria
	Distinguished Unit Citation	26 June 1944	Austria

Campaign Streamer	Campaign	Dates	Notes
	Air Offensive, Europe	15 January 1944 – 5 June 1944	
	Air Combat, EAME Theater	15 January 1944 – 11 May 1945	
	Naples-Foggia	15 January 1944 – 21 January 1944	
	Anzio	22 January 1944 – 24 May 1944	
	Rome-Arno	22 January 1944 – 9 September 1944	
	Central Europe	22 March 1944 – 21 May 1945	
	Normandy	6 June 1944 – 24 July 1944	
	Northern France	25 July 1944 – 14 September 1944	
	Southern France	15 August 1944 – 14 September 1944	
	North Apennines	10 September 1944 – 4 April 1945	
	Rhineland	15 September 1944 – 21 March 1945	
	Po Valley	3 April 1945 – 8 May 1945	

== See also ==
- B-24 Liberator units of the United States Army Air Forces
