= 455th Air Expeditionary Wing =

455th Air Expeditionary Wing

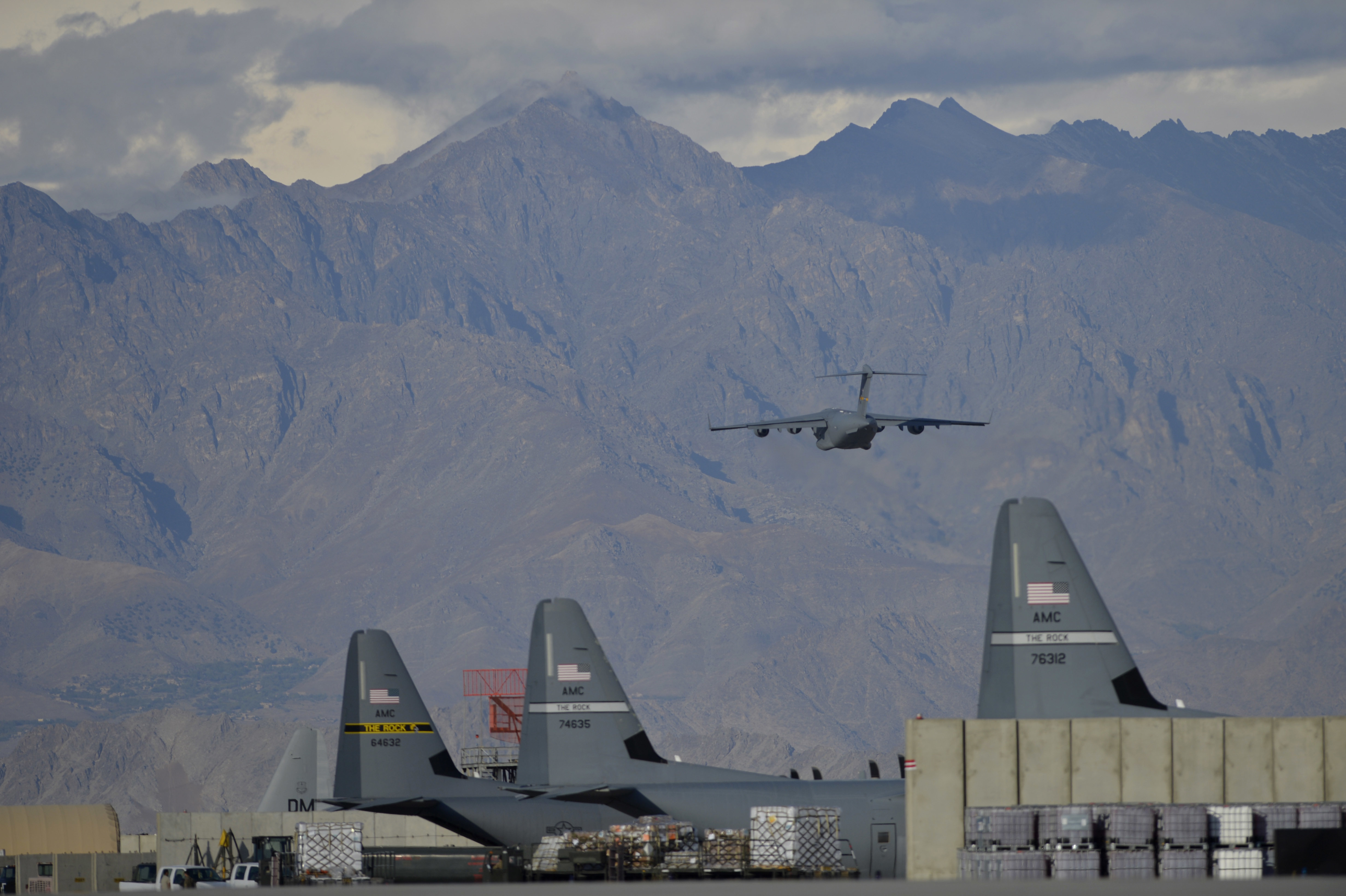
- A C-17 Globemaster III takes off from Bagram Airfield near C-130 Hercules deployed with the wing
- Active: 1943–1945; 1947–1949; 1956–1957; 1962–1968; 2002–2021
- Country: United States
- Branch: United States Air Force
- Type: Air Expeditionary
- Role: Combat & Combat Support
- Part of: United States Air Forces Central Command
- Nickname: Vulgar Vultures (World War II)
- Engagements: Mediterranean Theater of Operations
- Decorations: Distinguished Unit Citation; Air Force Meritorious Unit Award; Air Force Outstanding Unit Award with Combat "V" Device

Commanders
- Notable commanders: Steven L. Kwast

Insignia
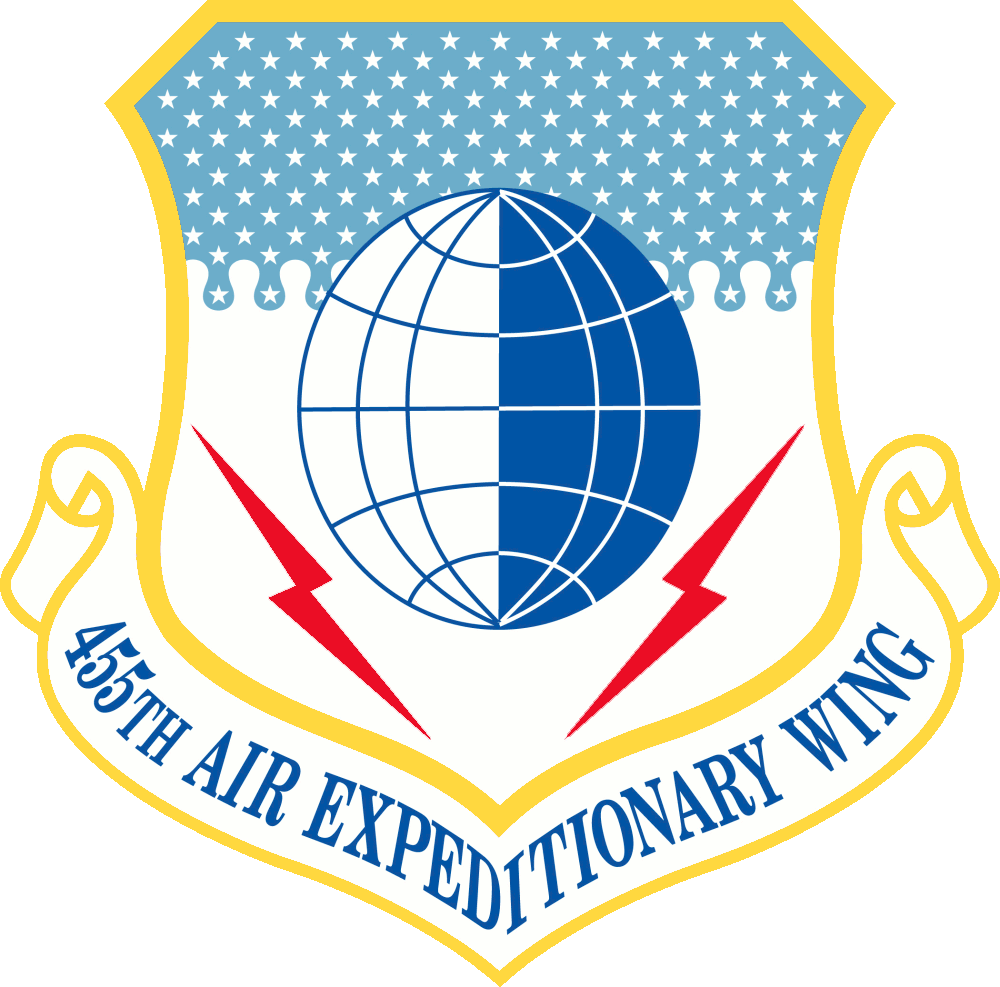
- 455th Air Expeditionary Wing emblem (Note: Approved 3 August 2017.)

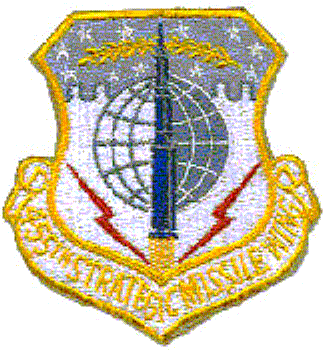
- Patch with 455th Strategic Missile Wing emblem (Note: Approved c. October 1963.)

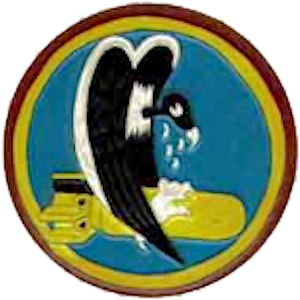
- Unofficial 455th Bombardment Group emblem (Note: Maurer indicates the group had no official emblem, Maurer, Combat Units, p. 330. The "Vulgar Vulture" was used by each squadron in the group with the bomb rendered in the squadron color. Watkins, pp. 100–01.)

The 455th Air Expeditionary Wing was a provisional United States Air Force unit located at Bagram Airfield, Afghanistan, from 2002 to 2021. It was one of two expeditionary wings in Afghanistan. Most wing personnel were located at the Air Force Village known as Camp Cunningham.

The first predecessor of the wing was organized in 1943 as the 455th Bombardment Group. After training in the United States with Consolidated B-24 Liberator bombers, the 455th deployed to the Mediterranean Theater of Operations, participating in the strategic bombing campaign against Germany. It earned two Distinguished Unit Citations for its combat operations. Following V-E Day, it remained in Italy without its flight echelon until inactivating in September 1945.

The group was activated in the reserve in 1947. Apparently, it was not fully manned or equipped before inactivating in June 1949 and transferring most of its resources to another unit. It was redesignated the 445th Fighter-Day Group and activated in 1956, but did not become operational before inactivating in July 1957.

The wing's second predecessor was established in 1953, but not organized until November 1962 as the 455th Strategic Missile Wing an LGM-30B Minuteman I wing. It was inactivated in June 1968 and transferred its assets to the 91st Strategic Missile Wing. The group and wing were consolidated in 1985. In 2001, the consolidated unit was converted to provisional status as the 455th Air Expeditionary Group. It was activated the following year.

== Mission ==
The wing's mission was to provide fighter, rescue, transport, and other air force activities as part of U.S. operations during the War in Afghanistan (2001-2021). Activated in 2002, the 455th had members deployed throughout the country supporting Operation Enduring Freedom.

The wing commander reported to the United States Air Forces Central Command commander in Southwest Asia. The commander was supported by a wing staff and oversaw five Air Force groups located at Bagram and one at Kandahar Airfield. The five groups were the 455th Expeditionary Operations Group, the 455th Expeditionary Maintenance Group, the 455th Expeditionary Mission Support Group, 455th Expeditionary Medical Group, and the 455th Expeditionary Base Defense Group. It also oversaw the 451st Air Expeditionary Group at Kandahar Airfield.

== History ==
=== World War II ===
==== Training in the United States ====
The group was first activated at Alamogordo Army Air Field, New Mexico on 1 June 1943 as the 445th Bombardment Group, with the 740th, 741st, 742d and 743d Bombardment Squadrons assigned. The initial cadre for the group was drawn from the 302d Bombardment Group. In July, a cadre was given advanced tactical training by the Army Air Forces School of Applied Tactics at Orlando Army Air Base and Pinecastle Army Air Field, Florida. After organizing at Alamogordo, the group moved to Utah, where the ground echelon was stationed at Kearns Army Air Base, although flying operations were based at Salt Lake City Army Air Base. After completing training at Langley Field, Virginia, the group departed the United States for the Mediterranean Theater of Operations in December 1943. The air echelon began staging through Mitchel Field, New York to ferry their Liberators via the southern ferry route. The ground echelon of group headquarters sailed on the SS William T. Barry.

==== Combat operations ====
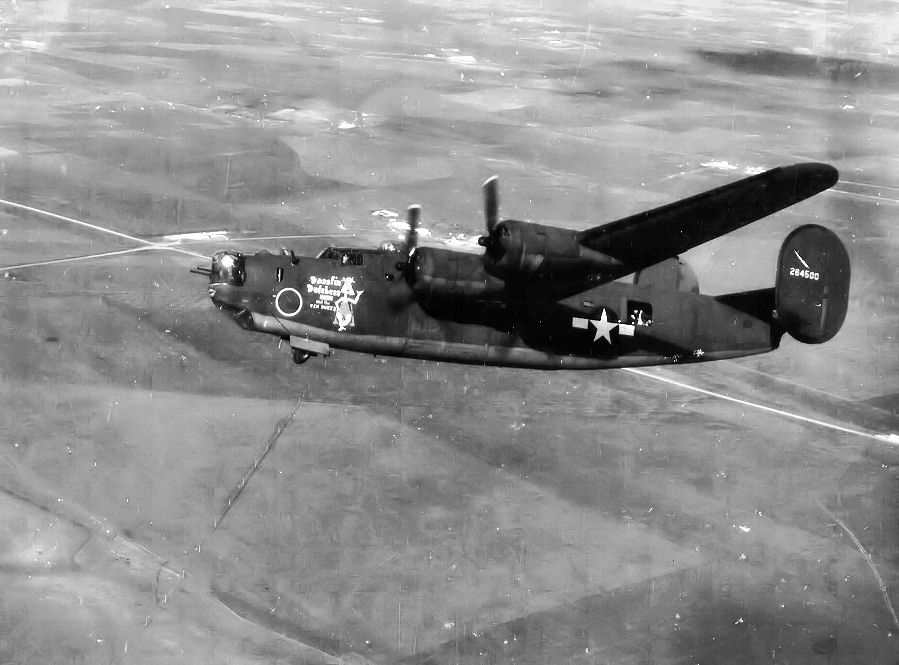
Consolidated B-24H-10-CF Liberator 42-64500, 743d Bomb Squadron. Lost on 11 June 1944

The air echelon of the group was delayed in Tunisia and was not entirely lodged at the 455th's combat station of San Giovanni Airfield, Italy until 1 February 1944, and the group flew its first mission on 16 February. The group was engaged primarily in the strategic bombing campaign against Germany, attacking targets like airfields, factories, oil refineries, harbors, marshalling yards in Italy, France, Germany, Austria, Hungary, Romania, and Yugoslavia.

On 2 April 1944, the group attacked a ball-bearing plant at Steyr, Austria for which it earned a Distinguished Unit Citation (DUC). The primary target, the Daimler-Pusch aircraft engine factory was obscured by clouds, so the unit attacked the nearby ball bearing plant although attacks by an estimated 75 twin-engine fighters continued through the bomb run and heavy, accurate flak was encountered. The 740th claimed the destruction of seven of these fighters against the loss of one squadron Liberator. The 742d lost two Liberators in the attack but claimed the destruction of six enemy aircraft. Five crewmembers from one of the squadron's B-24s lost in the attack bailed out in territory controlled by Yugoslav Partisans and were able to evade German forces and returned to the squadron a month after the attack. The 743d Squadron claimed the destruction of nine fighters against the loss of two squadron Liberators. (Note: The 741st Squadron did not to suffer any losses in this operation. This was at least in part because the squadron only put two Liberators over the target on the mission, while the other squadrons averaged ten. Asch, et al., pp. 61–69.)

On 26 June 1944, the group, which was leading the 304th Bombardment Wing on the raid, encountered fighter opposition that was described as the strongest Fifteenth Air Force had encountered to date, and which destroyed several Liberators of the 455th Group. One 740th Liberator was lost on the raid, while the squadron claimed eleven enemy aircraft destroyed (two shared claims). Enemy fighters were able to separate the 741st Squadron from its fighter escort and intensified their attacks on the squadron. One 741st bomber was lost when a Luftwaffe fighter dove head-on into it. The Liberator continued on the bomb run and dropped its bombs on the target before crashing into the ground (Note: The group report expressly mentions the crew of this plane continuing the attack. While the squadron history and DUC citation both mention the collision, neither discusses the continuation of the attack. Compare Asch, et al., p. 82 (group report) with p. 83 (squadron history) and p. 85 (DUC citation).) Other fighters continued their attacks to within 100 feet of the group's planes. On this mission, the 742d Squadron suffered its heaviest losses of the war, with six planes lost to enemy action. Only one of the squadron's Liberators that reached the target returned safely. The 743d Squadron put nine bombers over the target but was the only squadron of the group to bring all its planes home. The group pressed its attack on an oil refinery at Moosbierbaum, Austria, for which it received a second DUC.

The group provided air support to ground forces in Operation Shingle, the landings at Anzio and the Battle of Monte Cassino in the spring of 1944. It knocked out coastal defenses to clear the way for Operation Dragoon, the invasion of southern France in September. As Axis forces were withdrawing from the Balkan peninsula in the fall of 1944, the squadron bombed marshalling yards, troop concentrations and airfields to slow their retreat. It flew air interdiction missions to support Operation Grapeshot, the Spring 1945 offensive in Northern Italy.

The group flew its last combat mission on 25 April 1945 against rail yards at Linz, Austria. Following the surrender of German forces in Italy, it flew some supply missions and transported personnel to ports and airfields for shipment back to the United States. Most of the air echelon returned to the United States, ferrying their aircraft in June. The 740th Squadron's ground personnel moved to Bari Airfield in July 1945, where they serviced the aircraft assigned to headquarters, Fifteenth Air Force. Many of the group's remaining personnel were transferred to other units in the 304th Bombardment Wing for shipment back to the United States, while the group remained in Italy, serving as a replacement depot. The last of the air echelon departed Italy in July and the group was inactivated on 9 September 1945.

The group lost 118 aircraft. It suffered 147 killed in action, 268 Missing in action, 179 prisoners of war, and 169 wounded in action. On the other hand, the group claimed the destruction of 119 enemy aircraft.

=== Air Force reserve ===
The group was reactivated as a reserve unit under Air Defense Command (ADC) in March 1947 at Hensley Field, Texas, with the 740th Squadron, which was already active, assigned to it. At Hensley its training was supervised by ADC's 4122d AAF Base Unit (later the 2596th Air Force Reserve Training Center). The 741st and 742d Squadrons were activated to join the group in late June and early September 1947, respectively. In October, the group was rounded out with the activation of the 743d Squadron, which was not stationed with the group, but at Sheppard-Kell Municipal Airport. The 455th was nominally a very heavy bomber unit, but does not appear to have been fully manned or equipped while a reserve unit. In 1948 Continental Air Command (ConAC) assumed responsibility for managing reserve and Air National Guard units from ADC. President Truman's reduced 1949 defense budget required reductions in the number of units in the Air Force. ConAC also reorganized its reserve units under the wing base organization system in June 1949. As a result, the group was inactivated and its personnel and equipment at Hensley Field were transferred to elements of the 443d Troop Carrier Wing, which was activated simultaneously. The 743d Squadron was also inactivated and reserve flying operations at Sheppard came to an end.

=== Tactical Air Command ===
The group was redesignated the 455th Fighter-Day Group and activated at Myrtle Beach Air Force Base, South Carolina in July 1956 as Tactical Air Command planned to organize a second North American F-100 Super Sabre wing there. (Note: Although the 455th Wing had been established in 1953, it was never activated at Myrtle Beach. Ravenstein, p. 250.) Some personnel were assigned to the group and its squadrons, but it never became operational with aircraft. It was inactivated in July 1957 and its few personnel were reassigned to elements of the 354th Fighter-Day Wing.

=== Intercontinental ballistic missile wing ===
The wing's second predecessor was organized at Minot Air Force Base, North Dakota in November 1962 as the 455th Strategic Missile Wing along with its 740th Squadron. The 741st and 742d Squadrons were organized in December 1962 and January 1963. The wing prepared for operational capability with LGM-30B Minuteman I missiles through March 1964. The wing's first Minuteman missile arrived on 6 September 1963, and was placed three days later. The 150th, and final, missile was placed on 26 February 1964, and by late March the wing became combat-ready.

On 25 June 1968, the 455th was inactivated and transferred its assets to the 91st Strategic Missile Wing, which moved to Minot on paper from Glasgow Air Force Base, Montana. The three missile squadrons, however, were reassigned to the 91st Wing.

On 31 January 1984, the 455th Fighter-Day Group and the 455th Strategic Missile Wing were consolidated into a single unit under the wing's designation.

=== War in Afghanistan ===
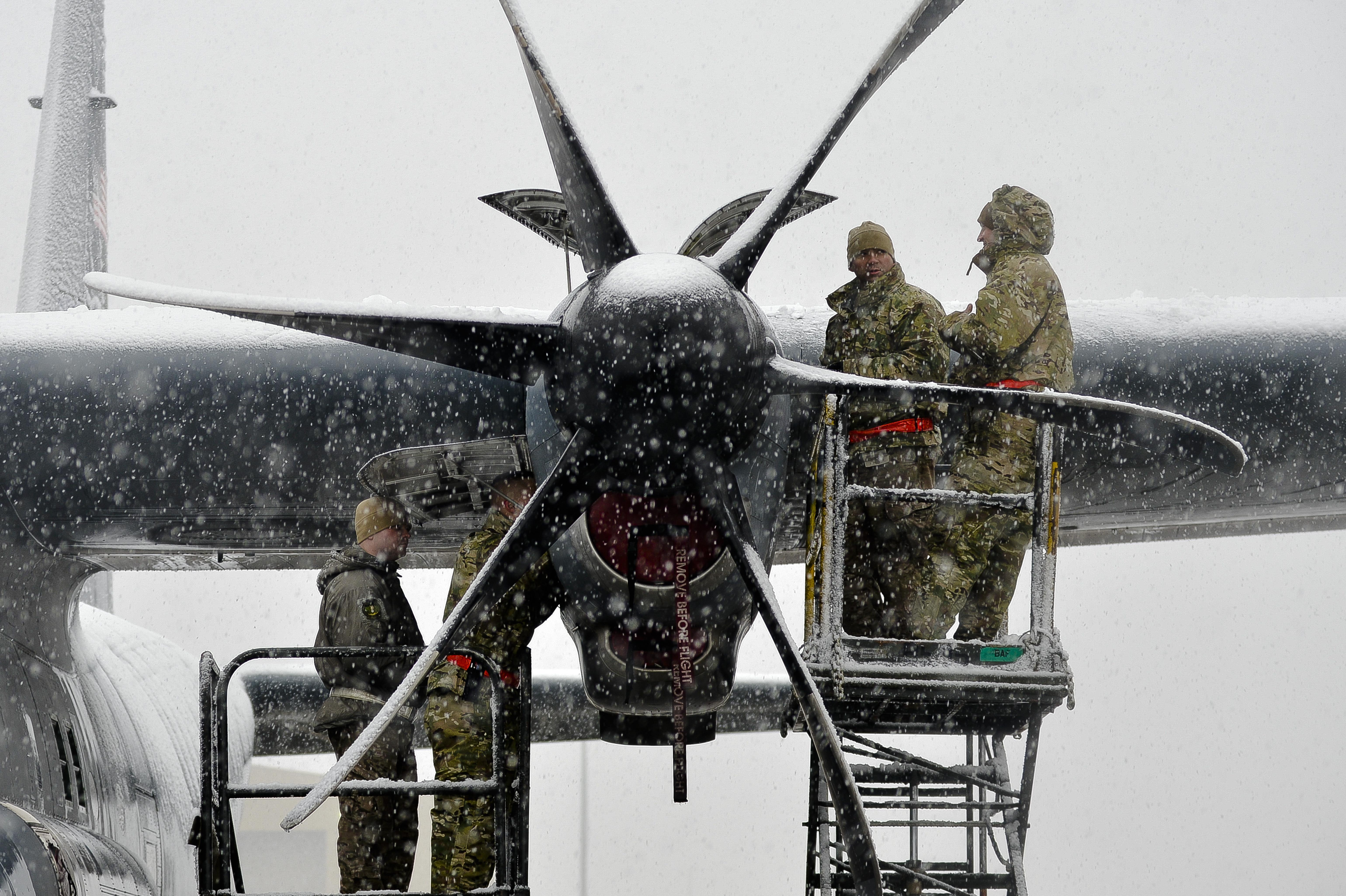
Maintenance squadron working on the engine of a C-130J Super Hercules, Bagram Air Base

The 455th was converted to provisional status in December 2001 and redesignated the 455th Air Expeditionary Group after the United States invasion of Afghanistan. It was activated on 26 April 2002 at Bagram Air Base. In July 2002, the group was redesignated the 455th Air Expeditionary Wing with five assigned groups. Since then the wing provided close air support, air mobility, intelligence, surveillance, reconnaissance, combat search and rescue, electronic attack, aero medical evacuation, and combat support as the lead Air Force organization in Afghanistan. The wing consisted of about 1,600 airmen, based throughout Afghanistan.

The 455 AEW was awarded the Meritorious Unit Award for all personnel assigned between 1 October 2006 and 30 September 2007, 1 October 2008 through 30 September 2009, and 1 October 2010 through 30 September 2011.

In 2018 the 83rd Expeditionary Rescue Squadron became a joint Army-Air Force unit. The squadron, which has been strictly U.S. Air Force personnel flying the HH-60, was to become a joint unit containing Air Force pararescuemen and combat rescue officers and U.S. Army CH-47 Chinooks helicopters and pilots.

The last commander for the wing served up until mid-2021.

==== Units in the 2010s ====
The wing consisted of five groups:

455th Expeditionary Operations Group. The group is responsible for all expeditionary flying and aeromedical evacuation operations for the wing. It oversees operations of a General Dynamics F-16 Fighting Falcon close air support squadron, a Lockheed C-130 Hercules airlift squadron, a Sikorsky HH-60 Pave Hawk/Guardian Angel rescue squadron, a Lockheed EC-130H Compass Call electronic combat squadron and an aeromedical evacuation flight. It also oversees support functions such as air traffic control, intelligence, weather, radar monitoring and landing systems, airfield management and command and control equipment at forward-operating bases.

83d Expeditionary Rescue Squadron (Boeing CH-47 Chinook)
774th Expeditionary Airlift Squadron (Lockheed C-130 Hercules)
41st Expeditionary Electronic Combat Squadron (Lockheed EC-130H Compass Call)
Rotational Expeditionary Fighter Squadron (General Dynamics F-16 Fighting Falcon)
555th Expeditionary Fighter Squadron April–October 2015
421st Expeditionary Fighter Squadron October 2015 – April 2016.

457th Expeditionary Fighter Squadron April–October 2016.
93d Expeditionary Fighter Squadron April–October 2016.
79th Expeditionary Fighter Squadron October 2016 – April 2017.
555th Expeditionary Fighter Squadron April–October 2017
77th Expeditionary Fighter Squadron October 2017 – April 2018

455th Expeditionary Mission Support Group. The group provides services in support of coalition forces throughout Afghanistan. It is composed of five squadrons responsible for communications, civil engineer operations, force support, logistics readiness, and security forces.

455th Expeditionary Aerial Port Squadron
455th Expeditionary Civil Engineer Squadron
455th Expeditionary Communications Squadron
455th Expeditionary Force Support Squadron
455th Expeditionary Logistics Readiness Squadron
455th Expeditionary Security Forces Squadron

455th Expeditionary Maintenance Group. The group provided combat-ready aircraft and munitions in support of coalition forces throughout Afghanistan. The group comprises two squadrons responsible for on- and off-aircraft maintenance and sortie generation of F-15E, F-16 and C-130 aircraft, as well as launch, recovery, and servicing support for military and commercial transient aircraft.

455th Expeditionary Maintenance Squadron
455th Expeditionary Aircraft Maintenance Squadron

455th Expeditionary Medical Group. The group was the Air Force component for Task Force Med, which provides combat medical and combat medical support services to U.S. and coalition forces throughout Afghanistan. Along with the U.S. Army, the group staffed Craig Joint Theater Hospital at Bagram.

455th Expeditionary Medical Operations Squadron
455th Expeditionary Medical Support Squadron

451st Air Expeditionary Group: The group operated the Northrop Grumman E-11, General Atomics MQ-1 Predator, and General Atomics MQ-9 Reaper at Kandahar and Jalalabad Airfields.

== Lineage ==
455th Fighter-Day Group

- Constituted as the 455th Bombardment Group (Heavy) on 14 May 1943

Activated on 1 June 1943
Redesignated 455th Bombardment Group, Heavy on 6 March 1944
Inactivated on 9 September 1945

- Redesignated 455th Bombardment Group, Very Heavy on 5 March 1947

Activated on 25 March 1947
Inactivated on 27 June 1949
Redesignated 455th Fighter-Day Group on 7 May 1956
Activated on 25 July 1956
Inactivated 1 July 1957

- Consolidated with the 455th Strategic Missile Wing as the 455th Strategic Missile Wing on 31 January 1984

455th Air Expeditionary Wing

- Established as the 455th Fighter-Bomber Wing on 23 March 1953
- Redesignated 455th Strategic Missile Wing (ICBM—Minuteman) and activated on 28 June 1962 (not organized)

Organized on 1 November 1962
Discontinued and inactivated on 25 June 1968

- Consolidated with the 455th Fighter-Day Group on 31 January 1984
- Converted to provisional status and redesignated 455th Air Expeditionary Group on 4 December 2001 and assigned to Air Combat Command to activate or inactivate as needed
- Activated on 26 April 2002
- Redesignated 455th Air Expeditionary Wing on 26 July 2002

Last change of command reported mid-2018.

=== Assignments ===
- II Bomber Command, 1 June 1943
- I Bomber Command, 4 October 1943
- Fifteenth Air Force, c. 15 January 1944
- 304th Bombardment Wing, 25 January 1944 – 9 September 1945
- Tenth Air Force, 25 March 1947
- 309th Bombardment Wing (later 309th Air Division), 17 October 1947 – 27 June 1949
- Ninth Air Force, 25 July 1956 – 1 July 1957 (attached to 342d Fighter-Day Wing until 19 November 1956, then to 354th Fighter-Day Wing)
- Strategic Air Command, 28 June 1962 (not organized)
- 810th Strategic Aerospace Division, 1 November 1962 – 25 June 1968
- Air Combat Command to activate or inactivate as needed, 4 December 2001

9th Aerospace Expeditionary Task Force, 26 July 2002 – c.2017 f

=== Stations ===
- Alamogordo Army Air Field, New Mexico, 1 June 1943
- Kearns Army Air Field, Utah, c. 6 September 1943
- Langley Field, Virginia, c. 5 October – 2 December 1943
- San Giovanni Airfield, Italy, 15 January 1944 – 9 September 1945
- Hensley Field, Texas, 25 March 1947 – 27 June 1949
- Myrtle Beach Air Force Base, South Carolina, 25 July 1956 – 1 July 1957
- Minot Air Force Base, North Dakota, 1 November 1962 – 25 June 1968
- Bagram Airfield, Afghanistan, 26 April 2002 – Jul 2021

=== Components ===
Groups

- 451st Air Expeditionary Group, 1 April 2014 – present
- 455th Expeditionary Operations Group, 26 July 2002 – present
- 455th Expeditionary Logistics Group (later 455th Expeditionary Maintenance Group), c. 26 July 2002 – present
- 455th Expeditionary Medical Group, c. 26 July 2002 – present
- 455th Expeditionary Support Group (later 455th Expeditionary Mission Support Group), c. 26 July 2002 – present
- 755th Expeditionary Mission Support Group (later 755th Air Expeditionary Group), 17 January 2006 – present

Squadrons

- 740th Bombardment Squadron (later 740th Fighter-Day Squadron, 740th Strategic Missile Squadron): 1 June 1943 – 9 September 1945, 25 March 1947 – 27 June 1949, 25 July 1956 – 1 July 1957, 1 December 1962 – 25 June 1968
- 741st Bombardment Squadron (later 741st Fighter-Day Squadron, 741st Strategic Missile Squadron): 1 June 1943 – 9 September 1945, 26 June 1947 – 27 June 1949, 25 July 1956 – 1 July 1957, 1 December 1962 – 25 June 1968
- 742d Bombardment Squadron (later 742d Fighter-Day Squadron, 743d Strategic Missile Squadron): 1 June 1943 – 9 September 1945, 9 September 1947 – 27 June 1949, 25 July 1956 – 1 July 1957, 1 January 1963 – 25 June 1968
- 743d Bombardment Squadron: 1 June 1943 – 9 September 1945, 15 October 1947 – 27 June 1949

=== Aircraft and missiles ===
- Consolidated B-24 Liberator, 1943–1945
- Boeing LGM-30B Minuteman I (1962–1968)
- Fairchild Republic A-10 Thunderbolt II (2002–2020)
- Grumman EA-6B Prowler (since 2003)
- Lockheed EC-130H Compass Call (since 2003)
- McDonnell Douglas F-15E Strike Eagle (since 2007)
- General Dynamics F-16 Fighting Falcon (2009-2021)
- Sikorsky HH-60 Pave Hawk (since 2003)
- Lockheed C-130J Hercules (since 2008)
- Lockheed C-130H Hercules (since 2003)
- General Atomics MQ-1 Predator (since 2003)
- Beechcraft MC-12W Huron (since 2009)
- Northrop Grumman E-11 (since 2014)
- General Atomics MQ-9 Reaper (since 2014)

== Awards and campaigns ==
Award streamer	Award	Dates	Notes
	Distinguished Unit Citation	2 April 1944	455th Bombardment Group, Steyr, Austria
	Distinguished Unit Citation	26 June 1944	455th Bombardment Group, Austria
	Air Force Outstanding Unit Award with Combat "V" Device	16 April 2002–15 September 2002	455th Air Expeditionary Wing
	Air Force Outstanding Unit Award with Combat "V" Device	16 September 2002–15 September 2003	455th Air Expeditionary Wing
	Air Force Outstanding Unit Award with Combat "V" Device	16 September 2003–30 September 2004	455th Air Expeditionary Wing
	Air Force Meritorious Unit Award	1 October 2004–30 September 2005	455th Air Expeditionary Wing
	Air Force Meritorious Unit Award	1 October 2005–30 September 2006	455th Air Expeditionary Wing
	Air Force Meritorious Unit Award	1 October 2006–30 September 2007	455th Air Expeditionary Wing
	Air Force Meritorious Unit Award	1 October 2007–30 September 2008	455th Air Expeditionary Wing
	Air Force Meritorious Unit Award	1 October 2008–30 September 2009	455th Air Expeditionary Wing
	Air Force Meritorious Unit Award	1 October 2009–30 September 2010	455th Air Expeditionary Wing
	Air Force Meritorious Unit Award	1 October 2010–30 September 2011	455th Air Expeditionary Wing
	Air Force Meritorious Unit Award	1 October 2011–30 September 2012	455th Air Expeditionary Wing
	Air Force Meritorious Unit Award	1 July 2012–30 June 2013	455th Air Expeditionary Wing
	Air Force Meritorious Unit Award	1 July 2013–30 June 2014	455th Air Expeditionary Wing
	Air Force Meritorious Unit Award	1 October 2015–31 March 2017	455th Air Expeditionary Wing

Campaign Streamer	Campaign	Dates	Notes
	Air Offensive, Europe	15 January 1944 – 5 June 1944	455th Bombardment Group
	Air Combat, EAME Theater	15 January 1944 – 11 May 1945	455th Bombardment Group
	Naples-Foggia	15 January 1944 – 21 January 1944	455th Bombardment Group
	Anzio	22 January 1944 – 24 May 1944	455th Bombardment Group
	Rome-Arno	22 January 1944 – 9 September 1944	455th Bombardment Group
	Central Europe	22 March 1944 – 21 May 1945	455th Bombardment Group
	Normandy	6 June 1944 – 24 July 1944	455th Bombardment Group
	Northern France	25 July 1944 – 14 September 1944	455th Bombardment Group
	Southern France	15 August 1944 – 14 September 1944	455th Bombardment Group
	North Apennines	10 September 1944 – 4 April 1945	455th Bombardment Group
	Rhineland	15 September 1944 – 21 March 1945	455th Bombardment Group
	Po Valley	3 April 1945 – 8 May 1945	455th Bombardment Group
	Consolidation I	26 April 2002 – 30 September 2006	455th Air Expeditionary Group (later 455th Air Expeditionary Wing)
	Consolidation II	1 November 2006 – 30 November 2006	455th Air Expeditionary Wing
	Consolidation III	1 December 2006 – 30 June 2011	455th Air Expeditionary Wing

== See also ==
- List of missile wings of the United States Air Force
- B-24 Liberator units of the United States Army Air Forces
- Liberator airplane crash near Sveta Trojica
