= 91st Operations Group =

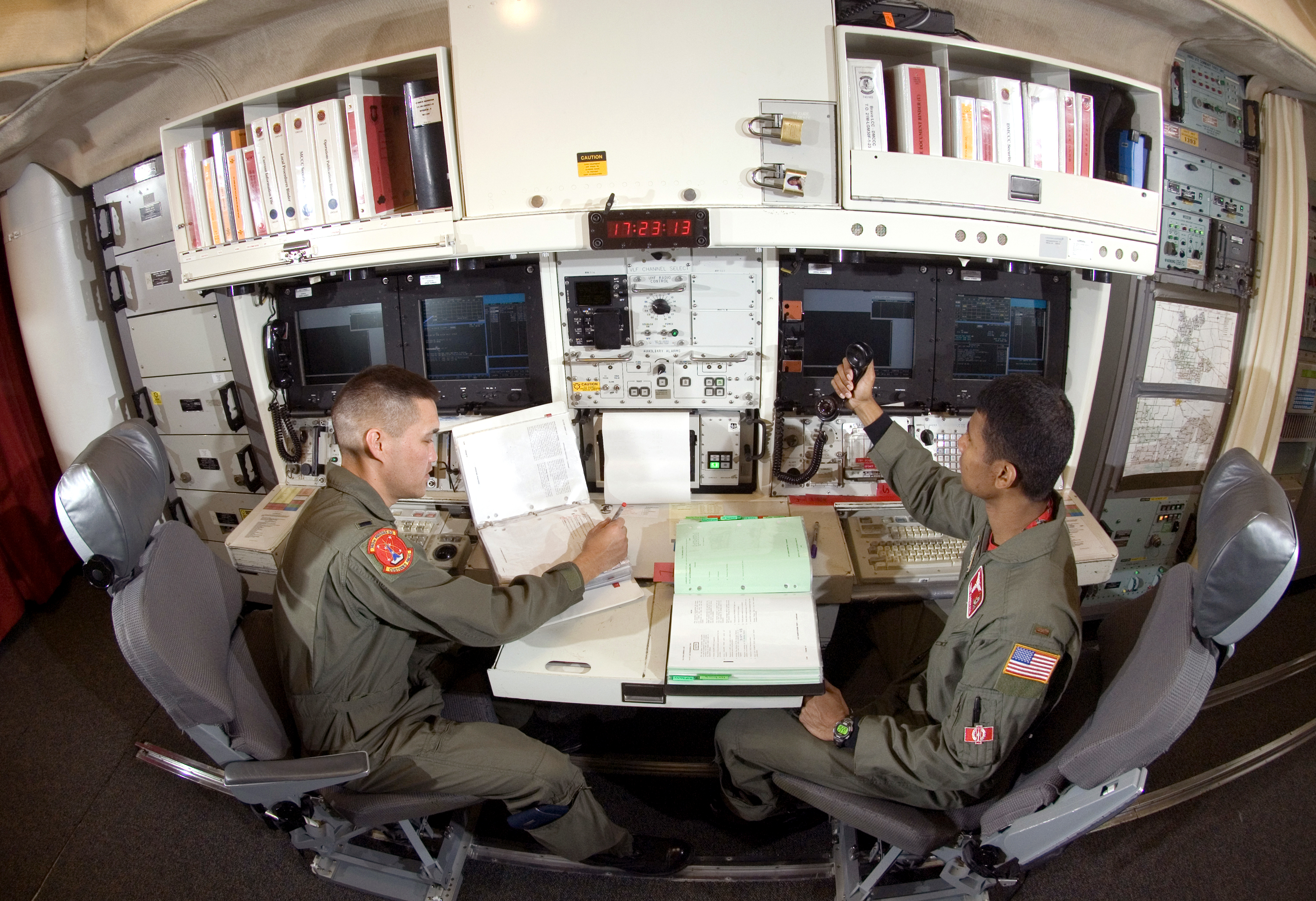
- Group Minuteman missile crew on alert
- Active: 1942—1945; 1947–1952; 1991–1994; 1996–present
- Country: United States
- Branch: United States Air Force
- Role: Intercontinental ballistic missile
- Part of: Global Strike Command
- Garrison/HQ: Minot Air Force Base, ND
- Nickname: The Ragged Irregulars (World War II) (Note: This was originally "Wray's Ragged Irregulars", after the group's first commander, Col. Stanley T. Wray.)
- Engagements: European Theater of Operations
- Decorations: Distinguished Unit Citation; Air Force Outstanding Unit Award

Insignia
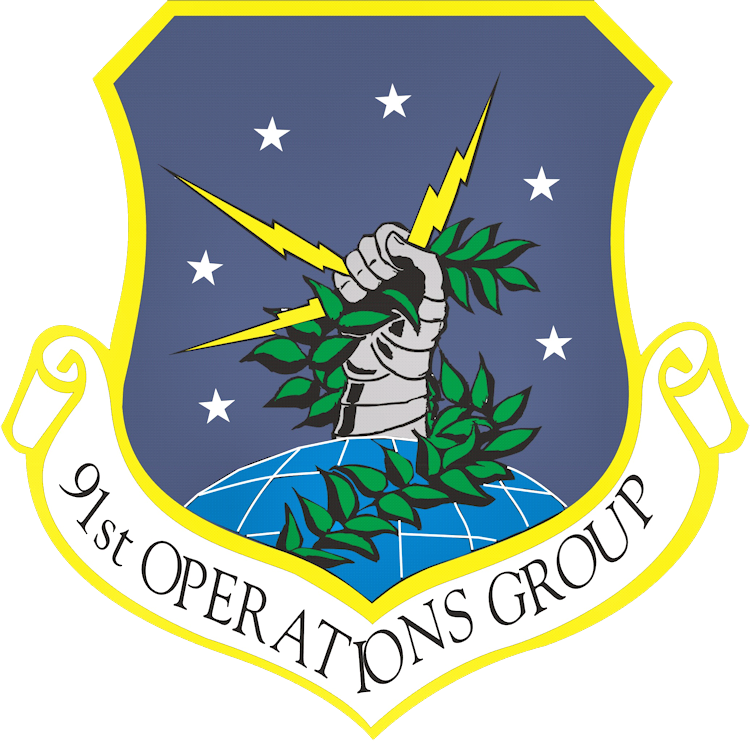
- 91st Operations Group emblem (Note: Approved 3 September 2019. The group uses the 91st wing emblem with the group designation on the scroll. AF Instruction 84-105, Organizational Lineage, Honors and History, 27 April 2017, paragraph 3.3.3.)

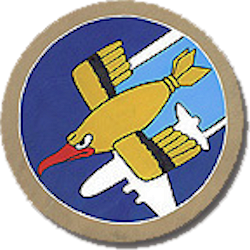
- 91st Bombardment Group World War II emblem.: Emblem of the 91st Bombardment Group
- 91st Bombardment Group World War II tail marking.: Triangle A

The 91st Operations Group is the operational component of the 91st Missile Wing, assigned to the Air Force Global Strike Command Twentieth Air Force. It is stationed at Minot Air Force Base, North Dakota.

The group is one of three USAF operational missile units, equipped with the LGM-30G Minuteman-III. Its mission is to defend the United States with safe and secure Intercontinental Ballistic Missiles (ICBMs); ready to immediately put bombs on target.

Activated as the World War II 91st Bombardment Group (Heavy), an Eighth Air Force B-17 Flying Fortress unit assigned to England, it was one of the first USAAF heavy bomb groups deployed to Europe in 1942. The 91st Bomb Group was stationed at RAF Bassingbourn and is most noted as the unit in which the bomber Memphis Belle flew, and for having suffered the greatest number of losses of any heavy bomb group in World War II.

As part of Strategic Air Command in the early years of the Cold War, the 91st Strategic Reconnaissance Group provided worldwide surveillance. Inactivated in 1952, the group was reactivated as the 91 OG in 1991. Its three missile squadrons, however, have no traditional link to the 91st Bombardment Group and were previously part of the 455th Strategic Missile Wing and 455th Bomb Group.

== Units ==
Through its four squadrons, the group remains a key facet of our nation's deterrent force. The four squadrons assigned to the group are the:

- 740th Missile Squadron
- 741st Missile Squadron
- 742d Missile Squadron
- 91st Operations Support Squadron

The missile squadrons include missile crewmembers, alert facility chefs and facility managers. These squadrons vigilantly maintain the missile force around-the-clock. Each squadron controls 50 launch facilities and five missile alert facilities. Missile squadrons are divided into missile operations flights and an operation support flight.

The missile operations flights are staffed by officer crewmembers who, when on alert, are responsible for day-to-day operations, maintenance and security of the missiles within their control and are prepared to launch their missiles at all times. Facility managers are responsible for and ensure the readiness of the missile alert facilities. The alert facility chefs are responsible for providing meals to missile alert facility personnel.

== History ==
For related lineage and history, see 91st Missile Wing

=== World War II ===
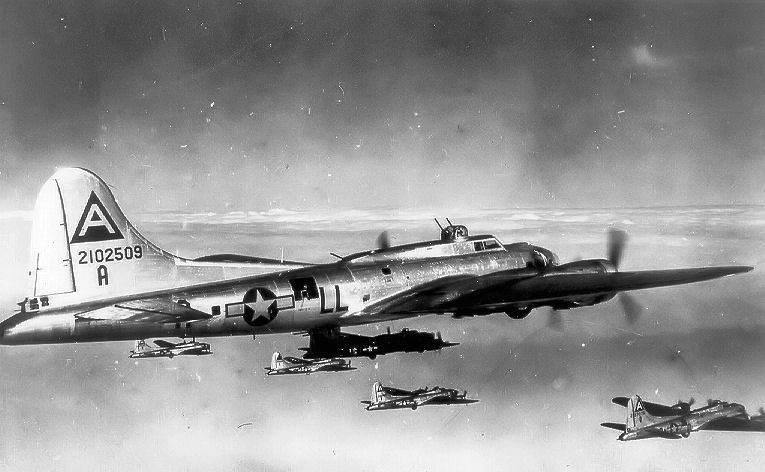
401st Bomb Squadron Boeing B-17G-50-BO Fortress 42-42-102509 *The Liberty Run* shot down by AAA over Leipzig, Germany 24 August 1944. The crew became prisoners of war.

Trained with B-17s before moving to England, August–October 1942. Entered combat in November 1942, bombing such targets as submarine pens, airdromes, factories, communication targets, shipbuilding yards, harbors, and dock facilities until mid-1943. When Eighth Air Force heavy bombers first penetrated Germany on 27 January 1943, the group attacked the navy yard at Wilhelmshaven. Earned a Distinguished Unit Citation (DUC) for bombing marshalling yards at Hamm on 4 March 1943, despite adverse weather and heavy opposition. From the middle of 1943 until the war ended, attacked aircraft factories, airfields, oil facilities, chemical industries and ball-bearing factories. Earned a second DUC for attacking vital aircraft factories in central Germany on 11 January 1944 despite inadequate fighter cover, heavy enemy opposition, and bad weather. In June 1944, contributed to the Allied invasion of Normandy by bombing gun emplacements and troop concentrations near the beachhead area. Supported the St. Lo breakthrough by attacking enemy troop positions, 24–25 July 1944. In December 1944 – January 1945, participated in the Battle of the Bulge by attacking enemy communication targets. The group supported the Allied crossing of the Rhine River in the spring of 1945 by striking airfields, bridges, and railroads near the front lines.

After the war ended, evacuated prisoners from German camps. Returned to the United States, June–July 1945

=== Cold War ===
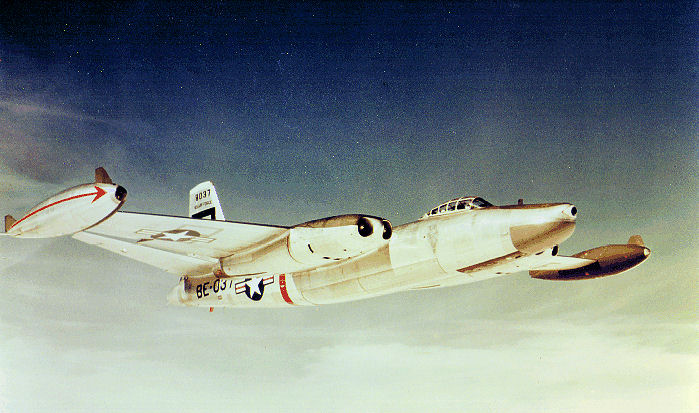
North American RB-45C Tornado 48-037, 91st Strategic Reconnaissance Group. Only 33 RB-45s were ever built and the 91st SRG was the main operating unit for this airframe.

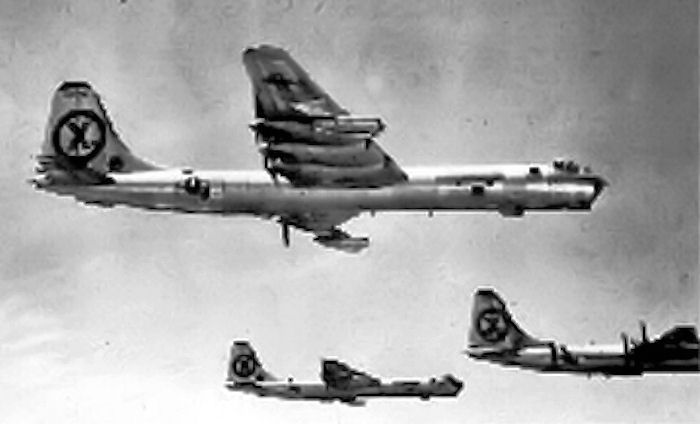
Flight of three Convair RB-36D Peacemakers used to fly high altitude reconnaissance over Manchuria

It was activated as a long-range photographic reconnaissance group under Strategic Air Command in July 1947, but was not fully manned until after July 1948. It saw combat in Korea from November 1950 until inactivating in May 1952 and conducted surveillance over Sea of Japan. During the Korean War, the 91st SRG eventually flew the largest number of different airframes in the Korean War and had more assigned personnel than any other flying unit in the Korean War. With over 800 assigned personnel, they had six different types of aircraft assigned: the RB-29, RB-50, RB-45, WB-26, KB-29 and RB-36. Throughout the conflict though, the RB-29 and RB-50s were the workhorses of the unit. The RB-50 was a modification of the high-altitude bomber built towards the end of World War II to bomb Japan.

The 91st worked a number of different missions during the Korean War. In addition to bomb damage assessment, targeting and aerial photography for the Bomber Command and FEAF, the 91st conducted ELINT and "ferret" missions in theater. It conducted the first ferret missions ever conducted by the USAF. Overflights of Soviet-controlled Far East islands began in 1951. An example of this type of work was reconnaissance missions which were conducted over Karafuto following reports that the Soviets had built extensive underground installations and missile-launching facilities on the island. In Project 51, 91st SRW RB-45s took off from Yokota AB, Japan to conduct reconnaissance over the southern portions of Sakhalin Island. Photographic and radar reconnaissance overflight missions were also flown over the Murmansk-Kola inlet and Siberia.

The unit was also called upon to conduct psychological leaflet drops with its assigned RB-29 aircraft. Not only did the 91st drop Korean "Psyops" leaflets throughout the Korean peninsula and into Manchuria and China but Russian-language leaflets were also committed to air bases in the Far East where Russian pilots were suspected of flying from.

91st aircraft also provided the Air Force's first air-to-air refueling capability and is credited with the first refueling conducted in combat. In February 1951, it lost most of its personnel when assigned to the parent wing, and was inactivated in May 1952 as part of the Tri-Deputation reorganization.

=== A new era ===
Between September 1991 and July 1994, and since February 1996, maintained intercontinental ballistic missiles on alert at Minot AFB, ND.

=== Lineage ===
- Established as the 91st Bombardment Group (Heavy) on 28 January 1942

Activated on 15 April 1942
Redesignated 91st Bombardment Group, Heavy' on 20 August 1943
Inactivated on 7 November 1945

- Redesignated 91st Reconnaissance Group on 11 June 1947

Activated on 1 July 1947
Redesignated: 91st Strategic Reconnaissance Group on 10 November 1948
Redesignated: 91st Strategic Reconnaissance Group, Medium on 6 July 1950
Inactivated on 28 May 1952

- Redesignated 91st Operations Group on 29 August 1991

Activated on 1 September 1991
Inactivated on 1 July 1994

- Activated on 1 February 1996

=== Assignments ===
- III Bomber Command, 15 April 1942
- II Bomber Command, c. 28 June 1942
- VIII Bomber Command, c. 12 September 1942
- 1st Bombardment Wing (later 1st Combat Bombardment Wing), September 1942 (attached to 101st Provisional Heavy Bombardment Combat Wing after 22 May 1943)
- 1st Bombardment Division (later 1st Air Division), 13 September 1943 – June 1945 (under operational control of 1st Bombardment Wing (later 1st Bombardment Wing))
- Third Air Force, 3 July-7 November 1945
- Strategic Air Command, 1 July 1947
- 311th Reconnaissance Wing (later 311th Air Division), 1 October 1947
- 91st Strategic Reconnaissance Wing, 10 November 1948 – 28 May 1952 (not operational after 10 February 1951)
- 91st Missile Wing (later 91st Space Wing), 1 September 1991 – 1 July 1994
- 91st Space Wing (later 1st Missile Wing), 1 February 1996–present

=== Components ===
- 16th Photographic Reconnaissance Squadron: attached 20 August-9 November 1948
- 91st Strategic Reconnaissance Squadron: 25 March 1949 – 16 November 1950
- 91st Air Refueling Squadron 16 April 1950 – 28 May 1952. (detached 10 February 1951 – 28 May 1952)
- 322d Bombardment Squadron (later 322d Strategic Reconnaissance Squadron): 15 April 1942 – 7 November 1945; 6 July 1950 – 28 May 1952 (attached to 91st Strategic Reconnaissance Wing after 10 February 1951)
- 323d Bombardment Squadron (later 323d Reconnaissance Squadron, 323d Strategic Reconnaissance Squadron): 15 April 1942 – 7 November 1945; 1 July 1947 – 10 November 1948; 1 June 1949 – 28 May 1952 (detached 19 September-10 October 1949 and attached to 91st Strategic Reconnaissance Wing after 10 February 1951)
- 324th Bombardment (later, 324th Reconnaissance, 324th Strategic Reconnaissance) Squadron: 15 April 1942 – 7 November 1945; 1 July 1947 – 28 May 1952 (attached to 91st Strategic Reconnaissance Wing after 10 February 1951)
- 11th Reconnaissance Squadron (later 401st Bombardment Squadron): 15 April 1942 – 7 November 1945
- 740th Missile Squadron: 1 September 1991 – 1 July 1994; 1 February 1996–present
- 741st Missile Squadron: 1 September 1991 – 1 July 1994; 1 February 1996–present
- 742d Missile Squadron: 1 September 1991 – 1 July 1994; 1 February 1996–present

=== Stations ===
- Harding Field, Louisiana, 15 April 1942
- MacDill Field, Florida, 16 May 1942
- Walla Walla Army Air Base, Washington, c. 28 June-24 August 1942
- RAF Kimbolton (AAF-117), England, 13 September 1942 (ground echelon), early October 1942 (air echelon)
- RAF Bassingbourn (AAF-121), England, 14 October 1942 – 23 June 1945
- Drew Field, Florida, 3 July-7 November 1945
- Andrews Field (later Andrews Air Force Base), Maryland, 1 July 1947
- McGuire Air Force Base, New Jersey, 20 July 1948
- Barksdale Air Force Base, Louisiana, 1 October 1949

Elements deployed to Johnson Air Base and Yokota Air Base, Japan July 1950, remaining until group's inactivation in 1952.

- Lockbourne Air Force Base, Ohio, 11 September 1951 – 28 May 1952
- Minot Air Force Base, North Dakota, 1 September 1991 – 1 July 1994
- Minot Air Force Base, North Dakota, 1 February 1996–present

=== Aircraft and missiles ===
- B-17 Flying Fortress, 1942–1945; (RB-17) 1949
- B/RB-29 Superfortress, 1949–1950
- B-50 Superfortress, 1949–1950; KB-29 (Tanker), 1950–1952
- B/RB-45 Tornado, 1950–1952
- LGM-30G Minuteman III, 1991–1994; 1996–present
