= Moosbierbaum =

Coordinates: 48°18′54″N 15°54′16″E

Wetzlar
- Industry: Gunpowder
- Headquarters: Moosbierbaum, Austria
- Parent: Škoda

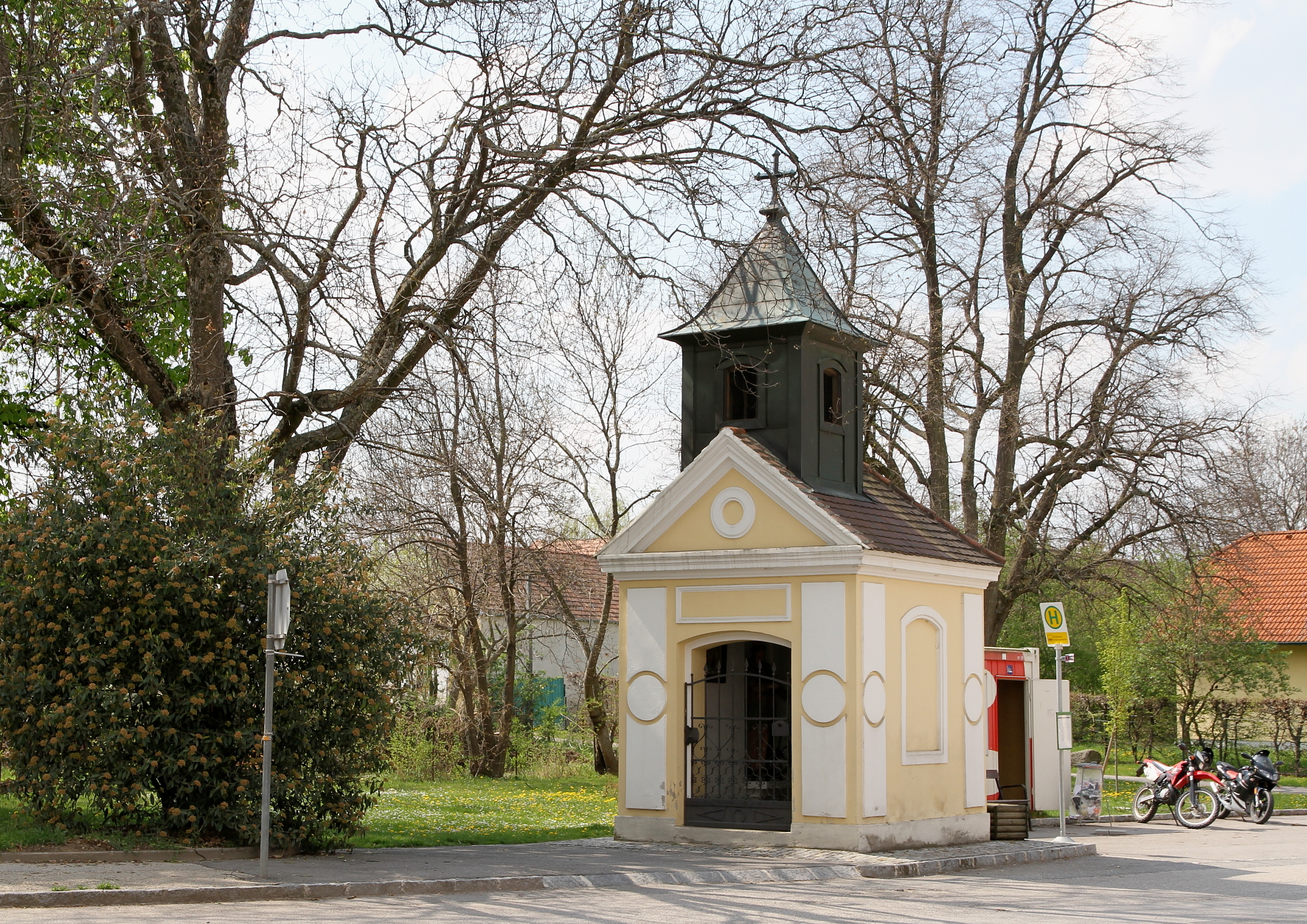
A chapel in Moosbierbaum

Moosbierbaum is part of the municipality (commune) of Atzenbrugg in the Lower Austria.

== History ==
In 1913, the Škoda Wetzlar gunpowder factory was established in Moosbierbaum as a subsidiary of IG Farben AG. As a target of the Oil Campaign of World War II, Moosbierbaum had a chemical works which performed 60,000 tons/year of Naphtha dehydrogenation, and an adjacent refinery for the oil from Zistersdorf.

The only surviving structure of the chemical plant is the administration building, which now serves as a hotel and restaurant for the adjacent golf-course.

Singer contralto Hilde Rössel-Majdan was a native of Moosbierbaum.
