= Charles Carpenter (pilot) =

United States Army officer and pilot (1912–1966)

Charles M. Carpenter
- Carpenter with his L-4 Grasshopper, Rosie the Rocketer, armed with two trios of bazookas mounted on the jury struts
- Born: August 29, 1912; Edgington, Illinois, US
- Died: March 22, 1966 (aged 53); Champaign, Illinois, US
- Military career
- Allegiance: United States
- Branch: United States Army
- Service years: 1942–1946
- Rank: Lieutenant Colonel
- Nickname: "Bazooka Charlie"
- Conflicts: World War II
- Awards: Silver Star; Bronze Star Medal; Air Medal (2)
- Other work: Teacher

Charles Marston "Bazooka Charlie" Carpenter (August 29, 1912 – March 22, 1966) was a United States Army officer and army observation pilot who served in World War II. He is best known for destroying several enemy armored vehicles in his bazooka-equipped L-4 Grasshopper light observation aircraft.

== Early life ==
Carpenter was born in rural Illinois, one of six siblings: three boys and three girls. Carpenter grew up in Reynolds, near the town of Edgington, Illinois. He was educated – on scholarships – at the Roosevelt Military Academy, in Aledo, Illinois and at Centre College, in Danville, Kentucky.

== World War II service ==
Upon arriving in France in 1944, Carpenter was assigned an L-4 Grasshopper for artillery spotter role and reconnaissance missions. Assuming a 150-pound (68 kg) pilot and no radio aboard, the L-4H had a remaining cargo or passenger weight capacity of approximately 232 pounds (105 kg). The additional weight of radio and radio operator often exceeded this limit. Inspired by other L-4 pilots who had installed bazookas as anti-tank armament on their planes, Carpenter added bazooka launchers to his plane as well.

Within a few weeks, on September 20, 1944, during the Battle of Arracourt, Carpenter was credited with knocking out a German armored car and four tanks. Carpenter's plane, bearing USAAF serial number 43-30426, was known as Rosie the Rocketer (a play on Rosie the Riveter), and his exploits were soon featured in numerous press accounts, including Stars and Stripes, the Associated Press, Popular Science, the New York Sun, and Liberty magazine. Carpenter once told a reporter that his idea of fighting a war was to "attack, attack and then attack again."

After destroying his fifth enemy tank, Carpenter told a Stars and Stripes correspondent that the "word must be getting around to watch out for Cubs with bazookas on them. Every time I show up now they shoot with everything they have. They never used to bother Cubs. Bazookas must be bothering them a bit."

By war's end, Major Carpenter had destroyed or disabled several German armored cars and tanks (he was officially credited with six tanks destroyed).

Carpenter's awards included:

- Silver Star
- Bronze Star Medal
- Air Medal, with Oak Leaf Cluster
- European–African–Middle Eastern Campaign Medal, with 4 campaign stars
- American Campaign Medal
- World War II Victory Medal

== Postwar service ==
In 1945, Carpenter became seriously ill and was diagnosed with Hodgkins disease. Doctors gave him two years to live. He received an honorable discharge from the U.S. Army in 1946. Thereafter, he returned to work as a history teacher at Urbana High School in Urbana, Illinois, where he remained until his death in 1966 at the age of 53.

== Rosie the Rocketer ==
In October 2017, the L-4H that Carpenter flew in World War II – s/n 43-30426 – was identified in the collections of the Austrian Aviation Museum (German: Österreichisches Luftfahrtmuseum) at Graz Airport. It was acquired by the Collings Foundation and returned to its World War II appearance, by a restorer in La Pine, Oregon. The restoration was reported as complete on July 4, 2020 and the aircraft is now on public display, at the Collings Foundation's American Heritage Museum.
