= Collings Foundation =

Aviation and automotive preservation foundation in Massachusetts, United States

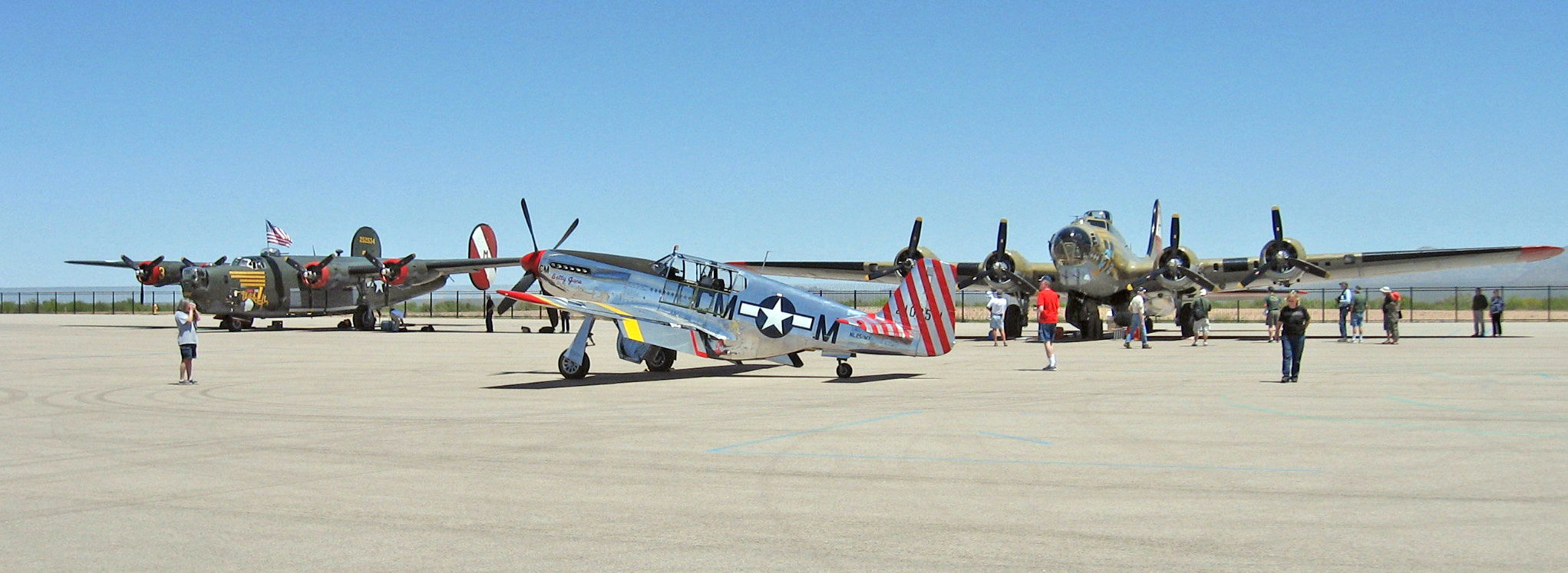
- Collings Foundation's B-24J, TP-51C and B-17G

- Location within Massachusetts
- Established: 1979
- Location: Stow, Massachusetts, U.S.
- Coordinates: 42.403293°N 71.5078°W
- Type: Aviation museum; Automotive museum
- Founder: Bob Collings
- CEO: Rob Collings
- Website: www.collingsfoundation.org

The Collings Foundation is a private non-profit educational foundation located in Stow, Massachusetts, with a mission dedicated to the preservation and public display of transportation-related history, namely automobile and aviation history. The Collings Foundation is headquartered at a small private airfield in Stow that includes a small museum that opens for special events and pre-scheduled tour groups.

The American Heritage Museum, a collection of military vehicles, is located on the grounds of the foundation. The organization also has a satellite operations base at Ellington Field in Houston, Texas, primarily housing its Korean War and Vietnam War jet aircraft and helicopter collection.

The Collings Foundation operated two touring collections of historic military aircraft: The Wings of Freedom Tour and The Vietnam Memorial Flight. The Wings of Freedom tour ended in 2023 after the organization grounded their WWII aircraft.

The Collings Foundation sold vintage warbird rides to the general public through a flight exemption until permission for such flights was revoked by the Federal Aviation Administration following the fatal 2019 crash of the foundation's B-17G.

== History ==
The organization was founded in 1979 by former Data Terminal Systems chairman Robert F. Collings and his wife Caroline Collings. As of April 2020, Caroline Collings continues to serve as financial director, while son Rob Collings is the CEO and chief pilot of the foundation.

On July 4, 2013, the Military Vehicle Technology Foundation founded by Jacques Littlefield and located in Portola Valley, California, donated their entire collection of military vehicles to the Collings Foundation. A year later, the Collings Foundation auctioned off 120 of the vehicles to fund creation of a new museum at their headquarters. The remaining vehicles are now the centerpiece of the American Heritage Museum in Stow, Massachusetts.

In 2015, the Stow Planning Board questioned the educational merit of the proposed museum. The educational purpose was needed in order to allow the planned 60,000-square-foot (5,600 m^{2}) museum to be built on land that was zoned for residential use. The Planning Board rejected the foundation's application in August 2015 but a settlement was eventually reached in July 2017 and construction of the museum was completed in 2018. The museum held a "preview" opening in October 2018 and fully opened in May 2019.

The foundation acquired 9 of 25 airplanes for sale from the Evergreen Aviation and Space Museum in exchange for helping the museum out of bankruptcy in May 2015.

The organization's B-17G Flying Fortress crashed in October, 2019, killing seven of the thirteen people on board. In March 2020, the organization's permission to carry passengers was revoked by the Federal Aviation Administration (FAA), citing “notable maintenance discrepancies” and a failure to maintain a “a culture of safety” leading up to the crash.

In 2023, it traded a Stearman PT-17 to the National Museum of the United States Air Force in exchange for a Republic P-47 Thunderbolt. The following month, an original Nieuport 28 owned by the foundation was damaged in an accident. Later that year, it announced it would be ending its Wings of Freedom tour and grounding its aircraft.

== Collection ==
=== Aircraft collection ===
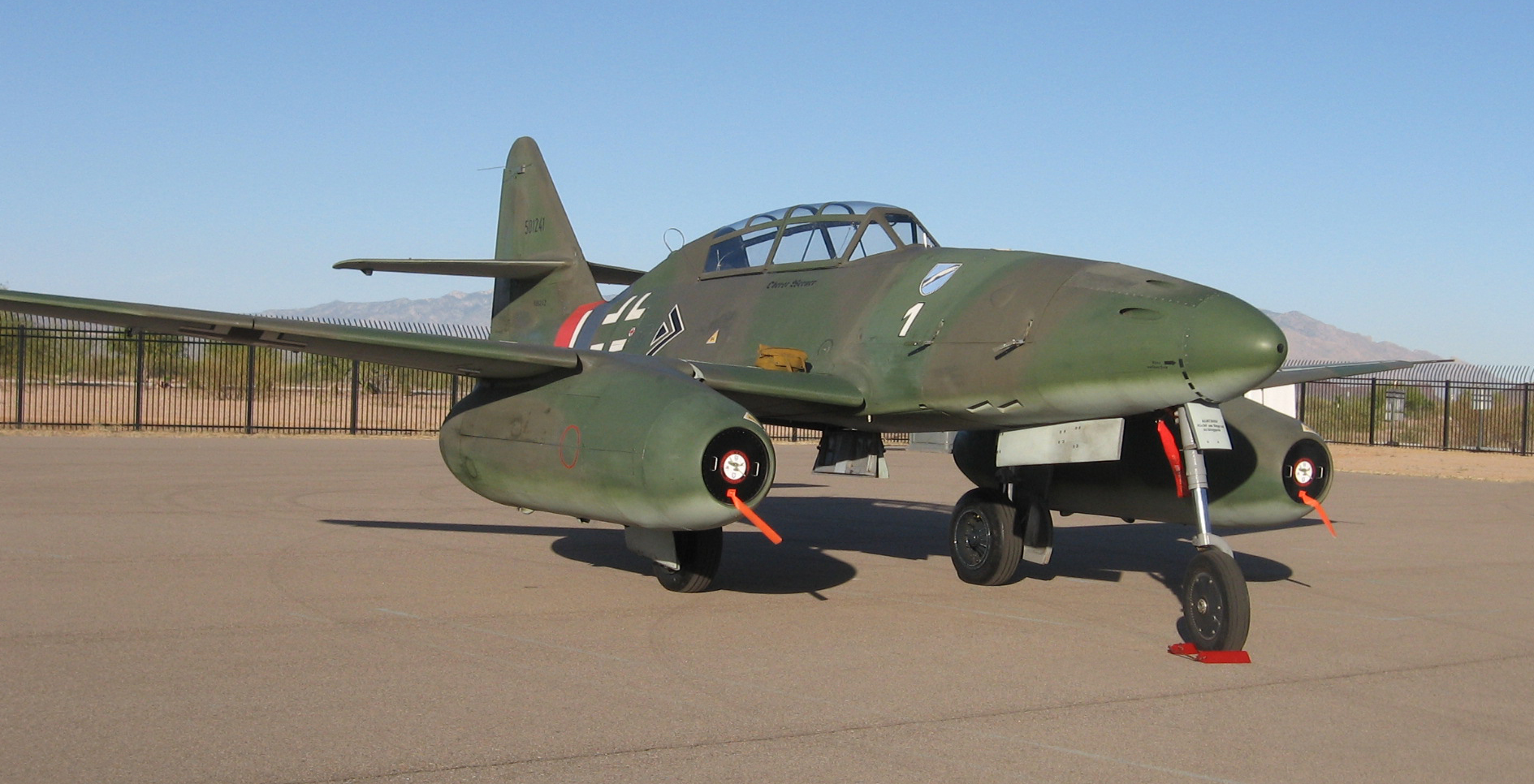
Me 262B "White 1"

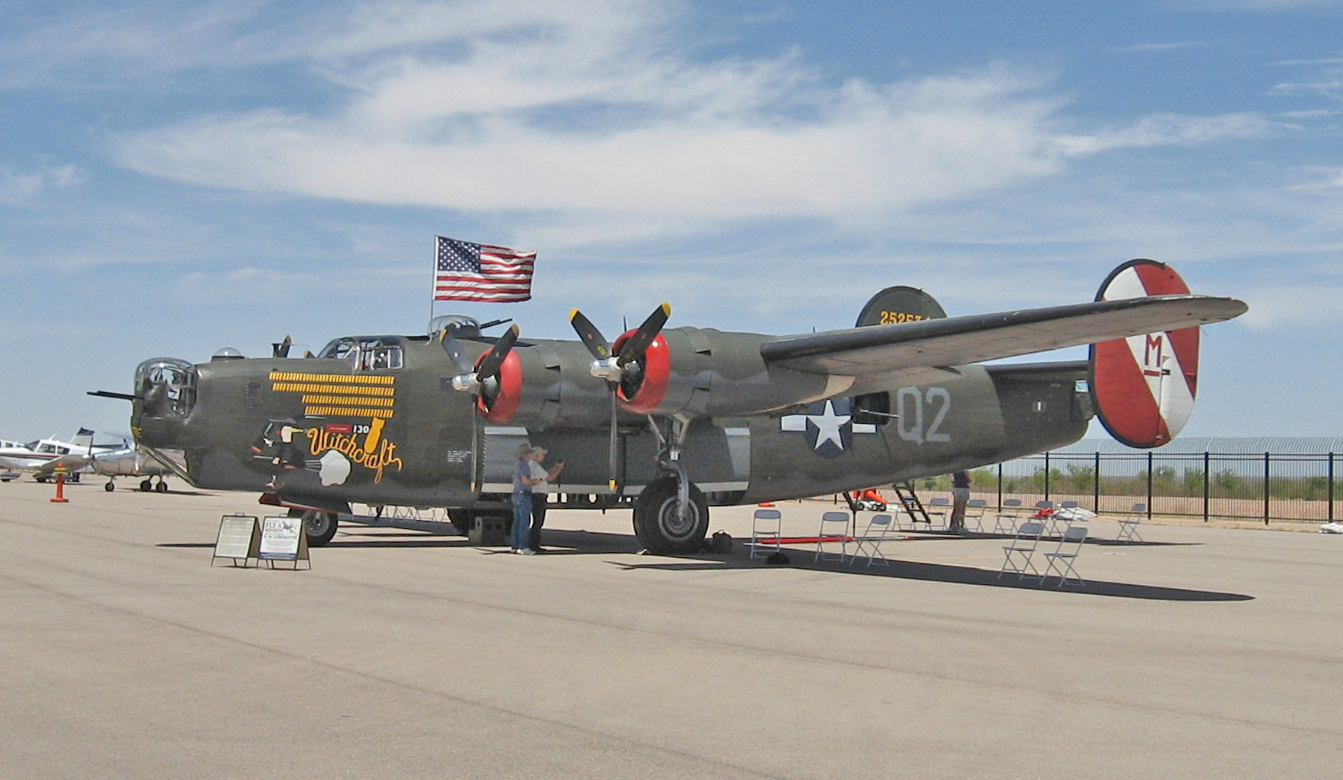
Collings Foundation's B-24J "Witchcraft"

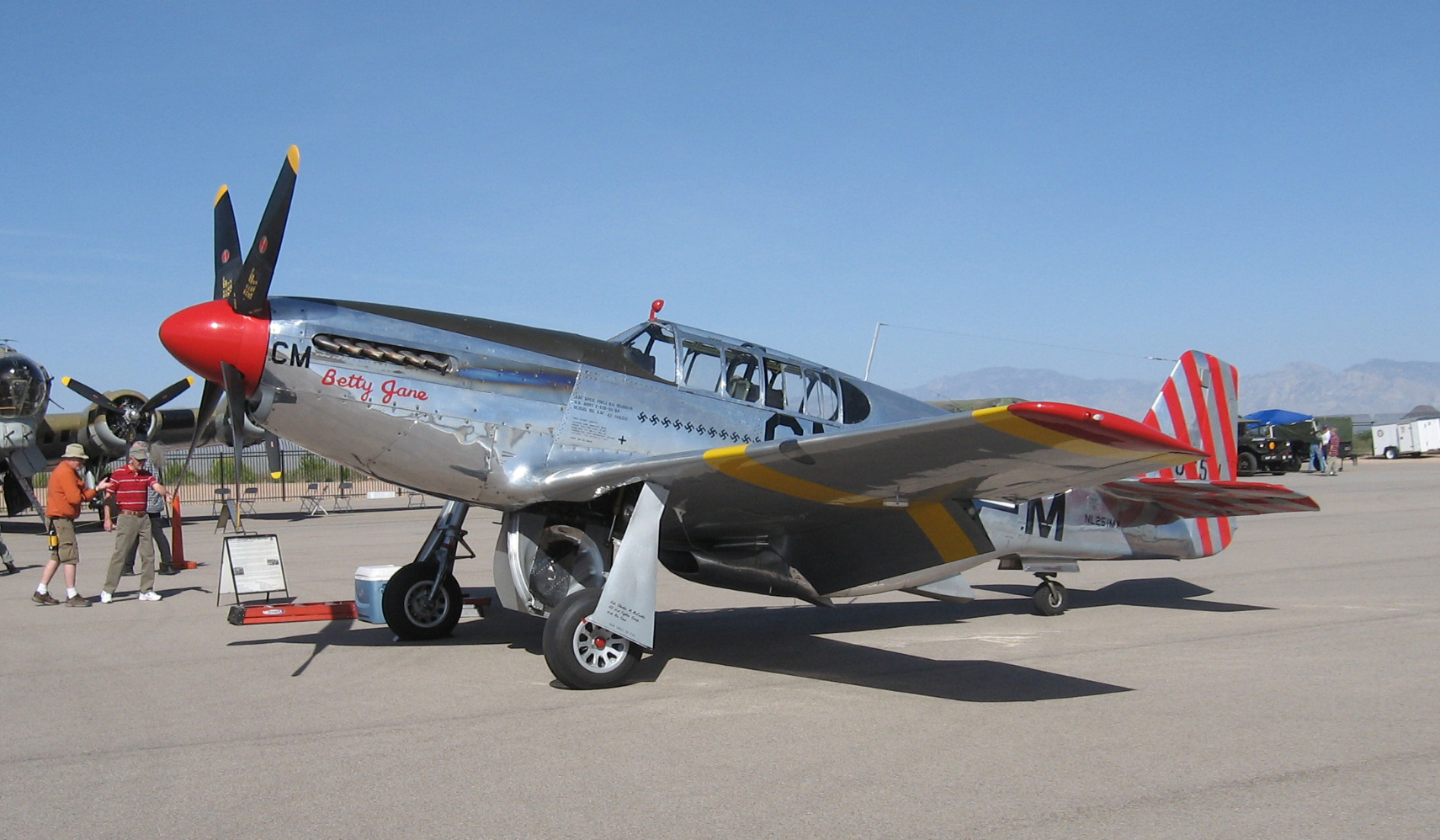
Collings Foundation's TP-51C "Betty Jane"

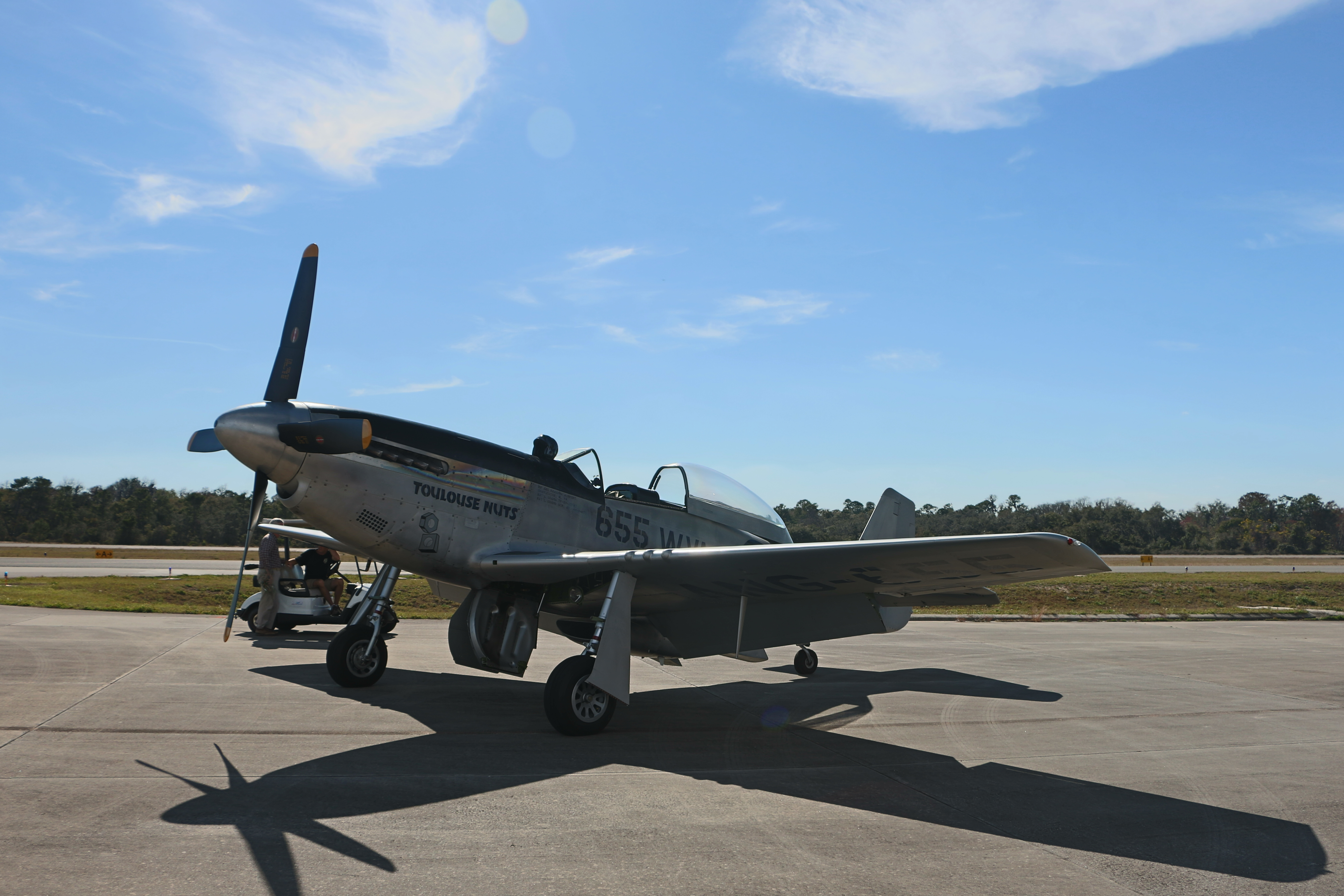
Collings Foundation's TF-51D "Toulouse Nuts"

==== Airworthy aircraft ====
- Bell UH-1E Iroquois
- Bleriot XI – replica
- Boeing PT-17 Kaydet
- Cessna UC-78 Bobcat
- Consolidated B-24J Liberator "Witchcraft"
- Curtiss Headless Pusher
- Curtiss Model F
- Curtiss P-40B Tomahawk
- Curtiss TP-40N Warhawk
- Douglas A-1E Skyraider
- Douglas TA-4J Skyhawk
- Grumman FM-2 Wildcat
- Grumman TBM-3E Avenger
- Grumman F6F-3 Hellcat
- Lockheed P-38L Lightning "Pudgy V"
- Lockheed T-33
- McDonnell Douglas F-4D Phantom II
- Messerschmitt Me 262 Schwalbe "White 1" – Reproduction
- Morane-Saulnier MS.500 Criquet – pained as Fi 156
- North American A-36 Mustang
- North American AT-6 Texan
- North American B-25J Mitchell "Tondelayo"
- North American F-100F Super Sabre
- North American TF-51D Mustang "Toulouse Nuts"
- North American TP-51C Mustang "Betty Jane"
- Supermarine Spitfire IX
- Vought F4U-5NL Corsair
- Waco UPF-7

==== Static aircraft ====
- Lockheed T-33
- Messerschmitt Bf 109 G-10
- Wright Model EX "Vin Fiz Flyer" – Replica

==== Aircraft under restoration ====
- Boeing B-17 Flying Fortress 44-83785
- Consolidated PBY-5A Catalina
- Douglas A-26B Invader
- Fairchild PT-19
- Focke-Wulf Fw 190 F-8 "White One", Werknummer 931 862
- Focke-Wulf Fw 190 D-9 "White Two"
- Grumman G-21 Goose
- Nieuport 28
- Piper L-4H Grasshopper 43-30426 "Rosie the Rocketer" (flown by then-Major Charles Carpenter in France, 1944).

=== Automobile collection ===
==== Brass era ====
- 1901 Oldsmobile Curved Dash
- 1904 Franklin Type A Roadster
- 1906 Pope Waverly Electric Carriage, original un-restored
- 1906 Stanley Steamer Touring Car (20 hp)
- 1908 Cadillac Open Roadster Runabout
- 1913 Ford Model T Touring Car
- 1913 Mercer Speedster Raceabout (replica)
- 1914 Stutz Bearcat
- 1915 Buick Touring Car
- 1916 Chalmers Model 120 Sedan
- 1916 Chevrolet Baby Grand Touring
- 1916 Oldsmobile Model 44 Touring Car
- 1919 Willys-Sterns Knight Touring Car

==== Roaring 20s ====
- 1921 Marmon Model 34 Speedster
- 1924 Ford Model T
- 1926 Chevrolet Woody Depot Hack

==== Classic era ====
- 1927 Rolls-Royce Springfield Phantom 1 Phaeton
- 1928 Packard Model 533 Sedan
- 1928 Chrysler Model 72 Roadster
- 1928 Packard Phaeton
- 1928 Pierce Arrow Series 81 Limousine
- 1929 LaSalle Model 2H
- 1929 Pontiac Model F Cabriolet
- 1930 Cord Model L29 Convertible Coupe
- 1931 Studebaker President
- 1932 Duesenberg SJ Dual-Cowl Phaeton
- 1935 Packard Model 1208, Convertible Sedan
- 1936 Auburn Boat-Tail Speedster
- 1937 Cord Model 812 Phaeton

==== Celebrity cars ====
- 1940 Cadillac Limousine V-16, owned by Al Capone, original un-restored

==== Indianapolis 500 cars ====
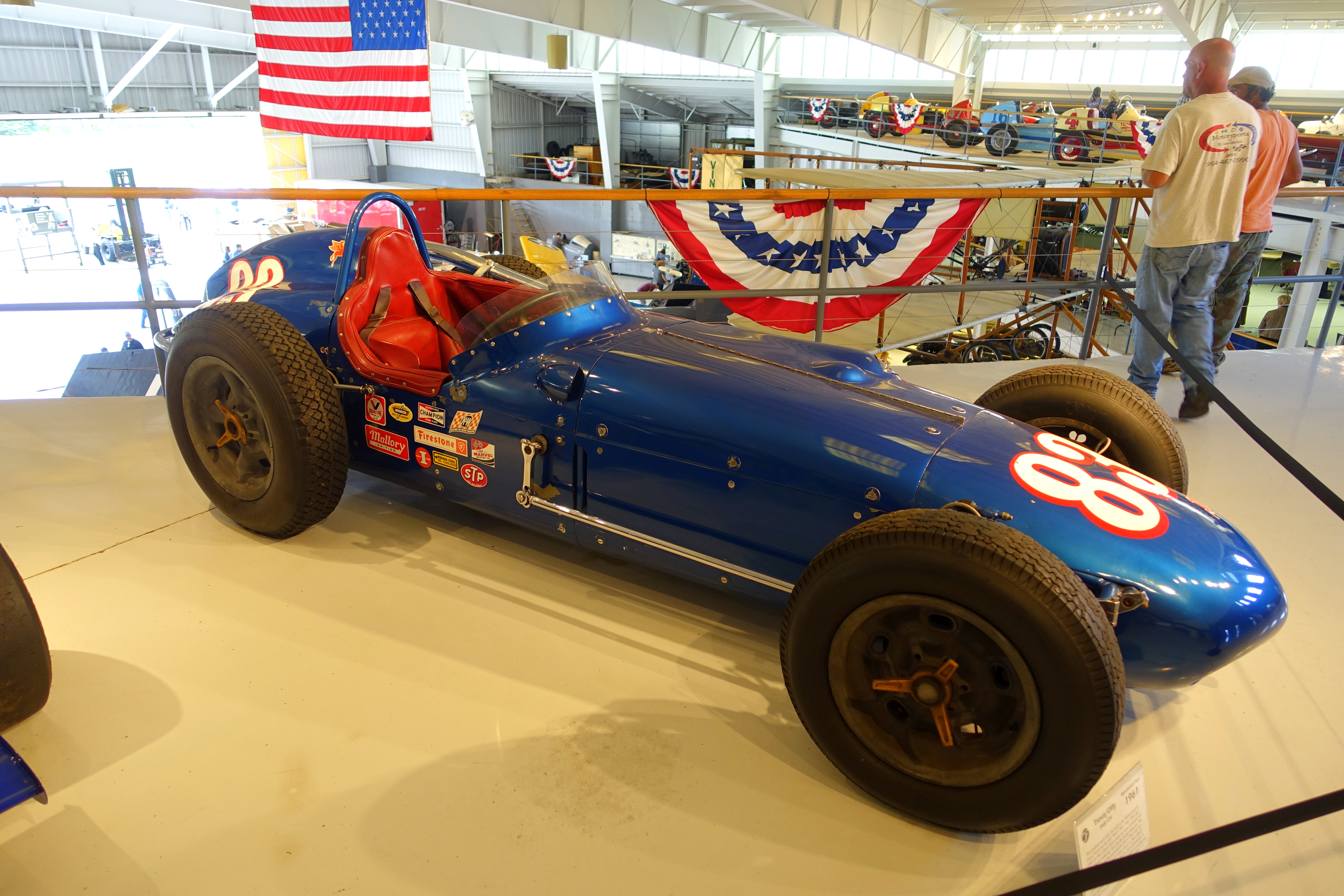
Trevis/Offy, 1961

- 1961 Trevis/Offy – Trevis team car, sister car to the 1961 winner. Ran Indy 1961–1964.
- 1972 Gurney Eagle/Turbo Offy – Leader card Spl. Team car. Ran Indy 1972–1974.
- 1979 Porsche Indy – The factory race car that smashed all track records before being banned.
- 1980 Penske PC-9/Cosworth DFX – Mario Andretti's Michigan 500 winner. Ran Indy.
- 1980, Qualified second with Mario Andretti. Also driven to victory by Rick Mears at the Copa Mexico 125.
- 1987 March/Buick – Rich Vogler's best Indy effort
- 1995 Lola/Ford XB – Michael Andretti's race winning car

==== Other race cars ====
- 1996 Rilley & Scott MkIII/Ford winner of the 1997 Rolex 24 hours of Daytona
- 1990 Nissan 300ZX- Factory team car winner of the 24 hours of Daytona, 12 hours of Sebring and the Drivers and constructors championship
- 1993 Porsche RS America- Rolex 24 and Sebring 12 hour veteran, the first team car of Champion Porsche

==== Sprint cars: 1920s–WWII ====
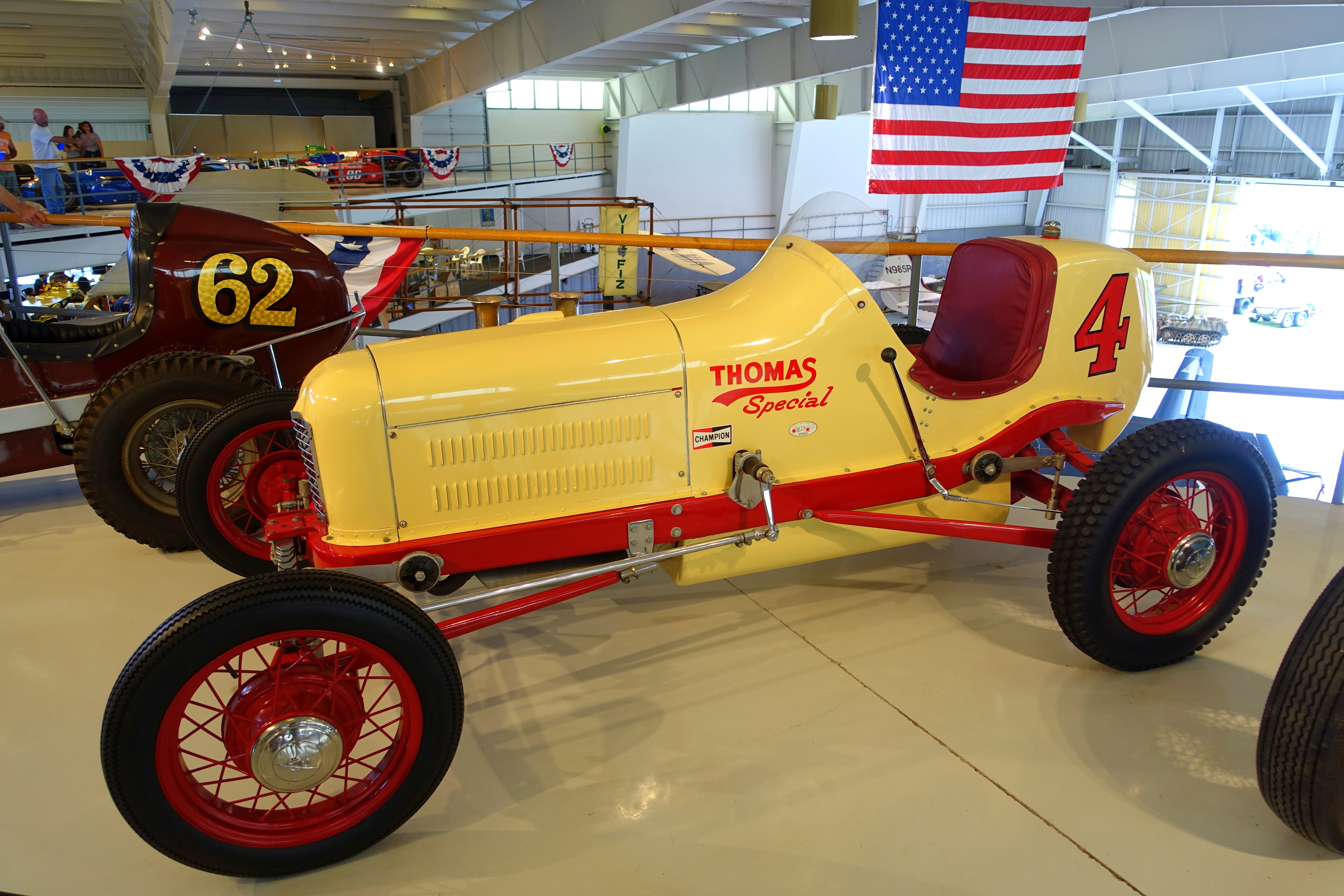
Thomas Special, 1936

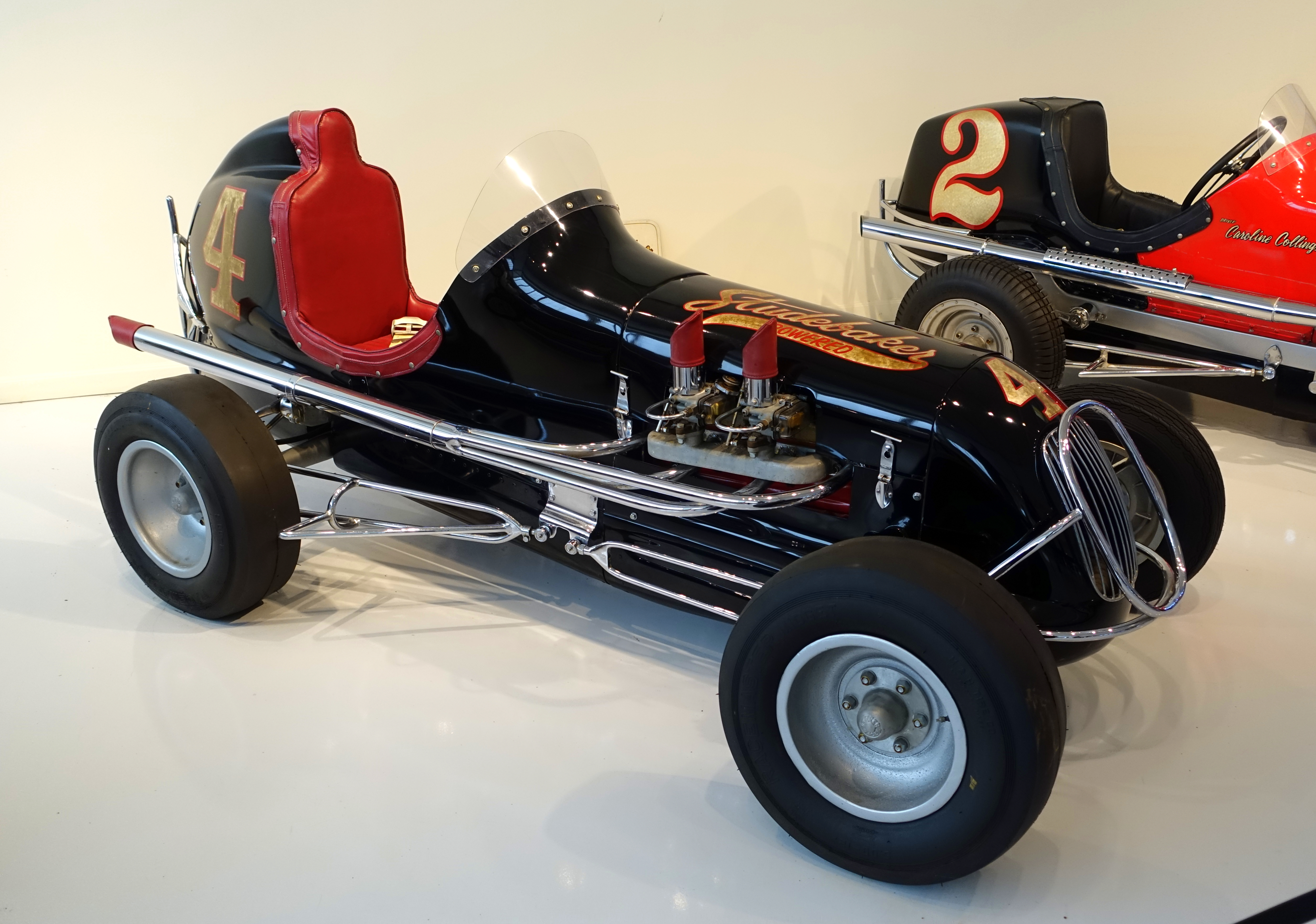
Studebaker powered midget car, 1946

- 1932 Crager-Ford
- 1932 Gemsa Ford
- 1936 Thomas Spl.
- 1937 Offy 270 ci.
- 1937 Rutherford – winner of over 300 races!
- 1937 Ranger-Aircraft Engine
- Drayer-Ford
- Riley Four Port

==== Sprint cars: post WWII-1950s ====
- 1950 Ford/Offy

==== Midget racers: 1930s-1950s ====
- 1936 Sowers- a rare Offy derivative
- Caruso-Offy 110 ci. supercharged by Maserati
- Studebaker
- Elto Outboard
- Indian
- (3) Ford V-8/60

==== Military vehicles ====
- 1917 Vim "Camp Devens Express"
- 1916 Ford Model T ambulance
- 1942 Ford Jeep, GPW Willys MB
- 1943 White Motor Co. M16 half-track
- M1917 6-ton tank (American version of the Renault FT)
- Panzer I. A
- Panzer V "Panther" Ausf. A. only running Panther in the USA
- Mercedes G4 staff car
- Vickers Mk. IV light tank
- Sherman turret trainer
- M3 Lee
- Matilda MK.II tank
- Sd.Kfz. 10 1-ton – German half-track personnel carrier/prime mover
- Leichter Panzerspähwagen Sd.Kfz. 222 armored scout car – Germany
- BMW R75 motorcycle and side car
- M3A1 scout car
- M5A1 Stuart light tank
- VW Kübelwagen Type 82
- Schwimmwagen Type 166
- T-34/76 Tank
- Sd.Kfz. 251/1 Ausf. D armored half-track
- Sd.Kfz. 2 Kleines Kettenkrad "track-cycle"
- LCVP "Higgins Boat"
- Cromwell I tank
- Jagdpanzer 38t Hetzer
- M4A3E2 Sherman "Jumbo" tank
- M16 MGMC half-track
- M8 Scott
- M22 Locust airborne tank
- M18 Hellcat tank destroyer
- A34 Comet
- IS-2 Iosef Stalin
- SU-100
- Sd.Kfz. 8 12-ton German half-track
- Kommandogerät 38
- V-1 "JB-2 Loon"
- M8 Greyhound
- LVT(A)-4 landing vehicle
- M29C Weasel
- Daimler Dingo Mk1
- M3 Gun Motor Carriage
- M7 Priest SPH
- M26A1 Pershing
- M24 Chaffee
- M39 armored utility vehicle
- M2A1 Bradley fighting vehicle
- ZPU-23 anti-aircraft gun
- M41 Walker Bulldog
- M48 Patton
- PT-76 amphibious tank
- T-72M
- M551 Sheridan
- M60A1
- T-55
- MAZ-7310/Scud-B missile launcher
- ZSU-23-4 SHILKA anti-aircraft tank
- 2S1 GVOZDIKA
- M1A1 Abrams tank
- QinetiQ TALON robot
- iRobot PackBot

==== Trucks and farm vehicles ====
- 1909 Peerless steam tractor
- 1915 Walker electric truck
- 1920s International Harvester
- 1931 Diamond T truck
- 1931 Chevrolet Model C cab-truck
