= Military Vehicle Technology Foundation =

- Former location of the collection
- Established: 1998
- Dissolved: 2018
- Location: Portola Valley, California
- Coordinates: 37.200978°N 122.112816°W
- Type: Military museum
- Founder: Jacques Littlefield (1949–2009)

The Military Vehicle Technology Foundation was a large collection of military vehicles located in Portola Valley, California. It was founded in 1998 by Jacques Littlefield, and closed in 2018, with its collection being distributed to other museums. Many of its vehicles are now part of the American Heritage Museum run by the Collings Foundation in Stow, Massachusetts.

== History ==
The first acquisition was an unrestored M3A1 Scout Car. The first two tanks arrived on site in 1983, and by 1988 the collection comprised five armored vehicles. Subsequent military vehicles and associated equipment were acquired from dealers, collectors, or in trade with various museums or government agencies in the United States and abroad. By the middle of the 1990s the collection included examples from almost all historically significant land battles of the last half-century. The oldest armored military vehicle in the collection is a World War I era M1917 light tank.

The Foundation was established in early 1998. Littlefield's major objective for the Foundation was to preserve the collection for the future. Over 200 armored fighting vehicles were present in the collection, displayed in a 48,000 square feet (4,500 m^{2}) exhibition space at Littlefield's 470-acre (190 ha) Pony Tracks Ranch in the Vista Verde neighborhood. The ranch was once owned by former San Francisco Mayor and California Governor "Sunny Jim" Rolph. The foundation offered tours of its collection with a mandatory donation until the inventory was transported to the new museum in Stow.

In 2012 the foundation started a new program in conjunction with the Boy Scouts of America to start the youth Venturing Crew 551. Crew 551's stated goals were to assist in the restoration of vehicles, and to help educate the public through tours and presentations about the significance of armored vehicles throughout history.

=== Collings Foundation ===
Jacques Littlefield died after a decade-long battle with colon cancer on January 7, 2009. The foundation signed over its collection to the Collings Foundation on July 4, 2013. A year later, the Collings Foundation auctioned off 120 of the vehicles to fund creation of the new American Heritage Museum to display the collection at the Collings Foundation headquarters in Stow, Massachusetts.

In 2015, the Stow Planning Board questioned the educational merit of the proposed museum. The educational purpose was needed in order to allow the planned 60,000-square-foot (5,600 m^{2}) museum to be built on land that was zoned for residential use. The Planning Board rejected the foundation's application in August 2015 but a settlement was eventually reached in July 2017 and construction of the museum was completed in 2018. The museum held a "preview" opening in October 2018 and fully opened in May 2019.

The MVTF officially closed for tours on March 25, 2018. The last of the vehicles left the premises on July 30, 2018.

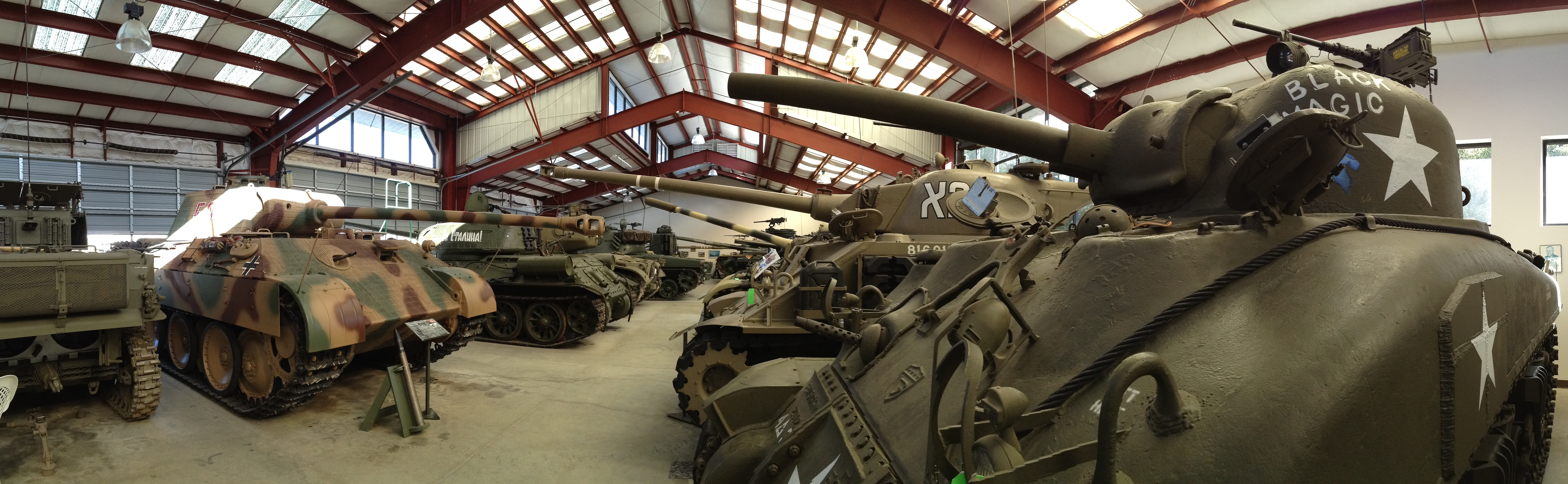

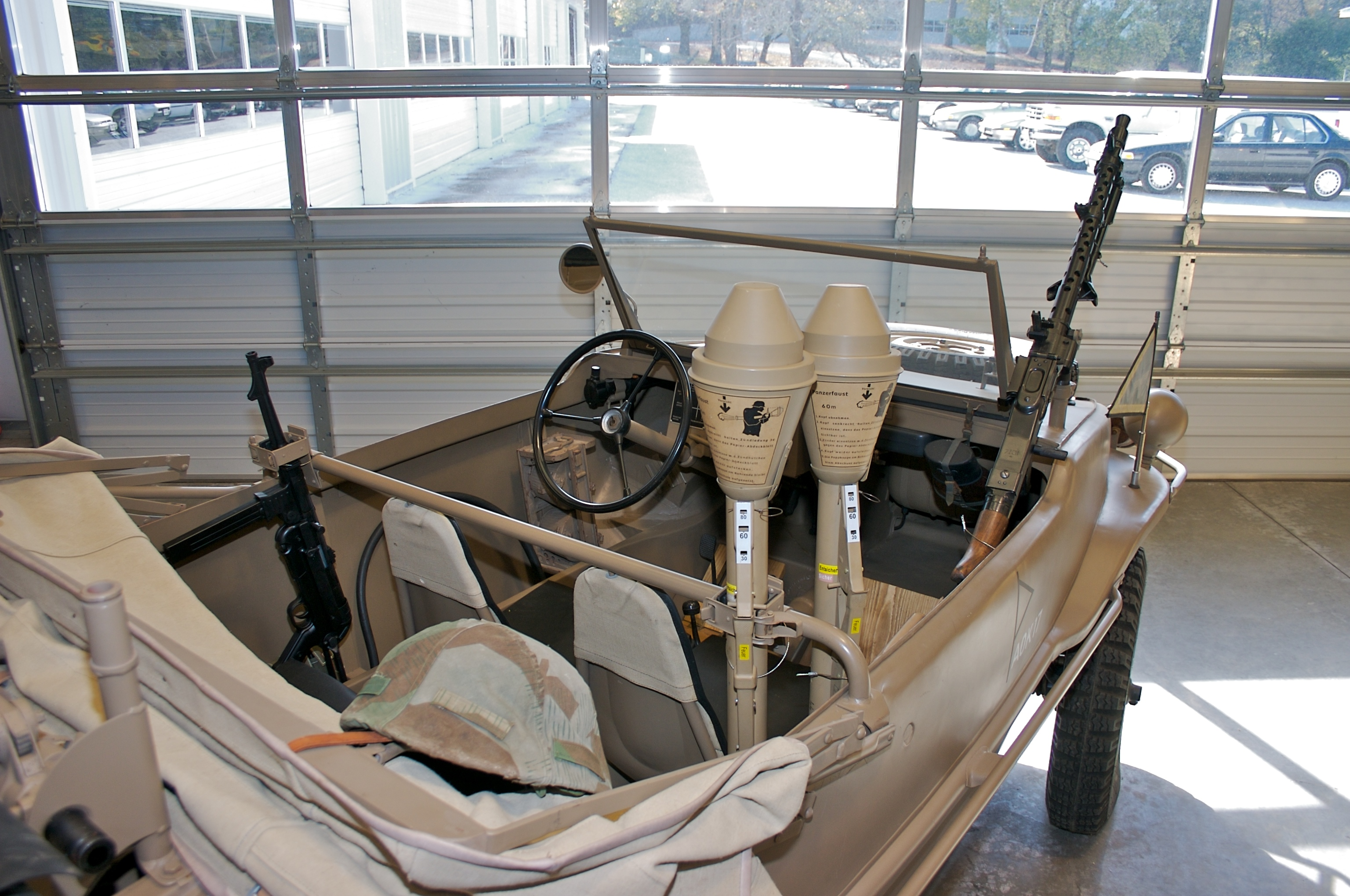
Schwimmwagen of the collection

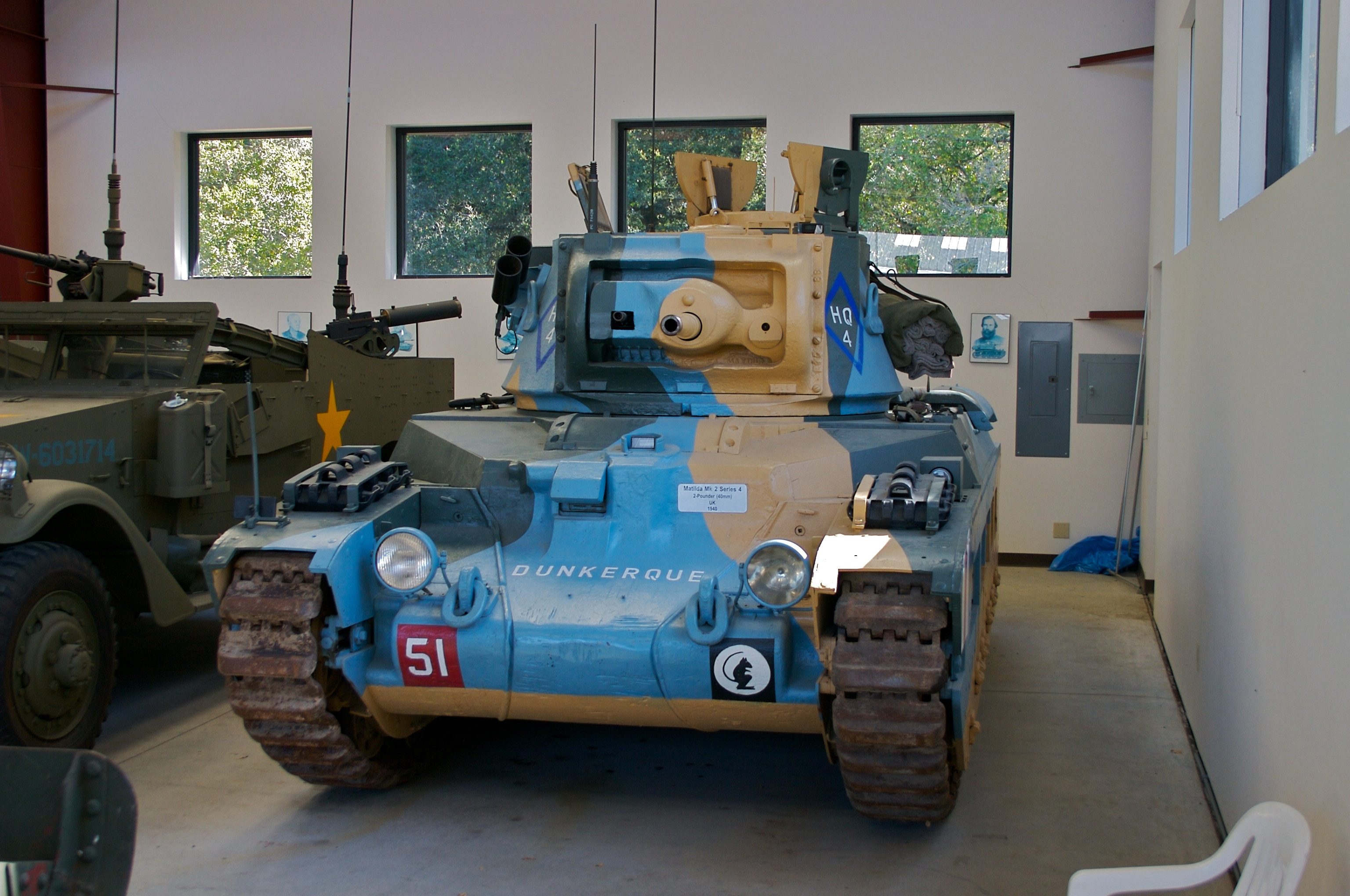
Preserved Matilda tank

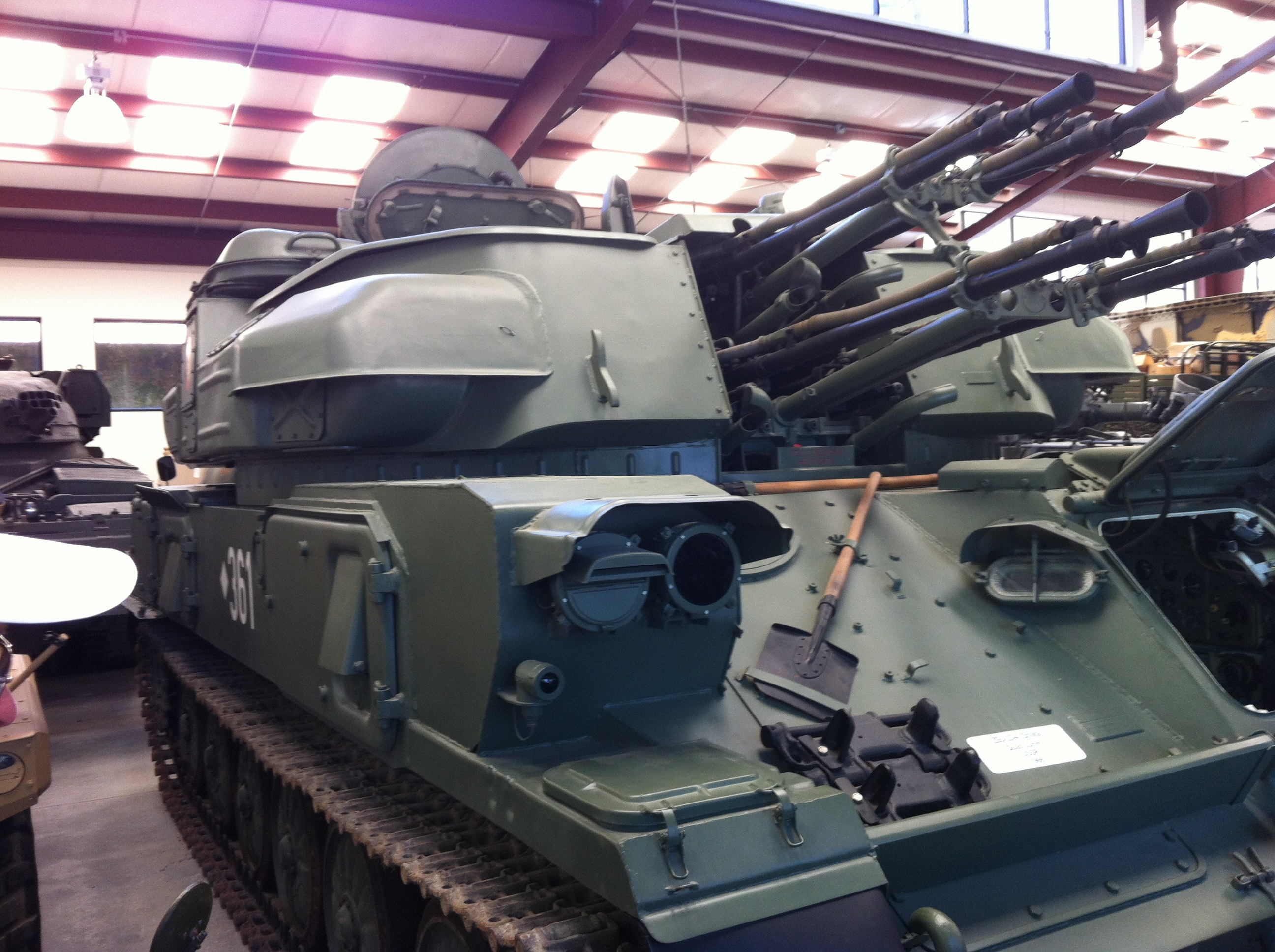
ZSU-23-4 Shilka, 2012
