= Jacques Littlefield =

American collector (1949–2009)

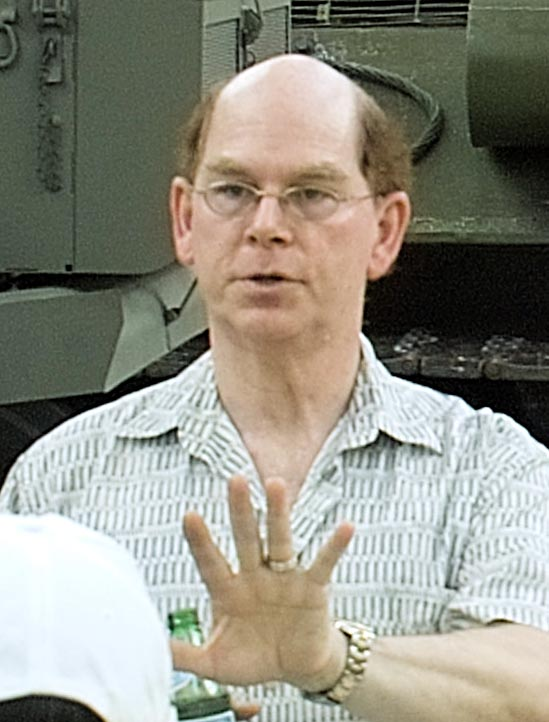
- Born: November 21, 1949; San Francisco, California, U.S.
- Died: January 7, 2009 (aged 59); Portola Valley, California, U.S.
- Occupations: Military vehicle collector, philanthropist, engineer

Jacques Littlefield (November 21, 1949 – January 7, 2009) was the founder of the Military Vehicle Technology Foundation (MVTF), also called the Littlefield collection.

== Collection ==
Jacques Littlefield collected many vintage military vehicles including a Panther tank, several M4 Sherman tanks, a SS-1 Scud launcher, and a propeller of the ship Lusitania. He had over 220 military vehicles to his name.

== Biography ==
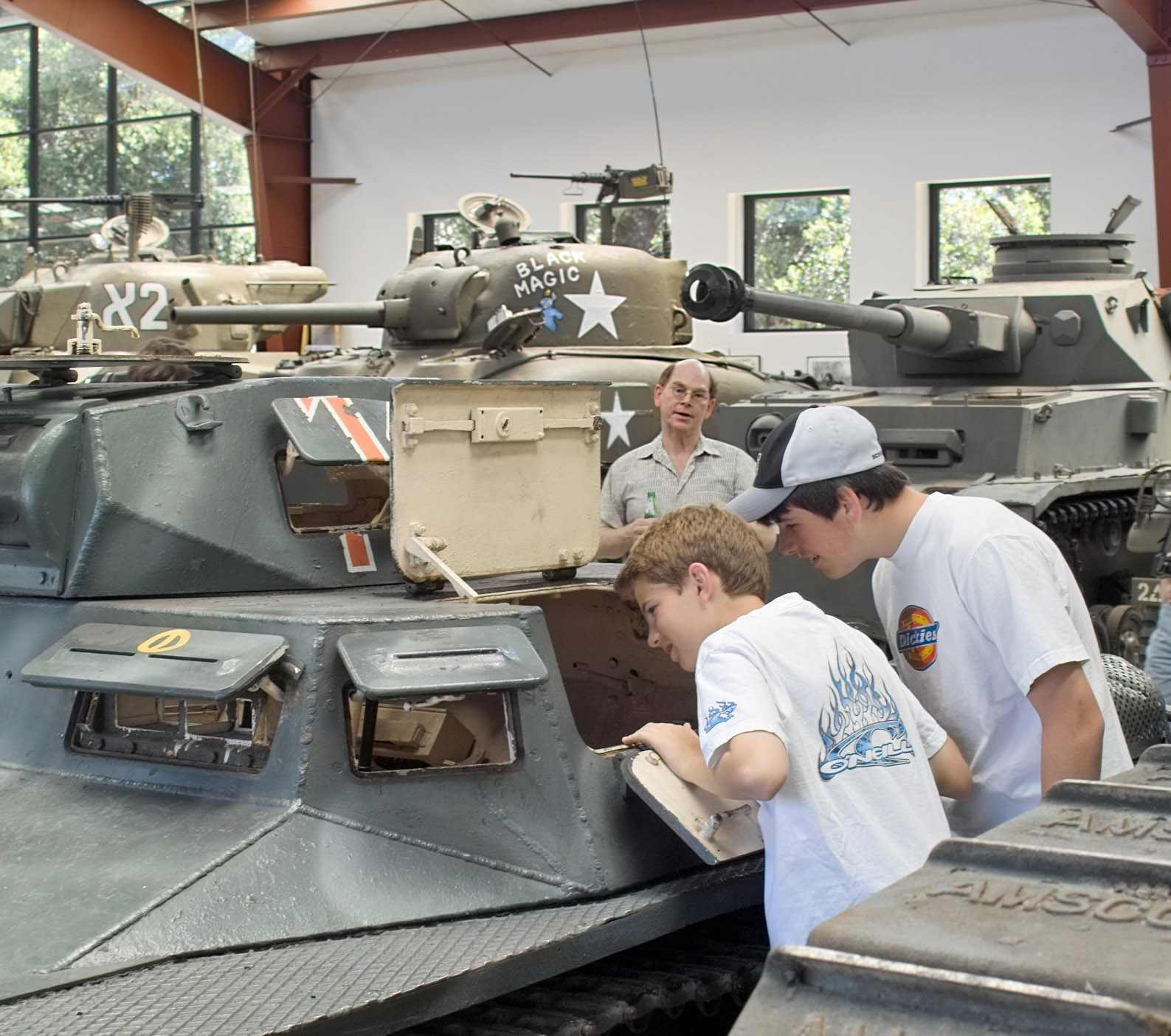
Littlefield shows some of his tanks to visiting students from the Woodside Priory School, May 2004.

Littlefield was born on November 21, 1949, in San Francisco, California. He was the son of Edmund Wattis Littlefield and Jeannik Méquet Littlefield. His father was CEO of Utah Construction Company, his mother is a strong supporter of the arts and a member of the Chairman's Council of the San Francisco Opera.

Littlefield's fascination with military vehicles started as a child, when he started building plastic models of them. In college he built his first remote control scale model tank. He obtained his first full-size military vehicle in 1975, a World War II era M3 Scout Car. In 1998 he set up the Military Vehicle Technology Foundation to manage his collection of over 150 vehicles and restore more.

He grew up in Burlingame and attended Norma Moore Grade School in Burlingame, the Carey School in San Mateo, and the Cate School in Carpinteria before studying at Stanford University, where he received his bachelor's degree in 1971 and an MBA two years later. He worked for Hewlett Packard for five years as a manufacturing engineer before focusing solely on building his museum and restoration facility.

Littlefield served on the boards of the General George Patton Museum, the Cate School, the Coyote Point Museum for Environmental Education, the Hoover Institution, the California Academy of Sciences, and the Filoli Center. He was a member of the Bohemian Club where he was a Captain of the Sempervirens camp.

Following a decade-long battle with colon cancer, Littlefield died on January 7, 2009.

On July 11 and 12, 2014, 160 vehicles of the Littlefield collection were auctioned off to fund the creation of a new museum to display the collection. The American Heritage Museum at the Collings Foundation headquarters in Stow, Massachusetts, had its grand opening in May 2019 and displays over 85 vehicles of the Littlefield collection.
