= American Heritage Museum =

Military history museum in Massachusetts, United States

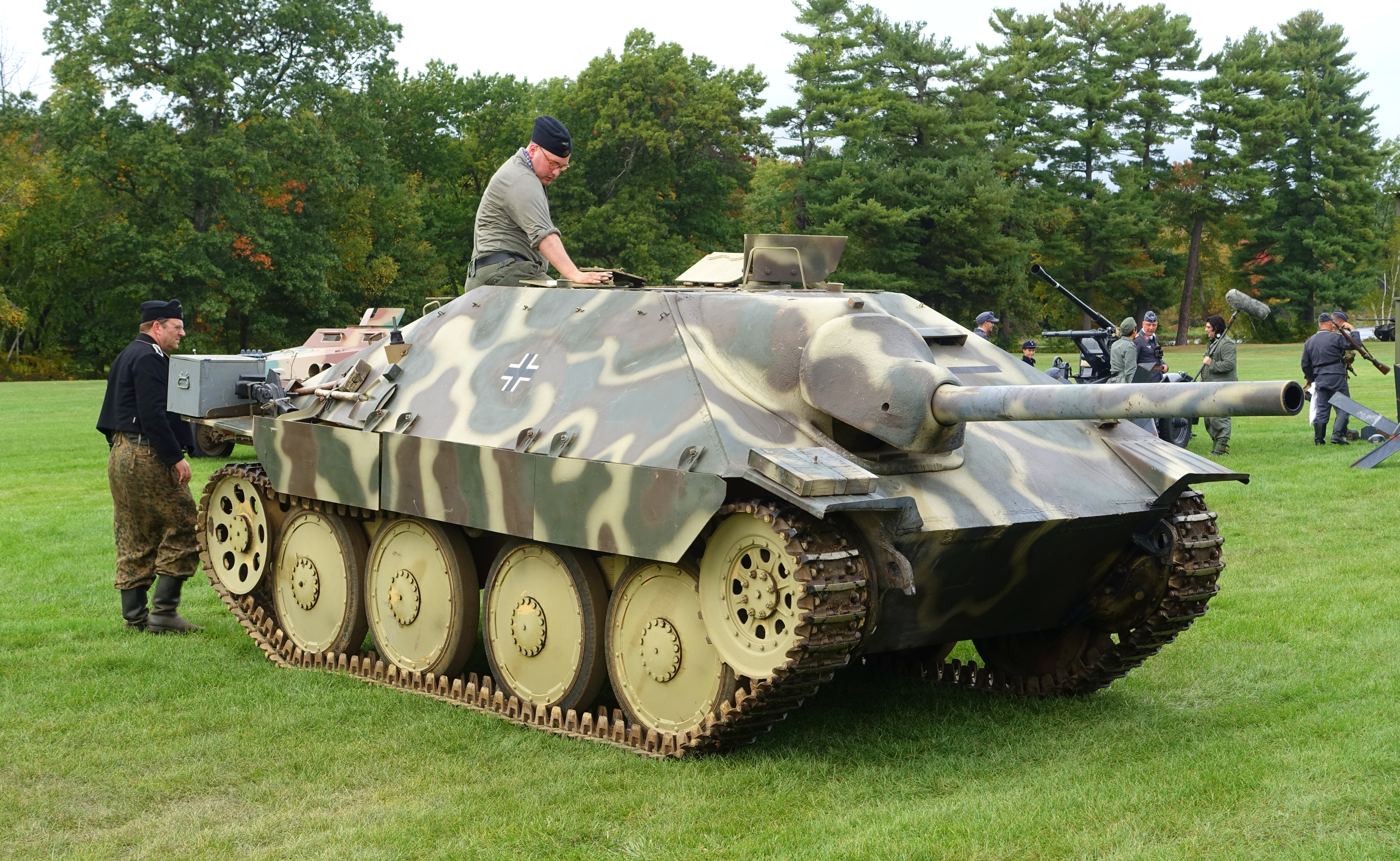
- A Hetzer (German tank destroyer) at the museum

- Location within Massachusetts Location within the United States
- Established: 2018
- Location: Stow, Massachusetts (entrance at 568 Main Street, Hudson, Massachusetts)
- Coordinates: 42°24′03.6″N 71°30′27.7″W
- Type: Military museum
- Executive director: Rob Collings
- Website: www.americanheritagemuseum.org

The American Heritage Museum is a military history museum located on the grounds of the Collings Foundation in the town of Stow, Massachusetts, 21 miles (34 km) west of Boston. The collection consists of over 100 artifacts, most of which were formerly part of the Military Vehicle Technology Foundation collection in Portola Valley, California. Over half of the items on display are from the World War II era, with World War I, the Korean War, Vietnam War, Gulf War, Iraq War, and the war on terror also represented. Most of the items on display, including tanks and artifacts, are American, German, Russian, or British in origin.

== History ==
Beginning in the early 1980s and continuing for the next 20 years, Jacques Littlefield, a Stanford University graduate and former Hewlett Packard engineer, amassed a $30 million collection of military vehicles and engaged in a program of restoring many of them and giving educational tours to the public. By the time of Littlefield's premature death in 2009, his collection had expanded to over 240 vehicles. In accordance with his objective of preserving the collection for the future, the collection was donated to the Collings Foundation, a non-profit educational institution founded in 1979 with a mission dedicated to the preservation and public display of transportation-related history. The Collings Foundation then auctioned off 120 of the vehicles, netting $9.5 million to fund the creation of a new 69,000-square-foot (6,400 m^{2}) museum to display the remaining 80 items in the collection at the Collings Foundation headquarters in the Boston area.

Meanwhile, in August 2015, the Planning Board of the Town of Stow initially rejected the Foundation's application to build the museum, questioning the propriety of locating such a large facility on land that was zoned for residential use. In its defense, the Foundation cited Massachusetts' Dover Amendment, which the Foundation believed would exempt the museum from zoning restrictions, on the grounds that its purpose would be primarily educational in nature. Ultimately, an agreement was reached between the two parties in July 2017, and construction of the museum was completed in 2018. The museum held a preview opening in October 2018 and had its grand opening in May 2019.

== Exhibits ==
Visitors are encouraged to begin their tour with the viewing of a brief introductory film, followed by the immersive walk-through of the "WWI Trench Experience" room, containing a recreation of Western Front trenches at the Battle of Saint-Mihiel, the first and only offensive launched solely by the United States Army in World War I. Visitors next enter the "War Clouds" room, which is a short movie which covers the Interwar period and the rise of Nazi Germany. Visitors then exit to the main display room of the museum, in which artifacts are arranged roughly chronologically and grouped under major campaigns and theaters of war.

The museum also includes a section of the Berlin Wall, and a September 11 memorial featuring a twisted steel beam from one of the World Trade Center towers. The steel beam was dedicated in a ceremony at the museum on September 11, 2018.

The museum opened an exhibit in 2023 about the Hanoi Hilton using materials salvaged from the original building,

In January 2024 a restored WWII-era Deutsche Reichsbahn rail car was dedicated in a solemn ceremony at the Museum, to become part of a growing exhibit on the Holocaust. This cattle car is of the type used to transport millions of Jewish and other persecuted groups to concentration and extermination camps between 1933 and 1945. In 2025 the museum opened a Holocaust Virtual Reality Experience called " A Promise Kept" with the founder of the Illinois Holocaust Museum and Auschwitz survivor Fritzie Fritzshall.

The museum has also recently acquired a replica Mitsubishi A6M Zero used in the movie "Tora Tora Tora".

== Collection ==
Some of the major artifacts currently on display are as follows:

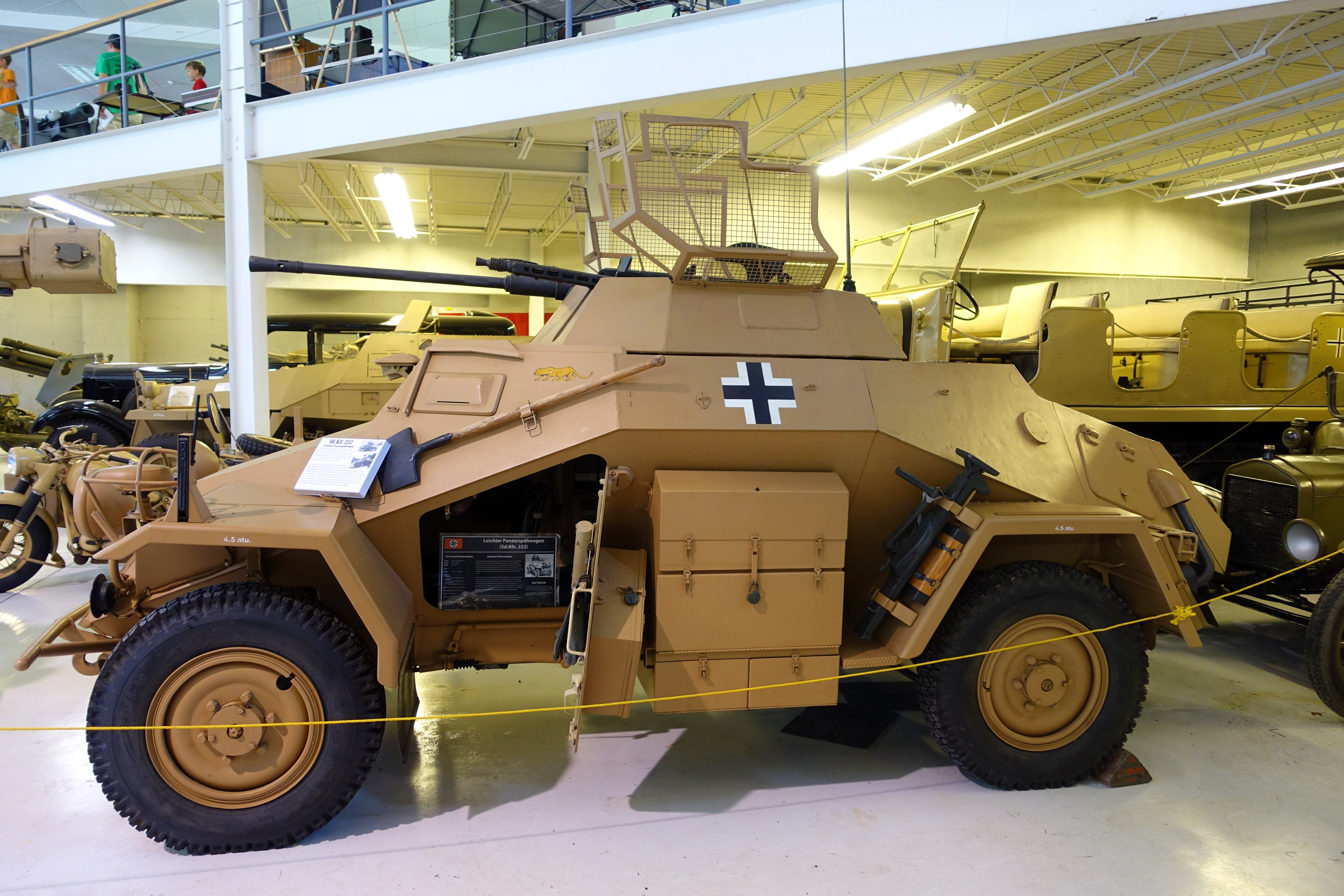
Leichter Panzerspähwagen SdKfz 222 German armored scout car

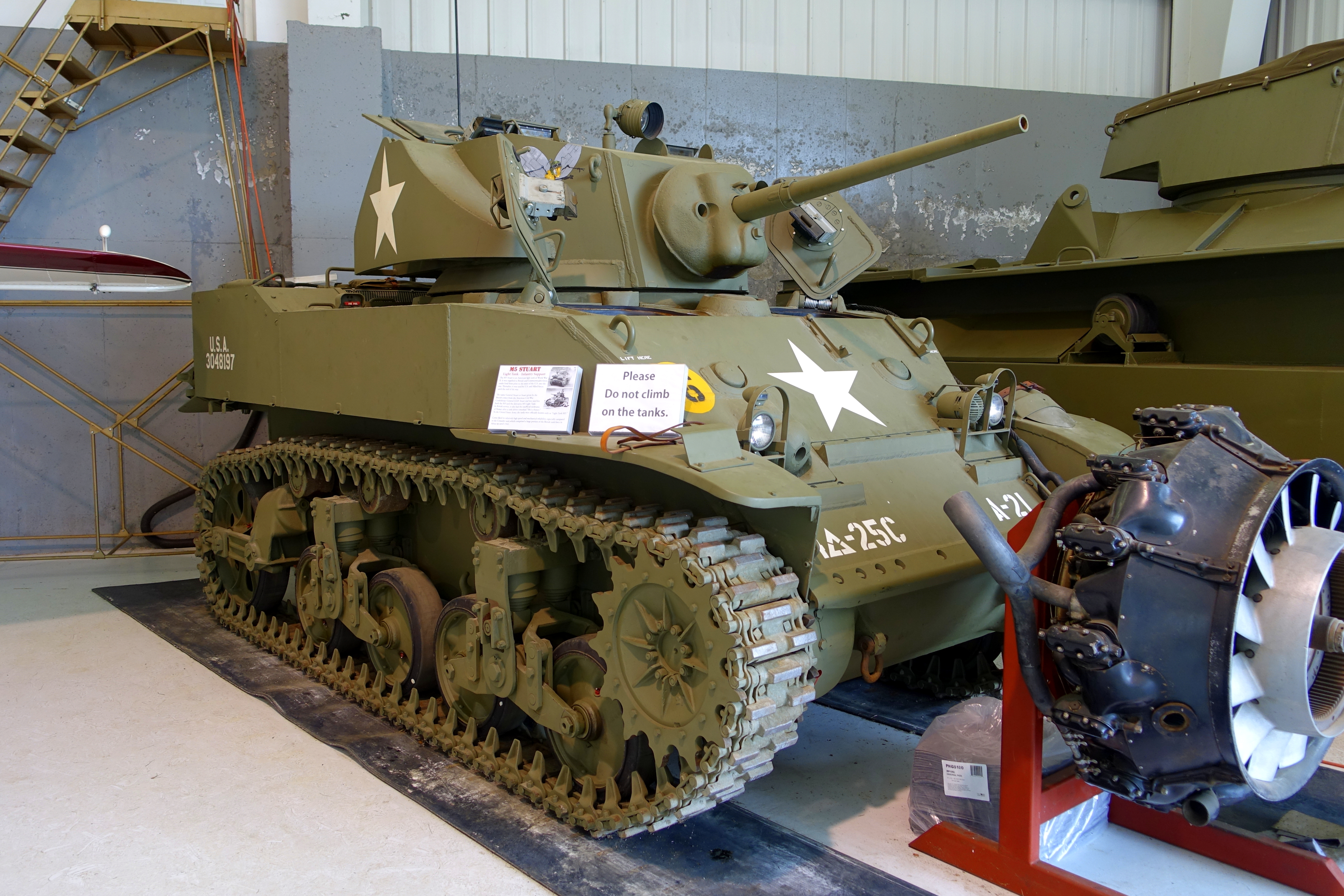
M5A1 Stuart VI light tank

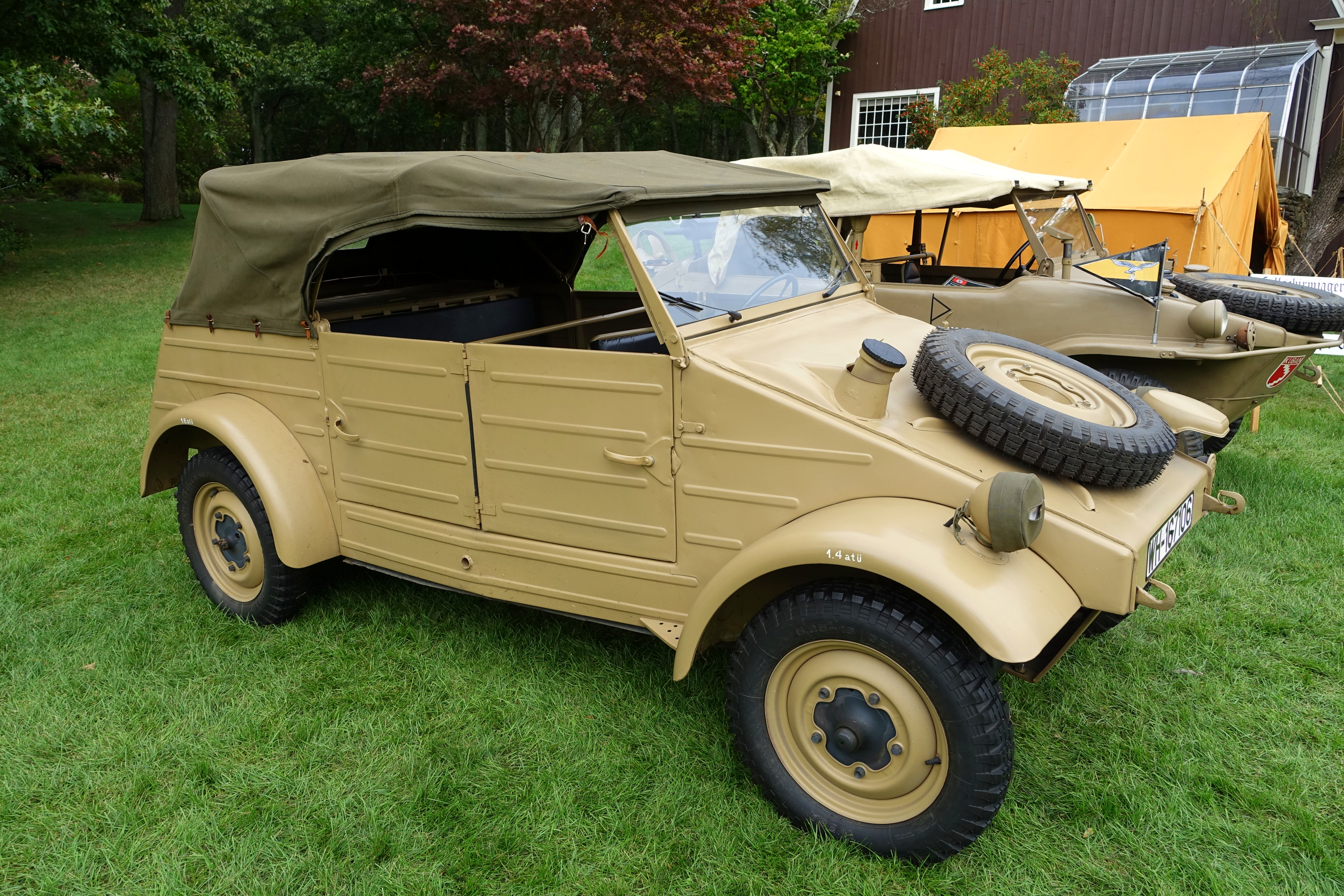
Volkswagen Kübelwagen Type 82 German reconnaissance car

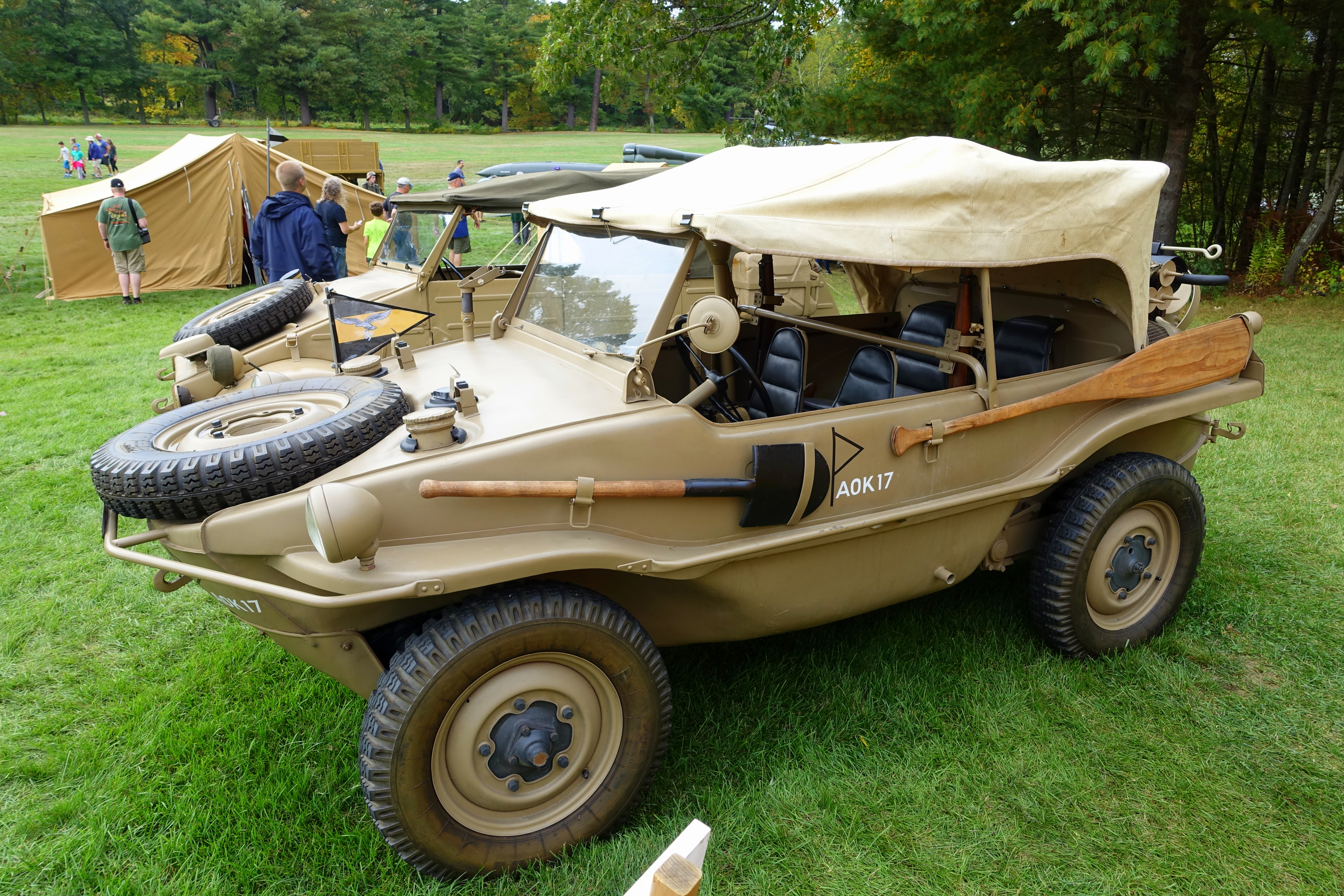
Volkswagen Schwimmwagen Type 166 German amphibious personnel carrier

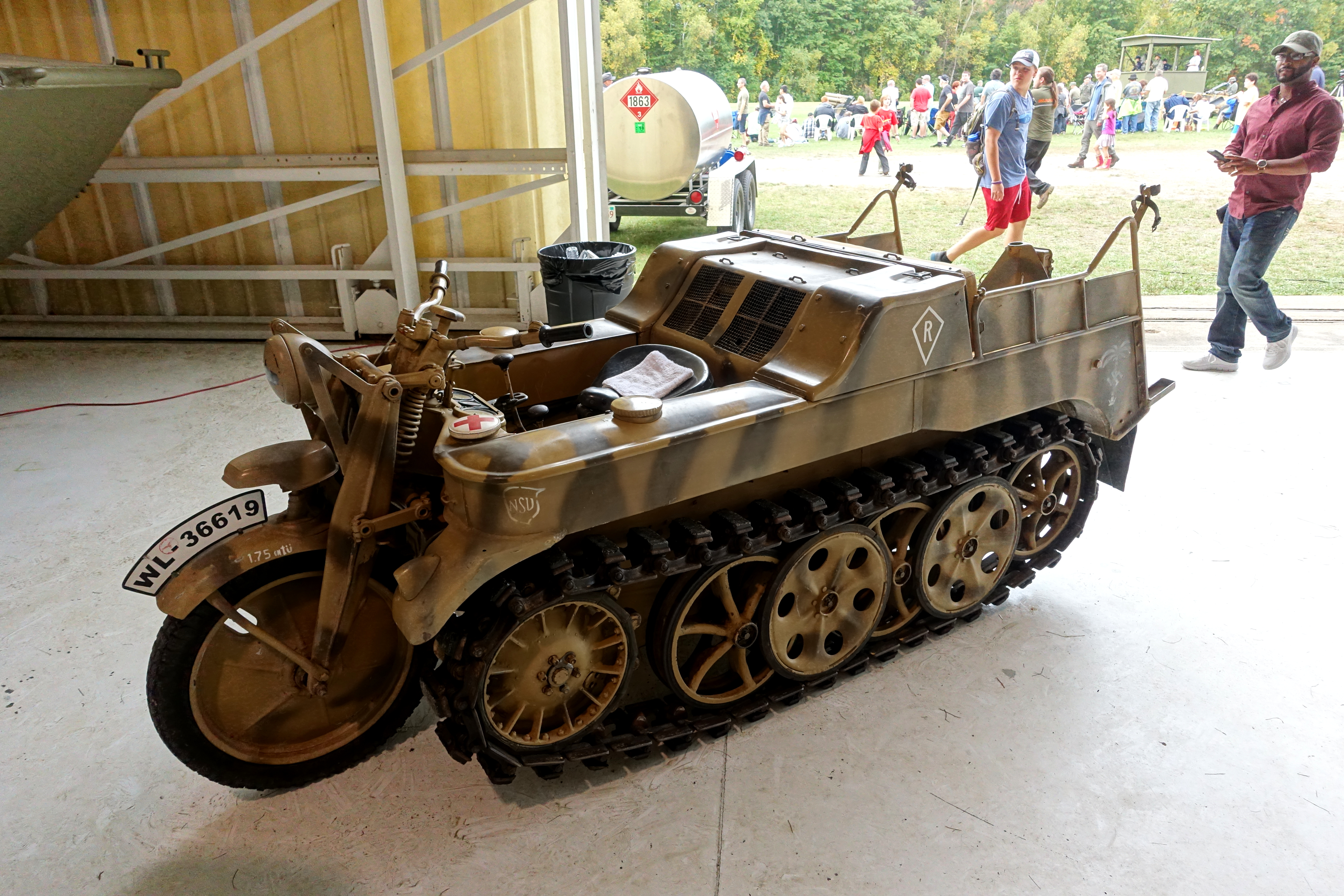
Sd.Kfz. 2 Kleines Kettenkrad German personnel carrier

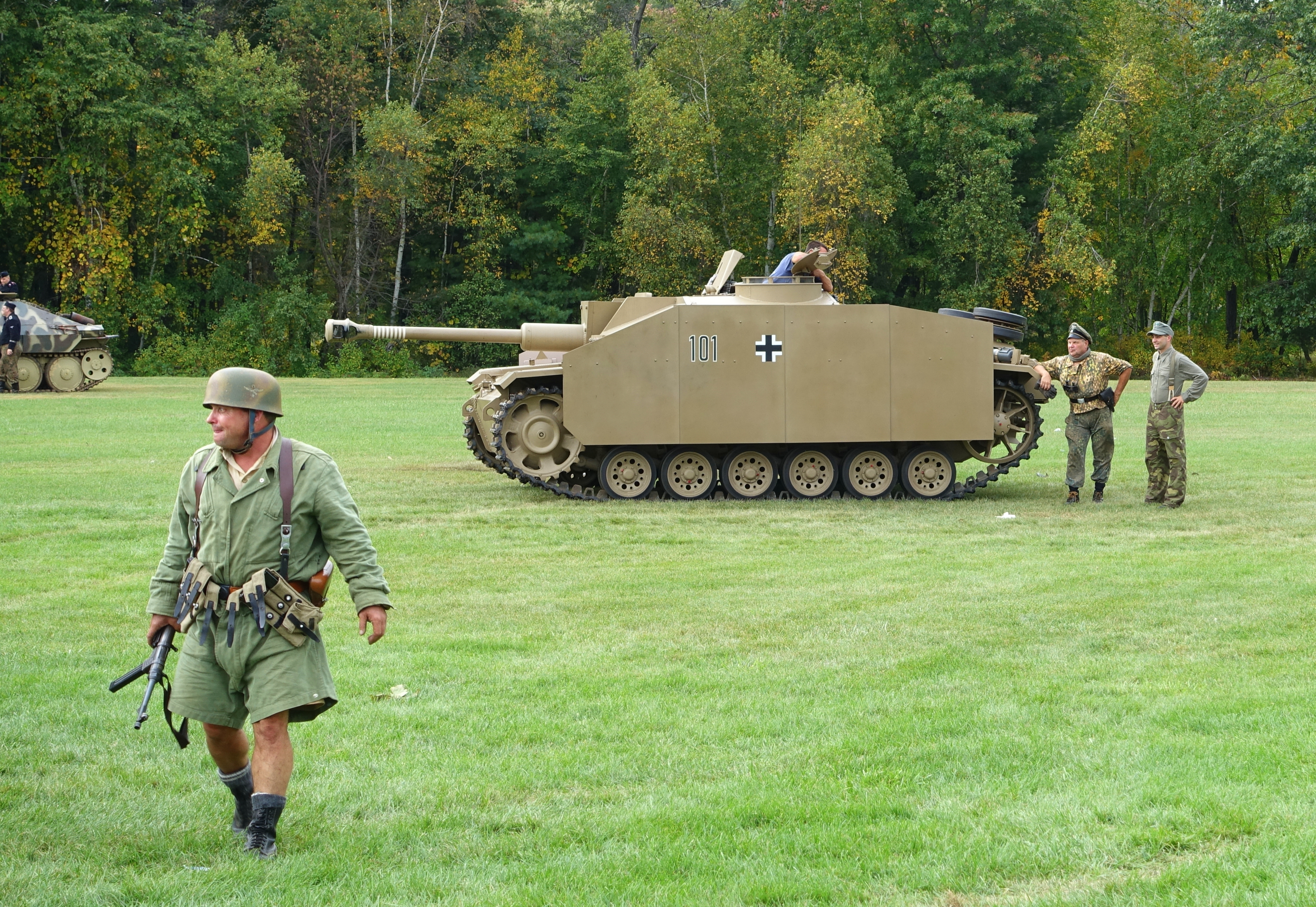
StuG III Ausf. G Self Propelled Artillery

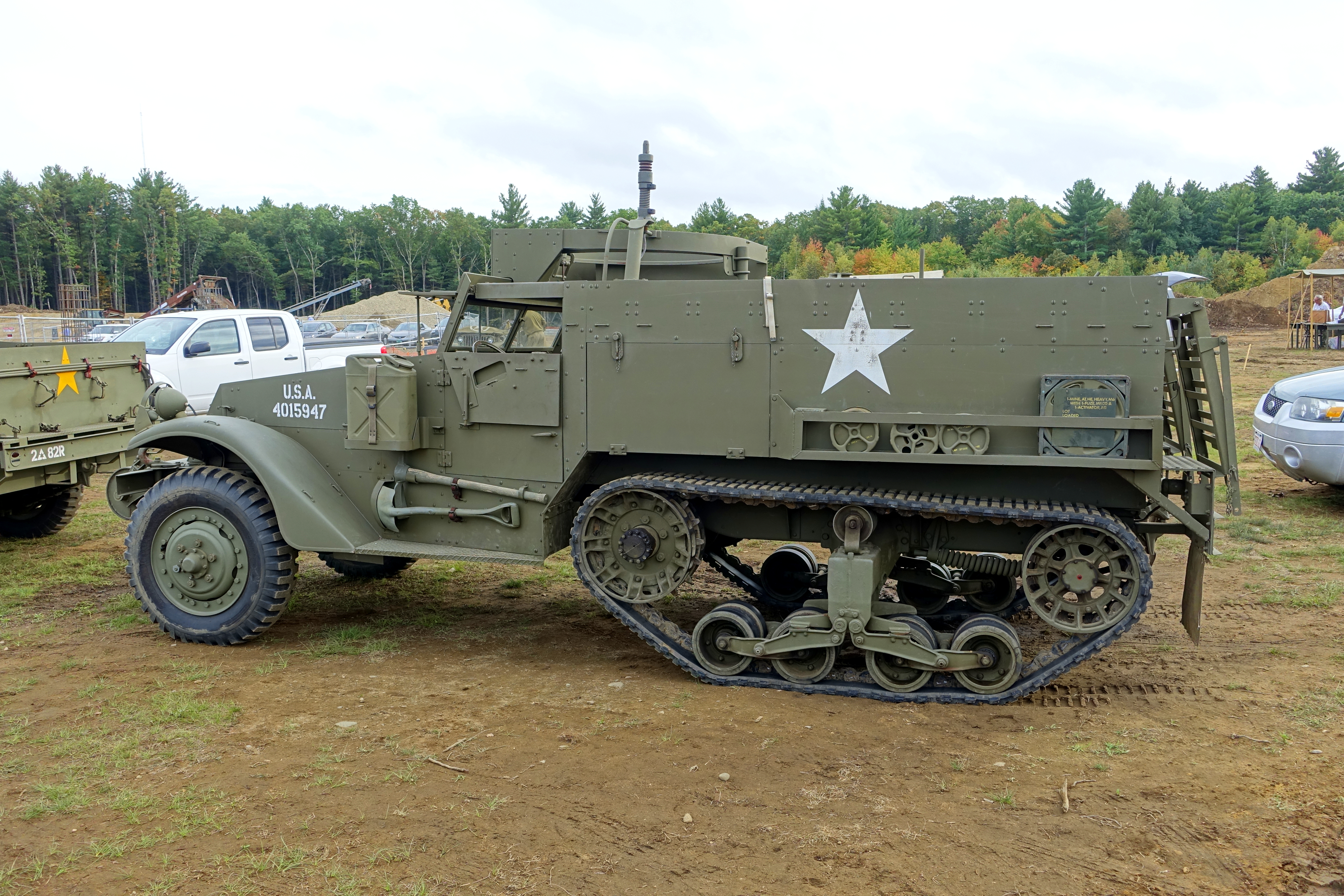
M16 Half Track personnel carrier

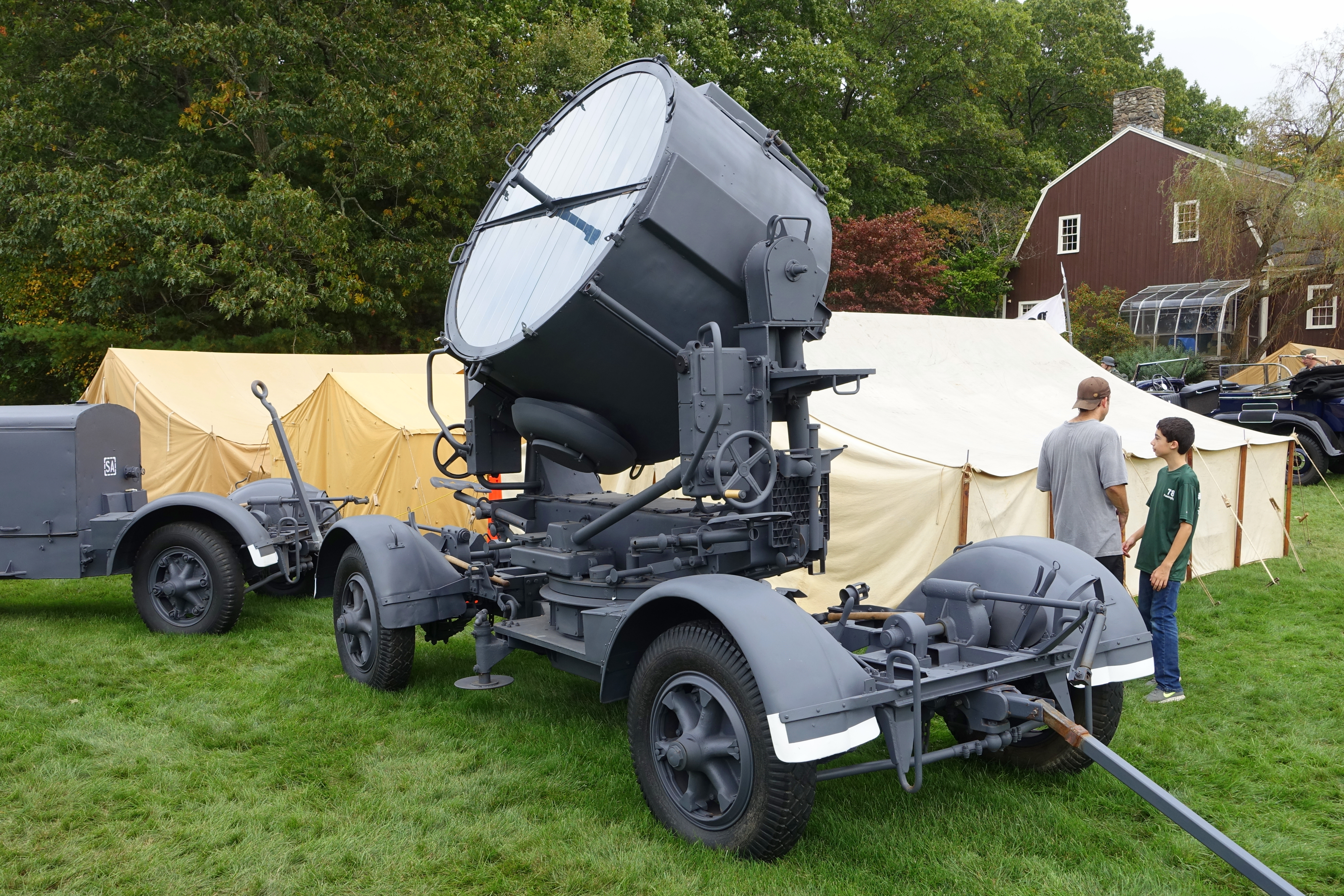
150cm Flakscheinwerfer German anti-aircraft searchlight

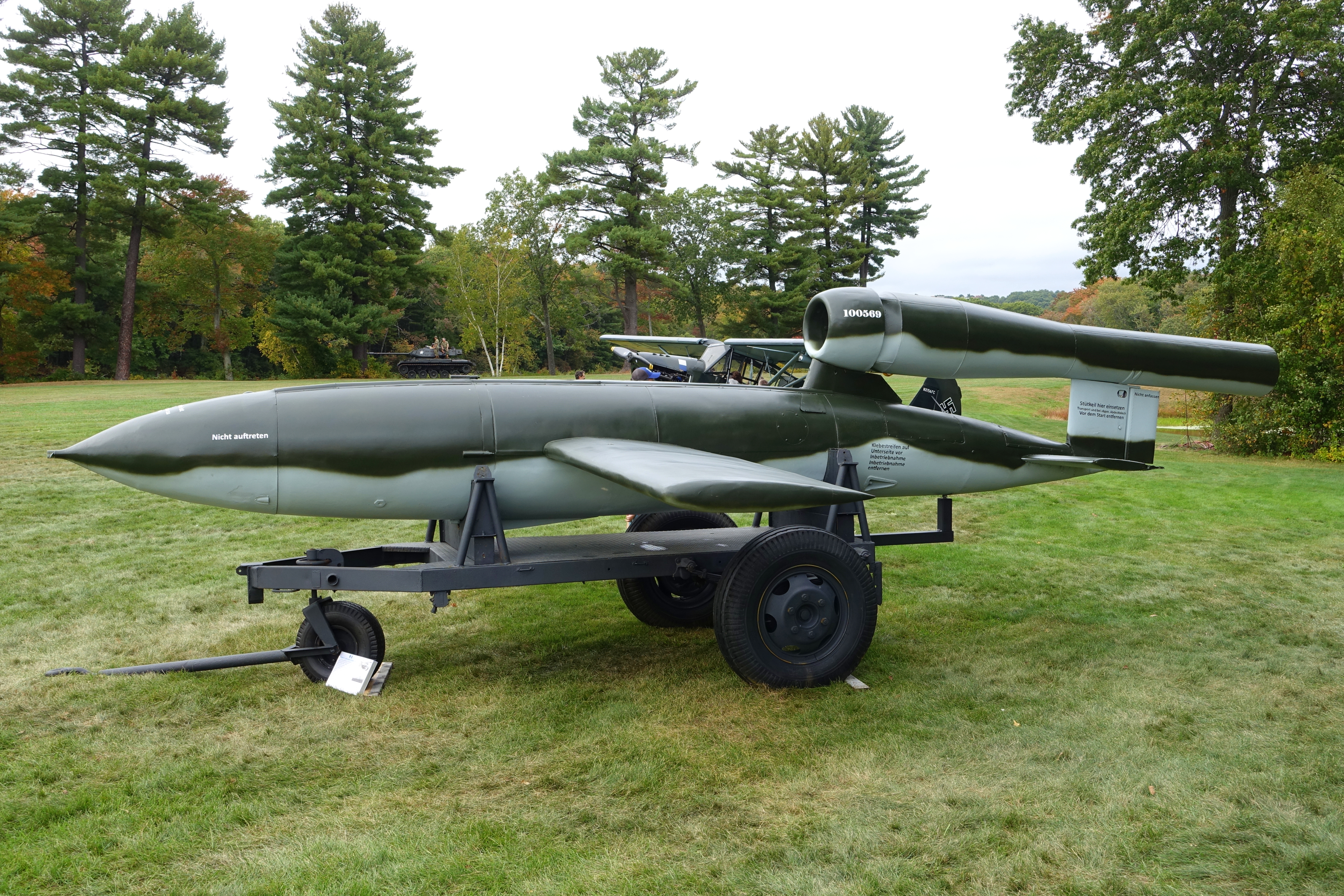
V-1 Flying Bomb (JB-2 Loon)

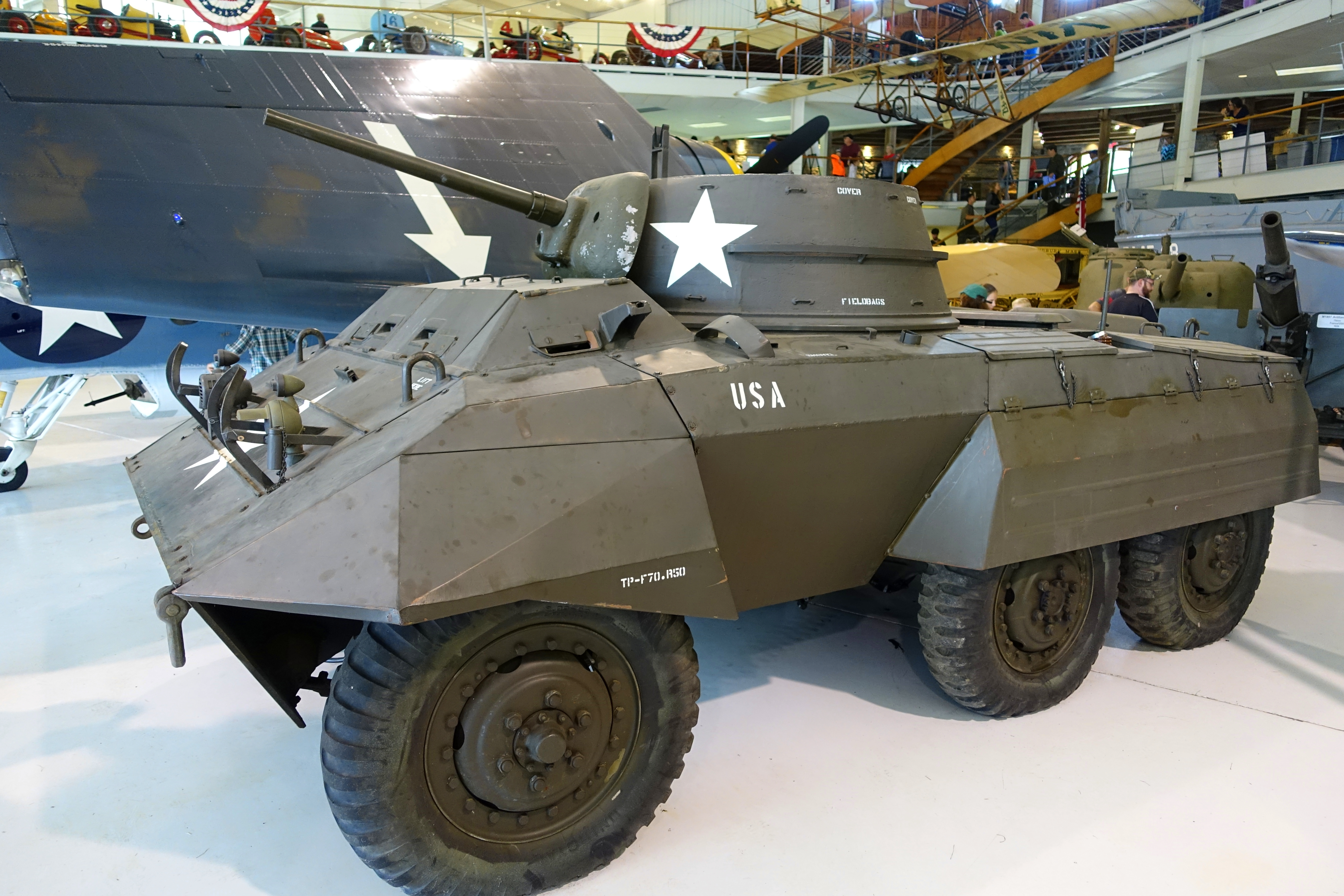
M8 Greyhound armored car

Artifact	Type	Country of origin	Campaign/theater	Notes
1795 6-pounder gun	cannon	UK	Lobby	
17 cm mittlerer Minenwerfer	mortar	German Empire	Lobby	
QF 1-pounder pom-pom	autocannon	UK	Lobby	
1917 Ford Model T ambulance	vehicle	USA	WWI Trench Experience	
M1917	light tank	USA	WWI Trench Experience	
Panzer I. A	tank	Nazi Germany	War Clouds	
Vickers Mk. IV	light tank	UK	War Clouds	
Mercedes G4	staff car	Nazi Germany	War Clouds	
25 mm Hotchkiss	Anti-tank gun	France	War Clouds	
7.5 cm leichtes Infanteriegeschütz 18	Infantry support gun	Nazi Germany	War Clouds	
1942 Buick Roadmaster	vehicle	USA	Arsenal of Democracy	
M4A1 Sherman (Grizzly I)	tank	USA	Arsenal of Democracy	
Sherman	turret trainer	USA	Arsenal of Democracy	
M3 Lee	medium tank	USA	North Africa	
Matilda MK.II	tank	UK	North Africa	
Sd.Kfz. 10 1-Ton	personnel carrier/prime mover	Nazi Germany	North Africa	
Leichter Panzerspähwagen Sd.Kfz. 222	armored scout car	Nazi Germany	North Africa	
7.5 cm Pak 40	anti-tank gun	Nazi Germany	North Africa	
M3A1	scout car	USA	Italian Campaign	
M5A1 Stuart VI	light tank	USA	Italian Campaign	
VW Kübelwagen Type 82	reconnaissance car	Nazi Germany	Italian Campaign	
VW Schwimmwagen Type 166	amphibious personnel carrier	Nazi Germany	Italian Campaign	
Col. John Riley Kane's Medal of Honor	medal	USA	Italian Campaign	
T-34/76	tank	Soviet Union	Eastern Front	
Sd.Kfz. 251/1 Ausf. D	half-track armored personnel carrier	Nazi Germany	Eastern Front	
Sd.Kfz. 2 Kleines Kettenkrad	half-track personnel carrier	Nazi Germany	Eastern Front	
Sturmgeschütz III Ausf. G	tank destroyer	Nazi Germany	Eastern Front	
Borgward IV	demolition vehicle	Nazi Germany	Eastern Front	
T-34/85	tank	Soviet Union	Clash of Steel	
Panzer V "Panther" Ausf. A	tank	Nazi Germany	Clash of Steel	
LCVP “Higgins Boat”	landing craft	USA	D-Day	
Churchill Crocodile	flame thrower tank	UK	D-Day	
Cromwell I	tank	UK	D-Day	
Jagdpanzer 38 Hetzer	tank destroyer	Nazi Germany	Battle of the Bulge	
M4A3E2 Sherman “Jumbo”	tank	USA	Battle of the Bulge	
M16 Half Track	multiple gun motor carriage	USA	Battle of the Bulge	
M22 Locust	airborne tank	USA	Crossing the Rhine	
M18 Hellcat	tank destroyer	USA	Crossing the Rhine	
A34 Comet	cruiser tank	UK	Crossing the Rhine	
Type VII U-boat conning tower	submarine	Nazi Germany	Battle for Berlin	Rear section of tower
IS-2	tank	Soviet Union	Battle for Berlin	
SU-100	tank destroyer	Soviet Union	Battle for Berlin	
Messerschmitt Bf 109 G-14	fighter aircraft	Nazi Germany	Battle for Berlin	
Sd.Kfz. 8 12 ton	personnel carrier/prime mover	Nazi Germany	Defense of the Reich	
8.8 cm Flak 36	anti-aircraft artillery gun	Nazi Germany	Defense of the Reich	
Kommandogerät 40	anti-aircraft battery rangefinder computer	Nazi Germany	Defense of the Reich	
150cm Flakscheinwerfer	anti-aircraft battery searchlight	Nazi Germany	Defense of the Reich	
JB-2 Loon (in V-1 paint scheme)	flying bomb	Nazi Germany	Defense of the Reich	
M8 Greyhound	armored car	USA	Liberation	
Grumman F6F-3N Hellcat	aircraft	USA	Pacific War	
LVT(A)-4	landing vehicle	USA	Pacific War	
M4A3 Sherman	tank	USA	Pacific War	
M29C Weasel	personnel carrier	USA	Pacific War	
P-40B Tomahawk	fighter aircraft	USA	Pacific War	
Daimler Dingo Mk1	armored personnel carrier	UK	Pacific War	
Type 4 Ho-Ro	self-propelled gun	Japan	Pacific War	
M7 Priest	self-propelled howitzer	USA	Korean War	
M26A1 Pershing	tank	USA	Korean War	
M24 Chaffee	light tank	USA	Korean War	
M39	armored utility vehicle	USA	Korean War	
M2A1	half track scout vehicle	USA	Korean War	
M4A3E8 76W HVSS Sherman	tank	USA	Korean War	
Ford GPW Jeep	vehicle	USA	Korean War	
M41 Walker Bulldog	light tank	USA	Vietnam War	
M48 Patton	tank	USA	Vietnam War	
PT-76	amphibious tank	Soviet Union	Vietnam War	
T-72G	tank	Soviet Union	Cold War	
M551 Sheridan	amphibious tank	USA	Gulf War	
M60A1	tank	USA	Gulf War	
T-55	tank	Iraq	Gulf War	
ZSU-23-4M Shilka	Self-Propelled Anti-Aircraft Gun	Soviet Union	Gulf War	
MAZ-7310	missile launcher	Iraq	Gulf War	
Scud-B	missile	Iraq	Gulf War	
2S1 Gvozdika	self-propelled howitzer	Iraq	Gulf War	
M1A1 Abrams	tank	USA	War on Terrorism	This is the M1A1 commanded by US Marine Sgt George M. Ulloa, which on August 2, 2006 was hit by two IED's in Al Anbar Province, fatally injuring Sgt Ulloa.
QinetiQ TALON	tracked robot	USA	War on Terrorism	
iRobot PackBot	tracked robot	USA	War on Terrorism	

== See also ==
Tank museums

- The Tank Museum – England
- Imperial War Museum – England
- Kubinka Tank Museum – Russia
- Musée des Blindés – France
- Military museum Lešany – Czech Republic
- Deutsches Panzermuseum – Germany
- Yad La-Shiryon – Latrun, Israel
- Parola Tank Museum – Finland
- Australian Armour and Artillery Museum – Australia
- Nationaal Militair Museum – Soesterberg, The Netherlands
- Royal Tank Museum – Amman, Jordan
- Base Borden Military Museum - Canada

American military museums

- National Museum of the United States Army - Ft. Belvoir, VA
- The International Museum of World War II – Natick, Massachusetts (closed)
- National Museum of the Pacific War – Fredericksburg, Texas
- National World War I Museum and Memorial – Kansas City, Missouri
- The National WWII Museum – New Orleans, Louisiana
- National Museum of the Marine Corps - Triangle, Virginia
- Heartland Museum of Military Vehicles – Lexington, Nebraska

Other resources

- Lists of armoured fighting vehicles
- List of military vehicles of World War II
- Tank classification
