= Mercedes-Benz W31 =

Mercedes-Benz W31 type G4
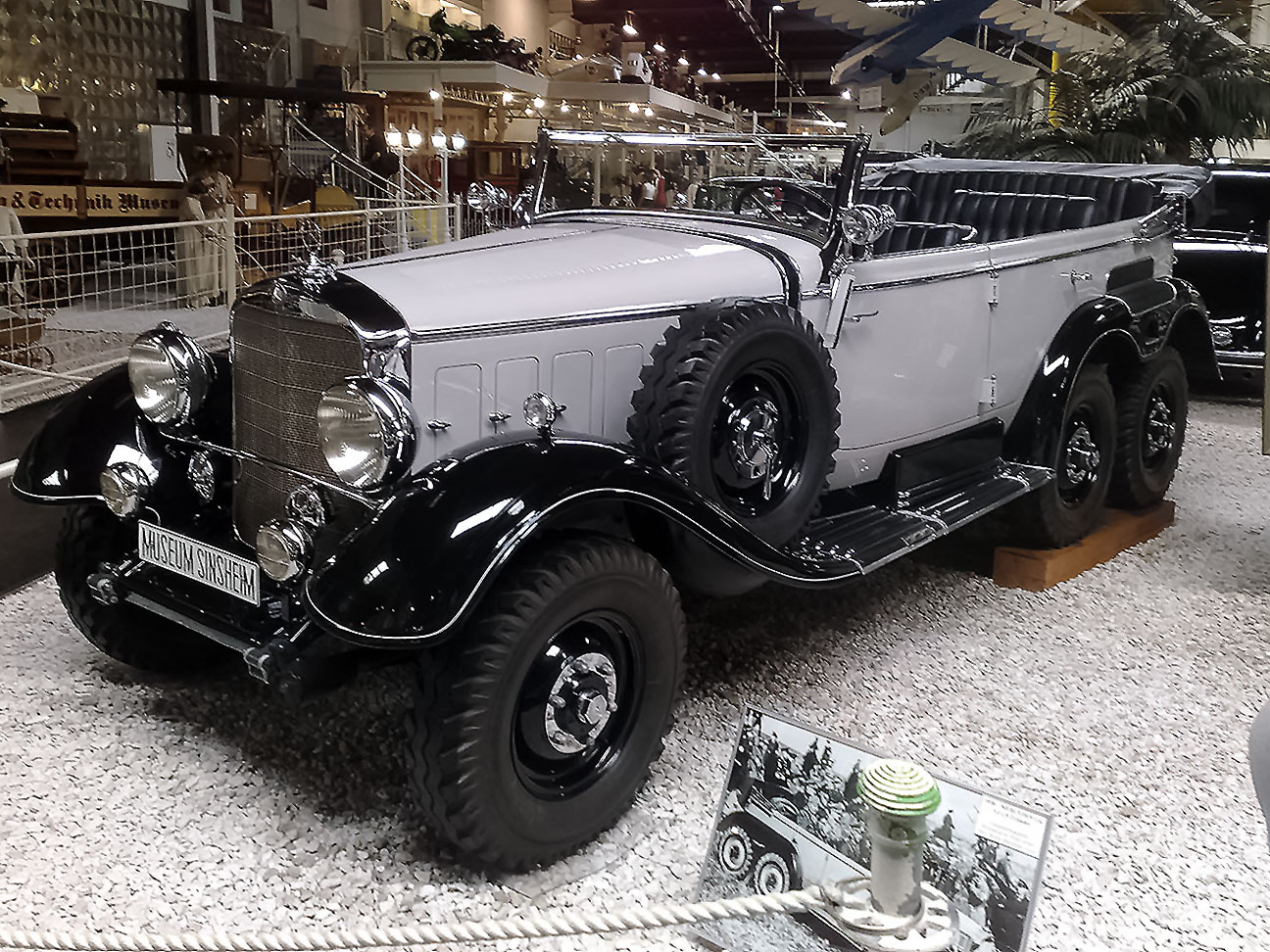
- A G4 on display at the Sinsheim Auto & Technik Museum, 2008

Overview
- Manufacturer: Mercedes-Benz
- Production: 1934–1939; 57 produced
- Assembly: Germany

Body and chassis
- Class: Off-road vehicle
- Body style: 4-door touring car; Limousine

Powertrain
- Engine: 5.0L M24 I8 (1934–1936); 5.3L M24 I8 (1937); 5.4L M24-II I8 (1938–1939)
- Transmission: 4-speed manual

Dimensions
- Wheelbase: 4,050 mm (159 in)
- Length: 5,920 mm (233 in)
- Width: 1,870 mm (74 in)
- Height: 1,900 mm (75 in)
- Curb weight: 3,700 kg (8,157 lb)

Chronology
- Predecessor: Mercedes-Benz G1 (W103)
- Successor: Mercedes-AMG G 63 6x6

The Mercedes-Benz W31 type G4 is a German three-axle off-road vehicle first produced by Mercedes-Benz as a staff/command car for the Wehrmacht in 1934. The cars were designed as a seven-seat touring car or closed saloon, and were mainly used by upper echelons of the Nazi regime in parades and inspections, as they were deemed too expensive for general Army use.

== History ==
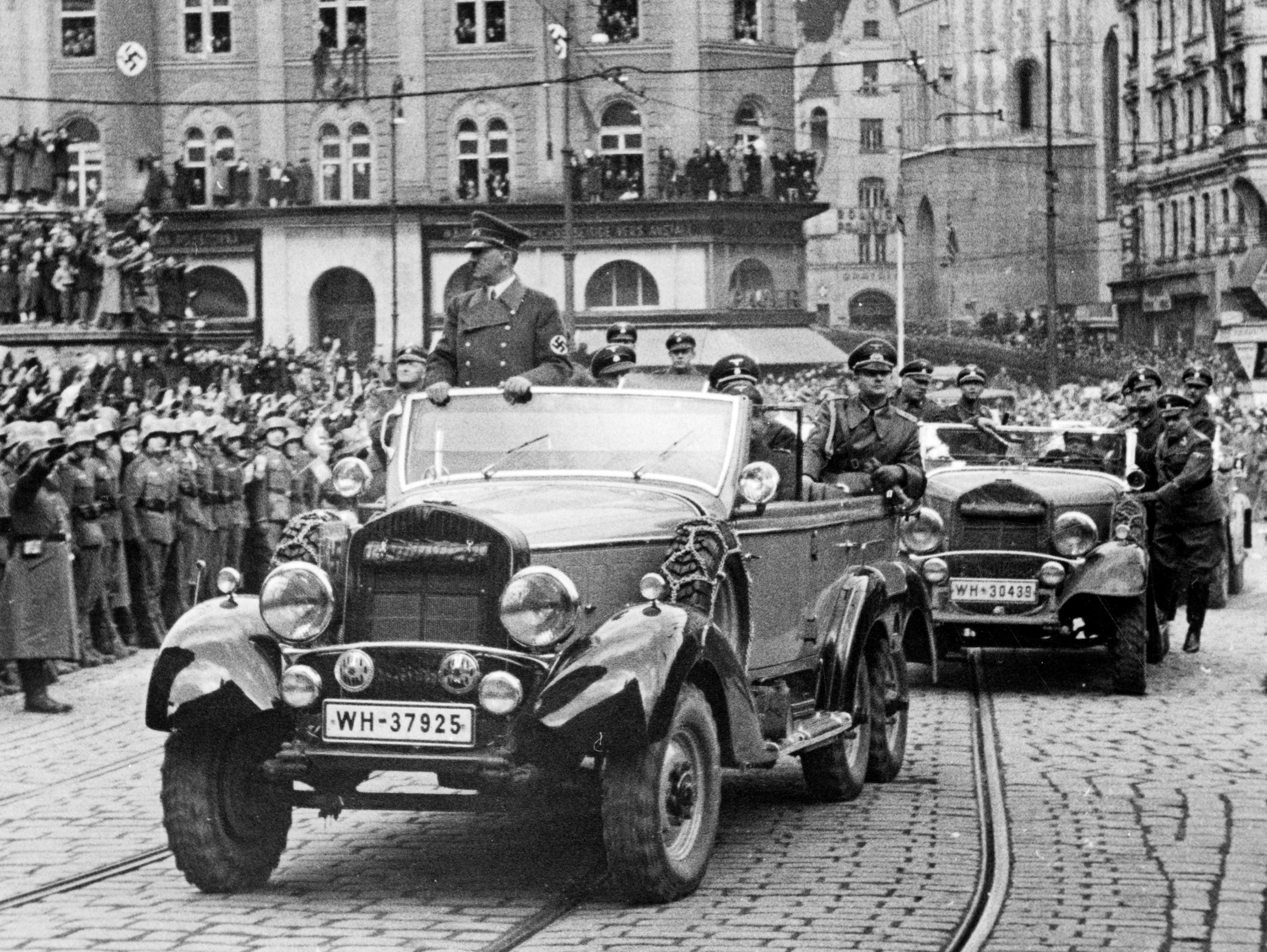
Adolf Hitler in G4 at his visit to Brno, 17 March 1939

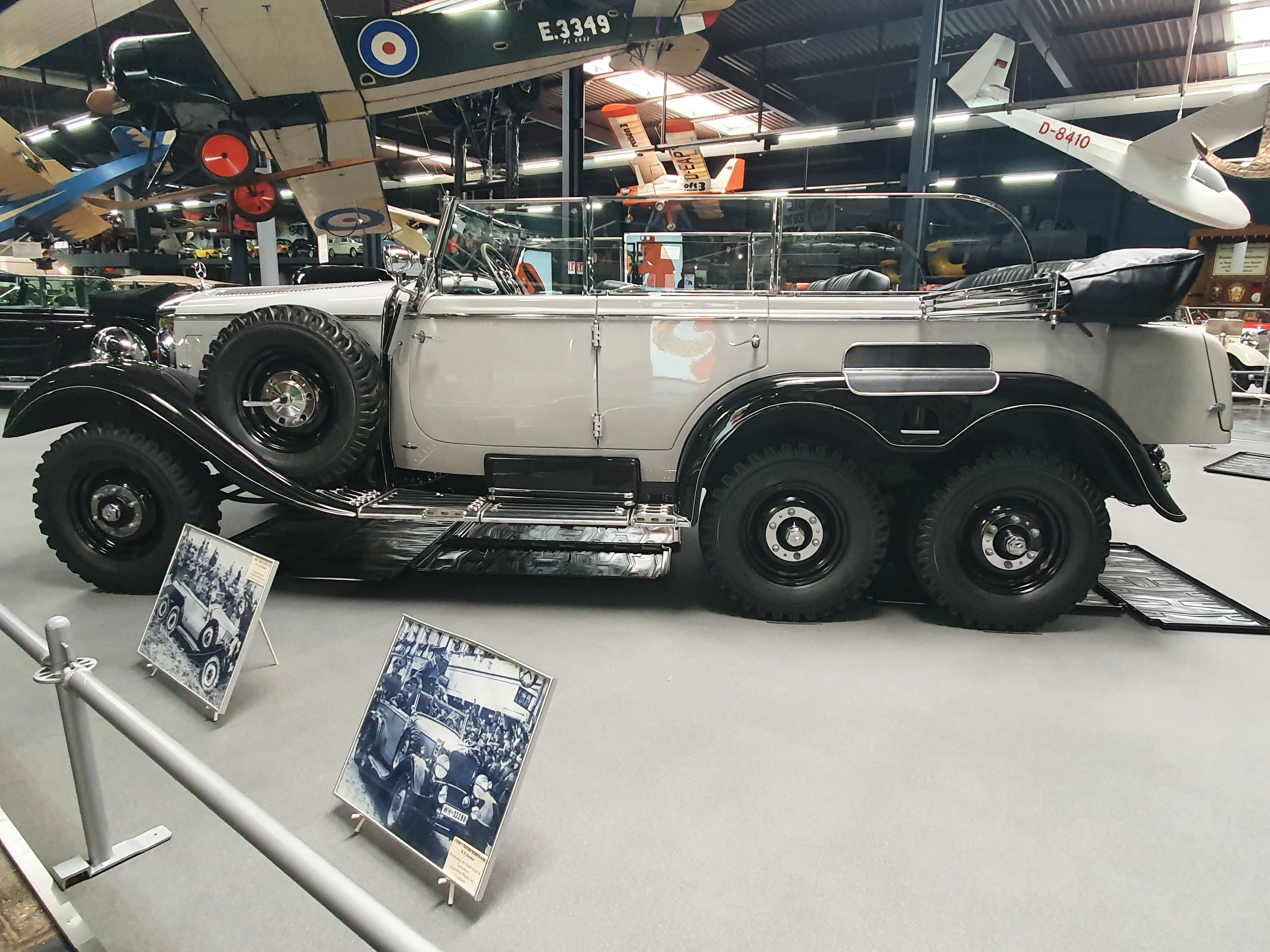
Mercedes Benz G-4 (1938) side view

The G4 was a development of the G1, launched in 1926. All had an 8-cylinder inline engine, in the first three years of 5018 cc (306.2 cu in) displacement delivering 100 PS (74 kW). It was a 6×4 configuration with four-speed transmission (synchronised upper gears) that transferred drive to all four rear wheels via self-locking differentials, the front wheels did not drive. The rear wheels were attached to two rigid axles 950 millimetres (37 in) apart, which were suspended in joint semi-elliptic leaf springs. The front axle was rigid with semi-elliptic springs. All six wheels had hydraulic brakes with servo assistance. The top speed was only 67 km/h (42 mph), limited by the type of all-terrain tyres. Only 11 of these vehicles were delivered to the Wehrmacht. The car used an elongated box-section frame that allowed for generous interior room. Comfortable seating for up to seven was provided by benches (front and rear) and one middle row of two with separate arm rests. The vehicles were first delivered to the SS for use by Hitler and his adjutants painted with gloss gray bodies over gloss black fenders and running boards but, by the end of the war, they had all received anti-reflective matte and/or camouflage finishes in accordance with their military purpose. Many G4 vehicles belonging to the highest-ranking party members also featured rear-facing spotlights to be used to temporarily blind unauthorized drivers who followed too closely.

From 1937 a more powerful engine of 5252 cc (320.5 cu in) and 115 PS (85 kW) was used. The performance remained the same. Between 1937 and 1938 16 cars were built.

From 1938 a larger powerplant of 5401 cc (329.6 cu in) and 110 PS (81 kW) was used. Vehicles of this model were used by Adolf Hitler and his staff in parades marking the annexation of Austria and the Sudetenland. Thirty cars of this model were built, ending in 1939.

== Today ==
Of the 57 cars produced, at least four exist in original form:

A car used during the annexation of Czechoslovakia and Austria before the war is preserved at the Sinsheim Auto & Technik Museum. After World War II, this vehicle was first converted to a fire engine, before finally being restored and donated to the museum.

Another G4, originally a gift from Hitler to Spanish dictator Francisco Franco, is in the car collection of the Spanish Royal Guard, displayed in the "Sala Histórica de la Guardia Real" located in the quarterings of El Pardo. It was restored by the Mercedes-Benz Classic Center in Germany on behalf of Mercedes-Benz Spain as a gift to the royal family. This car featured an illuminated Virgin Mary medallion set within the dash board.

A third was used post-war in Hollywood, it was originally found by Paramount Pictures abandoned at Rastenberg where it had been part of Hitler's fleet transport and after it was brought to the USA it was painted overall grey for movie work. It appears in the opening credits and some scenes of the TV series Hogan's Heroes, usually as the staff car of Leon Askin's "General Burkhalter" character. It appeared in many other Hollywood films, mainly war movies. Sometime later it was sold at auction and is now in the hands of the Kevin Wheatcroft Collection in the UK. It has been stripped and fully restored to as new condition, painted blue and black.

A complete replica is located in the American Heritage Museum of Stow, Massachusetts.

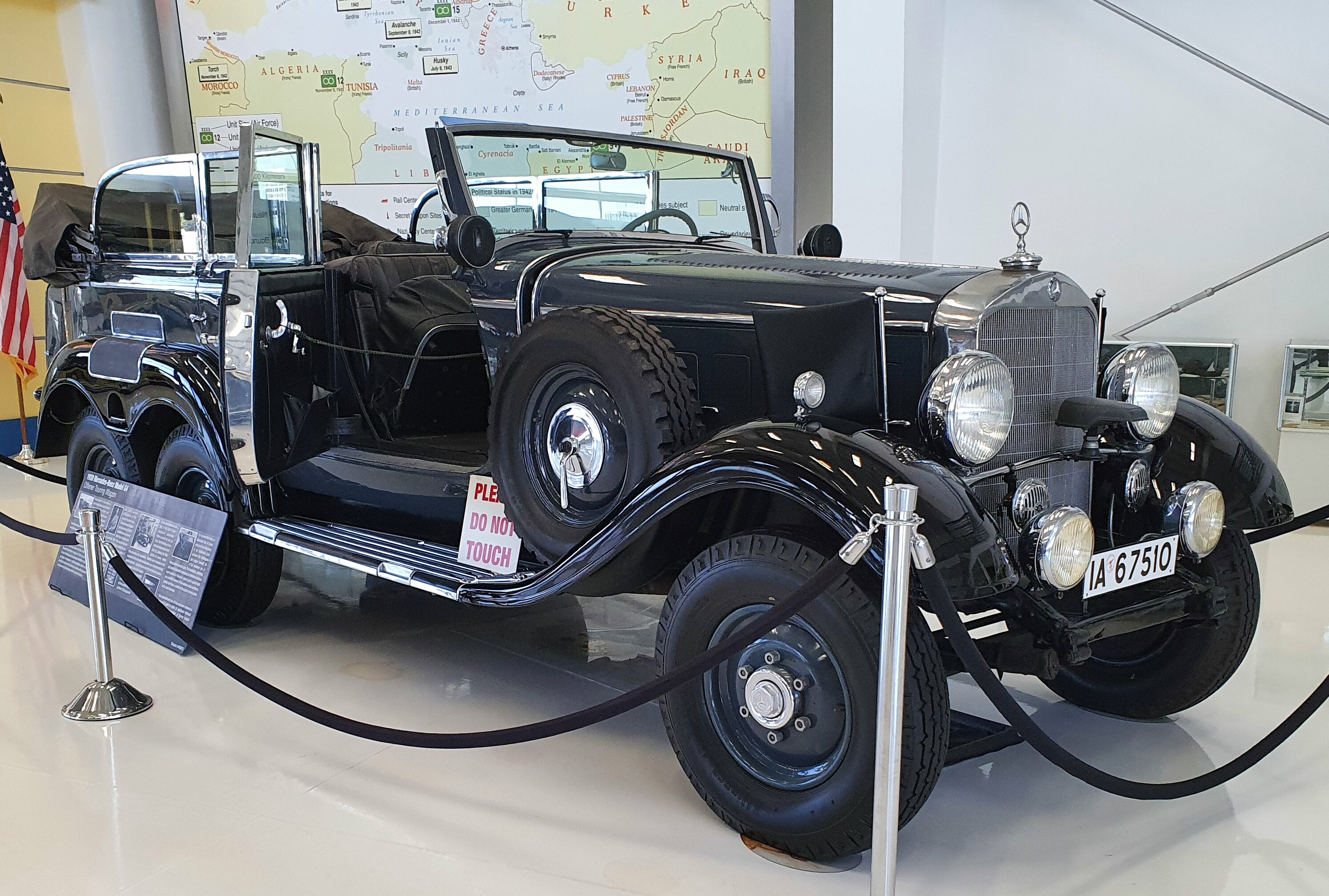
Mercedes Benz G4 - Lyon Air Museum - Santa Ana, California

Another is preserved in the Lyon Air Museum.

In 2009, a classic car collector offered three W31s for sale in the U.S. for $9 million. With unproven ties to Adolf Hitler, they included a blue convertible and a grey Wehrmacht W31 with closed cab. A special feature of the convertible was that the front passenger seat could be folded up, making it possible to stand upright in the car.

== Sources ==
- Werner Oswald: 1886-1986 Mercedes-Benz passenger cars, motor-Verlag, Stuttgart 1987, ISBN 3-613-01133-6
- Ludvigsen, Karl (2014). Professor Porsche's Wars. Pen & Sword Military. pp. 78–81. ISBN 978-1-52672-679-7.
- Taylor, Blaine (1999). Mercedes Benz Parade and Staff Cars of the Third Reich: An Illustrated History. Conshohocken, PA, USA: Combined Publishing. ISBN 0938289934.
- —————— (2009). Hitler's Chariots. Schiffer Military History Book series. Vol. One: Mercedes-Benz G-4 Cross-Country Touring Car. Atglen, PA, USA: Schiffer Publishing. ISBN 9780764332364.
