= Vernam =

Vernam is a surname. Notable people with the surname include:

- Charles Vernam (born 1996), English professional footballer
- Gilbert Vernam (1890–1960), invented an additive polyalphabetic stream cipher and later co-invented an automated one-time pad cipher
- Remington D. B. Vernam (1896–1918), American pilot and World War I flying ace
- Remington Vernam (land developer) (1843–1907), American lawyer and real-estate developer from New York, founder of the community of Arverne

== See also ==
- Vernam Field, former World War II United States Army Air Forces airfield in Clarendon Parish, west-south-west of Kingston, Jamaica
- Vernam cipher, an encryption technique that cannot be cracked, but needs a one-time pre-shared key at least as long as the message being sent
- Enam (disambiguation)
- Erna (disambiguation)
- Vena (disambiguation)
- Vera (disambiguation)
- Verna (disambiguation)
