= 395th Strategic Missile Squadron =

395th Strategic Missile Squadron (later 395th Tactical Missile Squadron)
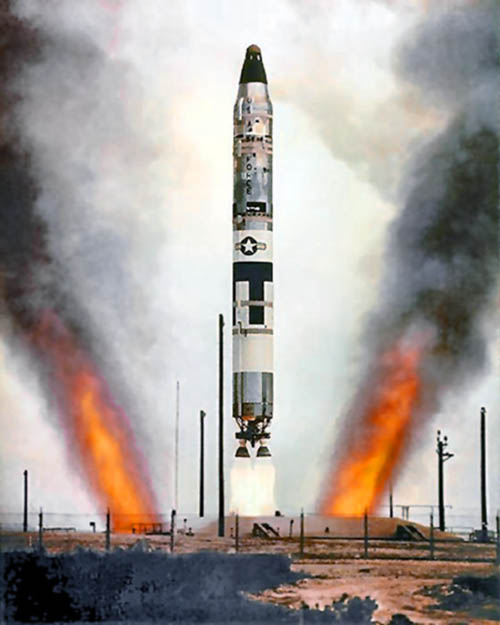
- Launch of a LGM-25C Titan II ICBM from silo 395-C by the 395th during the 1960s
- Active: 1941–1944; 1959–1969
- Country: United States
- Branch: United States Air Force
- Role: Missile testing
- Engagements: China-Burma-India Theater
- Decorations: Distinguished Unit Citation; Air Force Outstanding Unit Award

Insignia
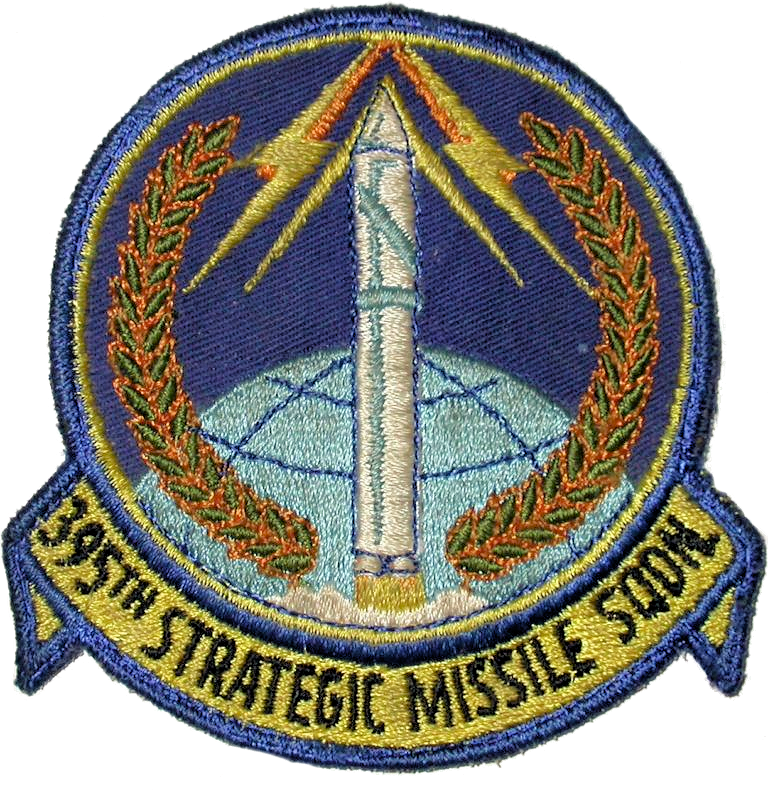
- Patch with 395th Strategic Missile Squadron emblem

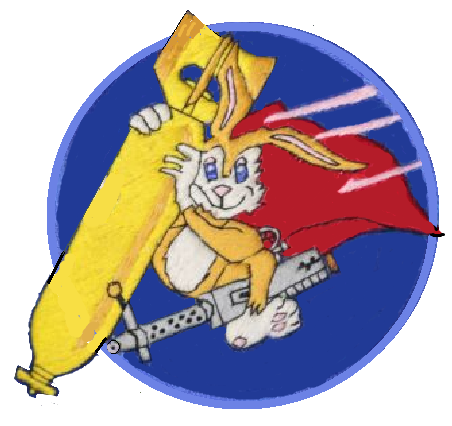
- 395th Bombardment Squadron emblem

The 395th Tactical Missile Squadron is a United States Air Force unit. It has not been active under that name.

The squadron's first predecessor was activated as the 5th Reconnaissance Squadron as the United States Army Air Corps was expanding prior to the entry of the United States into World War II. The squadron moved to Panama as the 395th Bombardment Squadron and participated in the antisubmarine campaign in the Caribbean Sea until 1943. It moved to the United States to convert to a Boeing B-29 Superfortress unit and deployed to the China-Burma-India Theater, where it earned a Distinguished Unit Citation before it was disbanded when the Army Air Forces reorganized its very heavy bomber units from four to three squadrons.

The second predecessor of the squadron was organized in 1959 as the 395th Missile Training Squadron, later redesignated the 395th Strategic Missile Squadron. It trained crews on the SM-68 Titan missile at Vandenberg Air Force Base, California until it was inactivated on 31 December 1969. The two squadrons were consolidated into a single unit as the 395th Tactical Missile Squadron in 1985, but have not been active under that name.

== History ==
=== World War II ===
==== Antisubmarine Warfare ====
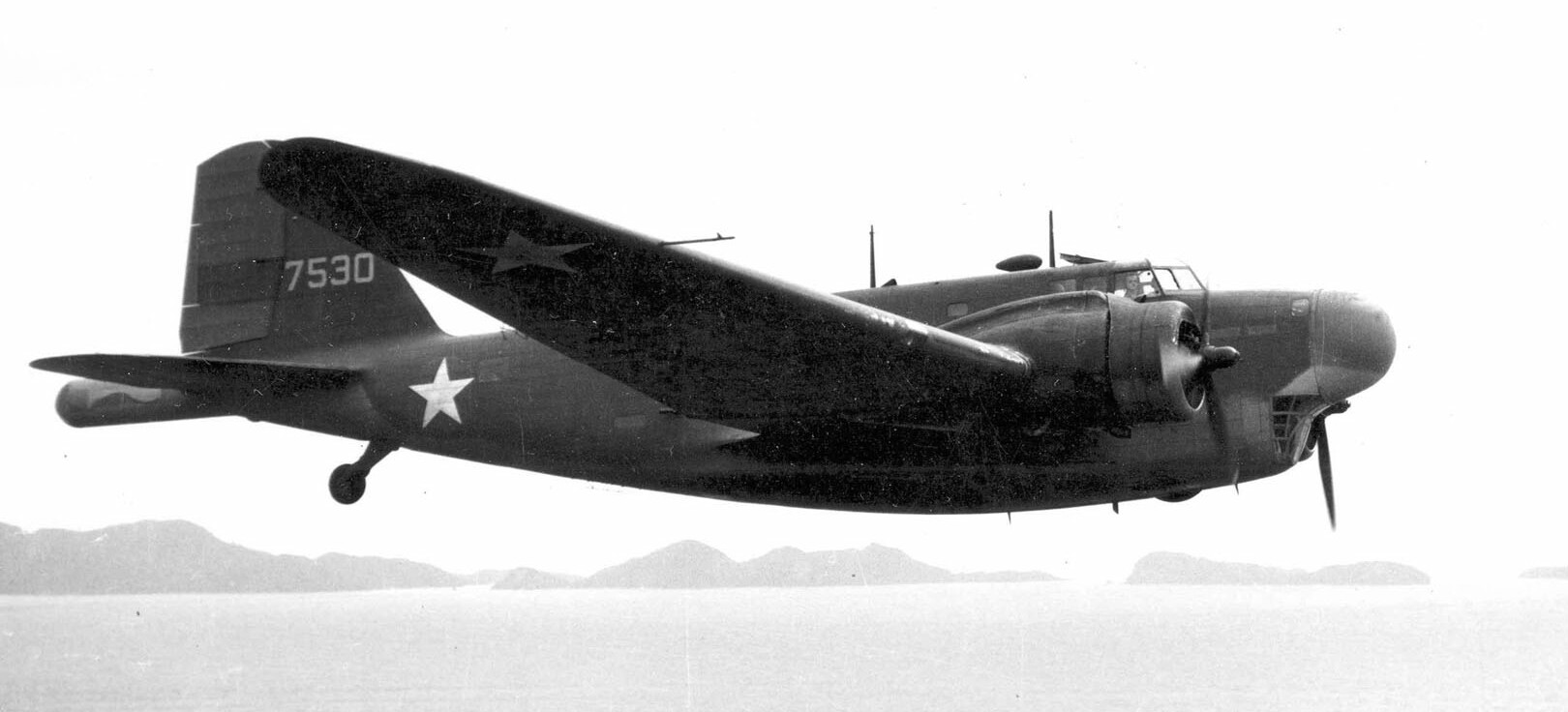
B-18B Bolo with magnetic anomaly detector installed. (Note: Aircraft is Douglas B-18B Bolo, serial 37-530, originally built as a B-18A) with the MAD tail boom. Dirkx, Marco (18 May 2025). "1930-1937 USAF Serial Numbers". Joe Baugher’s Serial Number List.)

The squadron was activated on 1 April 1941 at Borinquen Field, Puerto Rico as the 5th Reconnaissance Squadron and attached to the 40th Bombardment Group. (Note: Since 1 September 1936, a long range reconnaissance squadron was attached to each Air Corps bombardment group. Maurer (1987), p. 340.) It drew its cadre from the 27th Reconnaissance Squadron. Until September, the squadron trained under the 27th, using three of the 27th's Douglas B-18A Bolos.

The squadron made a "good will" flight in July 1941 to Peru, stopping en route Trinidad, Albrook Field and Guayaquil, Ecuador, which gave the unit considerable confidence in the extent of their "reach" as a recon outfit. In November, the unit represented the Air Corps at the opening ceremonies for the new Pan American World Airways airfield at Port-au-Prince, Haiti. After the Japanese Pearl Harbor Attack, the unit was detached from the 40th Bomb Group and assigned briefly to the Antilles Air Task Force to perform antisubmarine patrols along the Antillies chain south to Dutch Guiana.

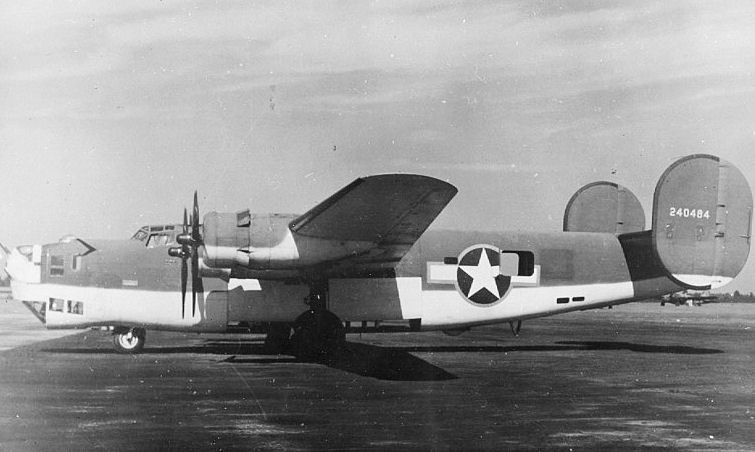
B-24 equipped for antisubmarine warfare

In February 1942, the squadron was assigned to the 40th Group amd on 25 April 1942, it was redesignated the 395th Bombardment Squadron. On 17 June, It moved from Borinquen Field to Rio Hato Army Air Base, Panama, sailing on the SS Florida and the SS Evangeline. The four squadrons of the 40th Group were spread out over Panama. Guatamala and the Canal Zone to provide wider antisubmarine coverage. During 1943, the squadron began to receive various models of the Consolidated B-24 Liberator, along with Boeing B-17 Flying Fortresses, while retaining some B-18s, becoming a "Heavy", rather than a "Medium" squadron. On 9 August, shortly after arriving in Panama, it was reassigned to the 6th Bombardment Group. The squadron received an infusion of new personnel in December 1942, when, upon inactivation of the 6th Bombardment Group, many of the former members of that headquarters were transferred to the 395th along with new aircraft.

In April 1943, the War Department reduced the Caribbean defenses to "a coastal command that may be subject to minot attacks." On 27 April 1943, the squadron temporarily transferred to David Field, Panama and, the following month, reassigned to the 40th Group and moved to Howard Field in the Canal Zone, preparatory to its return to the United States on the USAT George Washington* Northrop A-17, 1942 on 15 June 1943,

==== Combat in China and India ====
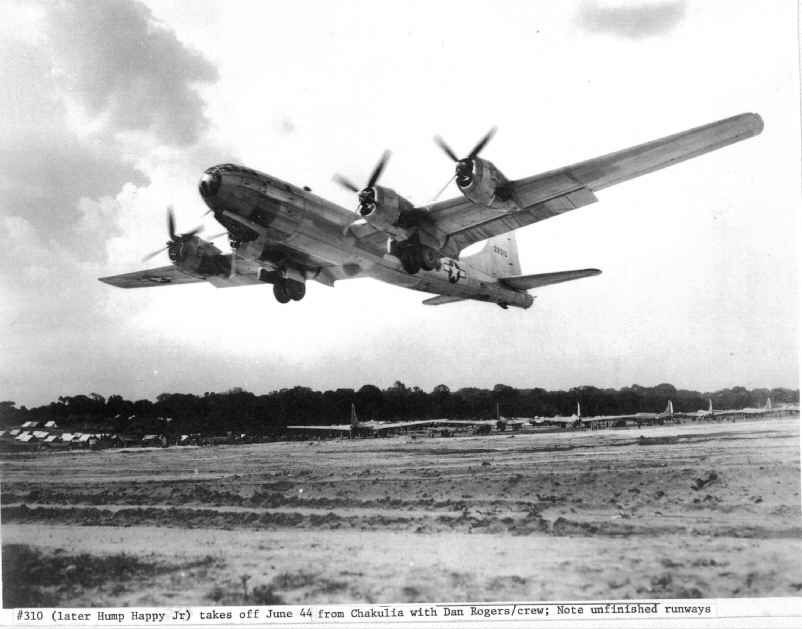
B-29 Superfortress taking off from Chakulia (Note: Aircraft is Boeing B-29 Superfortress, serial 42-6310, Hump Happy Jr.. After an accident in November 1944, it was repaired and returned to the united States as a TB-29 trainer. Dirkx, Marco (23 February 2024). "1942 USAF Serial Numbers". Joe Baugher’s Serial Number List.)

The squadron moved to Pratt Army Air Field, Kansas in August 1943. By the end of the month all squadron personnel had been transferred to Walker Army Air Field and new personnel were assigned. The squadron equipped with prototype and early production-model Boeing B-29 Superfortress very heavy bombers. The squadron left Pratt in March 1943, arriving at its base in India, Chakulia Airfield, the following month,

Upon its arrival in India, the squadron began making supply flights over the Hump to forward bases in China. It flew its first combat operation, an attack on railroads in Bangkok, Thailand, on 5 June. Ten days later, the squadron participated in the first American Air Force attack on the Japanese Home Islands since the 1942 Doolittle Raid. From its base in India, the squadron struck transportation centers, naval installations, iron factories and aircraft plants in Burma, Thailand China, Indonesia and Japan, staging through advanced bases in China to reach nore distant targets

On 20 August the squadron attacked the Imperial Iron and Steel Works at Yawata on Kyushu by using its forward staging base at Hsinching Airfield, China, for refueling, for which it was awarded a Distinguished Unit Citation. It performed a total of nine missions to Japan while stationed in India. It also engaged in aerial mining of Japanese-occupied seaports. Staging through bases in Ceylon (Sri Lanka), it flew mining operations to harbors as distant as Palembang, Sumatra.

In 1944, B-29 groups reorganized from four squadrons of 7 airplanes into three squadrons of 10 planes each. In this reorganization, The squadron was disbanded in October 1944.

=== Missile training and testing ===
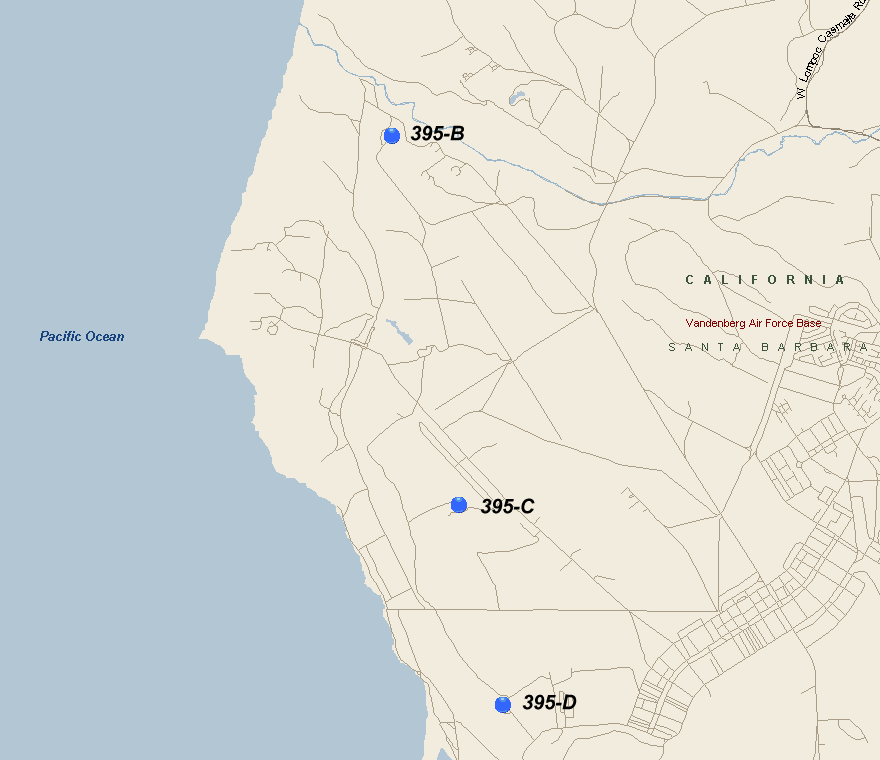
LGM-25C Titan II Sites

The 395th Missile Training Squadron was activated at Vandenberg Air Force Base in February 1959 and assigned to the 704th Strategic Missile Wing. Its mission was to conduct operational readiness training and support the combat training launch program for the SM-68 Titan I intercontinental ballistic missile. In December 1960, a Titan I exploded in its launch site at Vandenberg with no injuries. In September 1961, the first "silo lift" test launch from Vandenberg was successful, and the following January, the first Titan I launch by a Strategic Air Command (SAC) crew took place. It operated one training facility for the Titan I, launch complex 395A, which was turned over to SAC in January 1962. In May 1964, Secretary of Defense Robert S. McNamara accelerated the phaseout of the Titan I, directing that it be completed by June 1965. The last launch of a Titan I by SAC from Vandenberg took place on 5 March 1965.

The squadron was also part of the development of the LGM-25C Titan II. The first successful Titan II launch at Vandenberg was in April 1963, and the first operational test launch in March 1965. The 395th operated three launch silos at Vandenberg for operational testing and development of the Titan II. They were constructed between 1960 and 1962:

395-B (17 Feb 1964 – 29 May 1969), 34°46′57″N 120°36′26″W
395-C (16 Feb 1963 – 27 Jun 1976), 34°44′02″N 120°35′47″W
395-D (13 May 1963 – 5 Apr 1966), 34°42′27″N 120°35′22″W

Six months after activation, the squadron was reassigned to the 1st Missile Division. Except for two months in 1962, when it was part of the 392d Strategic Missile Wing, it would remain assigned to the division until inactivating at the end of 1969. Its mission was assumed by the 6596th Missile Test Group.

=== Consolidation ===
In September 1985, the two squadrons were consolidated into a single unit, designated the 395th Tactical Missile Squadron. However, the squadron has not been active since.

== Lineage ==
395th Bombardment Squadron

- Constituted as the 5th Reconnaissance Squadron (Medium) on 22 November 1940

Activated on 1 April 1941
Redesignated 395th Bombardment Squadron (Medium) on 22 April 1942
Redesignated 395th Bombardment Squadron (Heavy) on 7 May 1942
Redesignated 395th Bombardment Squadron, Very Heavy on 20 November 1943
Disbanded on 20 October 1944

- Reconstituted and consolidated with the 395th Strategic Missile Squadron as the 395th Tactical Missile Squadron on 19 September 1985

395th Tactical Missile Squadron

- Constituted as the 395th Missile Training Squadron (ICBM-Titan)

Activated on 1 February 1959
Redesignated 395th Strategic Missile Squadron (ICBM-Titan) on 1 February 1964
Inactivated on 31 December 1969

- Consolidated with the 395th Bombardment Squadron as the 395th Tactical Missile Squadron on 19 September 1985

=== Assignments ===
- 19th Bombardment Wing,1 April 1941 (attached to 40th Bombardment Group)
- 6th Bomber Command, 25 October 1941 (attached to 40th Bombardment Group)
- 40th Bombardment Group, 25 February 1942
- 6th Bombardment Group, 9 August 1942
- 40th Bombardment Group, 12 May 1943 – 20 October 1944
- 704th Strategic Missile Wing, 1 February 1959 (attached to 1st Missile Division after 6 April 1959)
- 1st Missile Division (later 1st Strategic Aerospace Division), 1 July 1959
- 392d Strategic Missile Wing, 18 October 1961
- 1st Strategic Missile Division, 20 December 1961 – 31 December 1969

=== Stations ===
- Borinquen Field, Puerto Rico, 1 April 1941
- Rio Hato Army Air Base, Panama, 17 June 1942 – 16 June 1943
- Pratt Army Air Field, Kansas, 1 August 1943 – 12 March 1944
- Chakulia Airfield, India, c. 11 April – 20 October 1944
- Vandenberg Air Force Base, California, 1 February 1959 – 31 December 1969

=== Aircraft and missiles ===
Operational aircraft

- Douglas B-18 Bolo, 1941–1943
- Northrop A-17, 1942–1943
- Consolidated B-24 Liberator, 1942–1943
- Consolidated LB-30 Liberator, 1942–1943
- Boeing B-17 Flying Fortress, 1942–1944
- Martin B-26 Marauder, 1943
- Boeing YB-29 Superfortress, 1943
- Boeing B-29 Superfortress, 1943–1944

Missiles

- Martin SM-68A (later HGM-25A) Titan I, 1959–1964
- Martin SM-68C (later LGM-25C) Titan II, 1959–1969

Miscellaneous aircraft in Panama

- Northrop A-17, 1942-1943
- Piper L-4 Grasshopper, 1942-1943
- Luscombe UC-90, 1943

=== Awards and campaigns ===
Award streamer	Award	Dates	Notes
	Presidential Unit Citation	20 August 1944	Yawata, Japan 395th Bombardment Squadron
	Air Force Outstanding Unit Award	1 July 1964–30 June 1966	395th Strategic Missile Squadron
	Air Force Outstanding Unit Award	1 July 1967–30 June 1969	395th Strategic Missile Squadron

Campaign Streamer	Campaign	Dates	Notes
	Antisubmarine	7 December 1941–16 June 1943	5th Reconnaissance Squadron (later 395th Bombardment Squadron)
	India-Burma	c. 11 April 1944–20 October 1944	395th Bombardment Squadron
	Air Offensive, Japan	c. 11 April 1944–20 October 1944	395th Bombardment Squadron
	China Defensive	c. 11 April 1944–20 October 1944	395th Bombardment Squadron

(Note: Maurer also lists credit for the Western Pacific Campaign, but that campaign started on 17 April 1945, after the squadron was disbanded. Maurer, Combat Squadrons, p. 485. Campaign credit is permitted for actual combat after the campaign period, (Maurer, p. 802) but this credit would be for before the campaign period.)

== See also ==
- List of United States Air Force missile squadrons
- B-17 Flying Fortress units of the United States Army Air Forces
- B-24 Liberator units of the United States Army Air Forces
- List of Martin B-26 Marauder operators
- List of B-29 Superfortress operators
