= Enam =

Enam may refer to:

== People ==
- Alexis Enam (born 1986), Cameroonian footballer
- Enam Ahmed Chowdhury (1937-2025), Bangladeshi civil servant
- Enam Ali (1960-2022), Bangladeshi-British businessman

== Places ==
- Enam, Afghanistan, a village in Afghanistan
- Enam, Nancowry, a village in India
- Place mentioned in the Bible, see Enam

== Other uses ==
- 6 (number) in the Indonesian and Malay languages
- ENAM or Enamelin, a human gene
- E-NAM! an electronic trading platform for agricultural products in India

== See also ==
- Inaam, a given name (including a list of people with the name)
