= 394th =

394th may refer to:

- 394th Bombardment Group, unit of the New York Air National Guard, stationed at Francis S. Gabreski Air National Guard Base
- 394th Combat Training Squadron, United States Air Force unit assigned to the 509th Operations Group
- 394th Fighter Squadron, inactive United States Air Force unit
- 394th Infantry Regiment (United States), established in 1918 and assigned to the 99th Division as a member of the National Army
- 394th Strategic Missile Squadron (394 SMS) was an intercontinental ballistic missile that operated the Minuteman and Titan II missile at Vandenberg AFB, California

== See also ==
- 394 (number)
- 394, the year 394 (CCCXCIV) of the Julian calendar
- 394 BC
