= Enam, Afghanistan =

Enam انام
- Hamlet
- Location in Afghanistan
- Coordinates: 34°5′N 68°54′E
- Country: Afghanistan
- Province: Logar Province
- District: Pul-i Alam District
- Time zone: UTC+4:30 (IRST)
  - Summer (DST): UTC+5:30 (IRDT)

Enām is a hamlet in Pul-i Alam District, Logar Province, in eastern Afghanistan. Located at an altitude of about 54 metres, Enam lies about 1 mile southeast of Shulak and some 4 miles northwest of Babus.

== Name ==
The full name of the hamlet is Qal'ah-ye Mullāh An'ām (Dari: قلعه ملا انعام) or Da Mullāh Enām kalaey (Pashto: د ملا انام کلي) meaning "the fort of Mullah An'ām" or "the fort of the beneficient mullah", which may refer to the originator of the hamlet.
