= Vandenberg Space Force Base =

United States Space Force Base in Santa Barbara County, California

- Santa Barbara County, California in United States
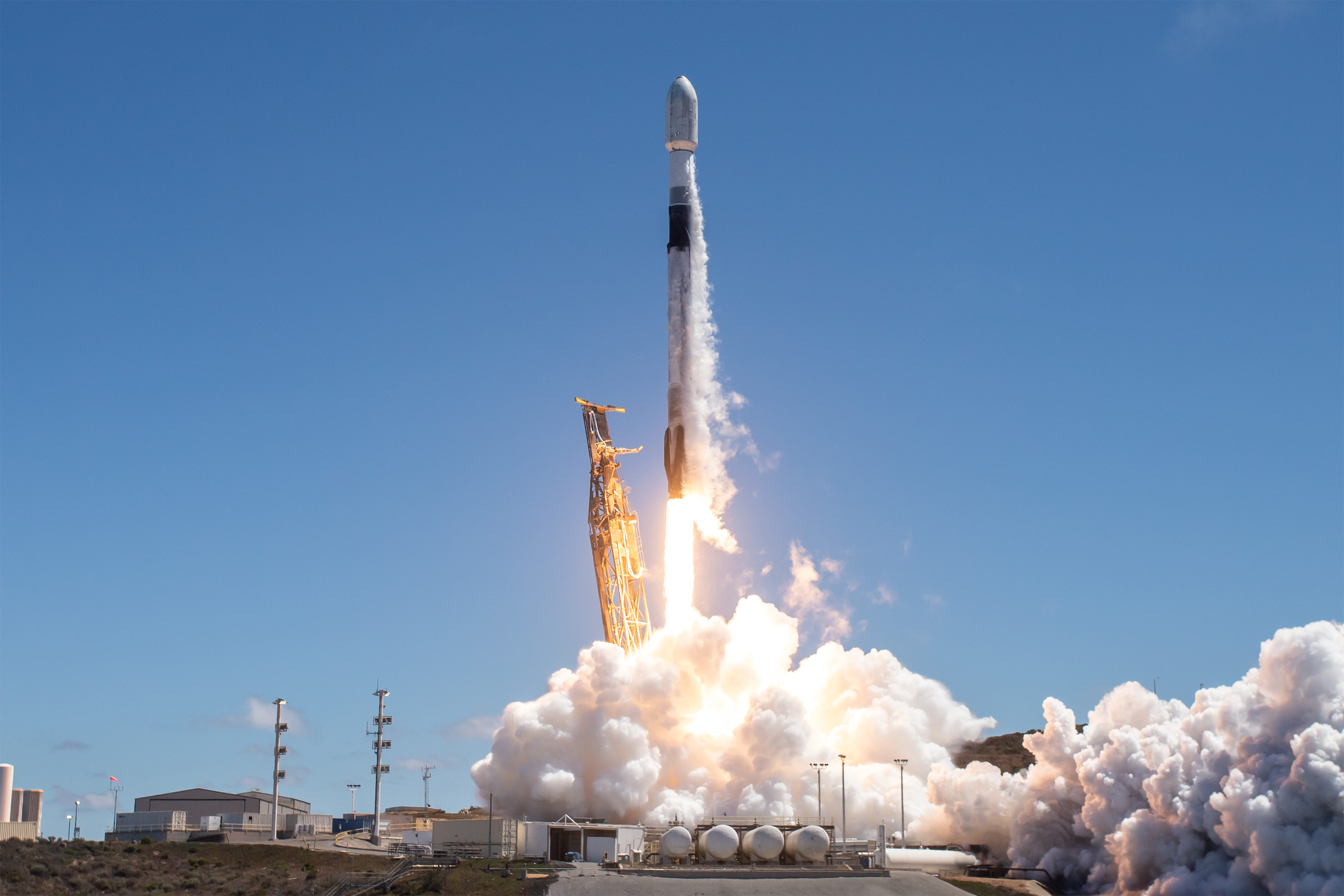
- A Falcon 9 rocket lifts off from Space Launch Complex 4E in 2025.

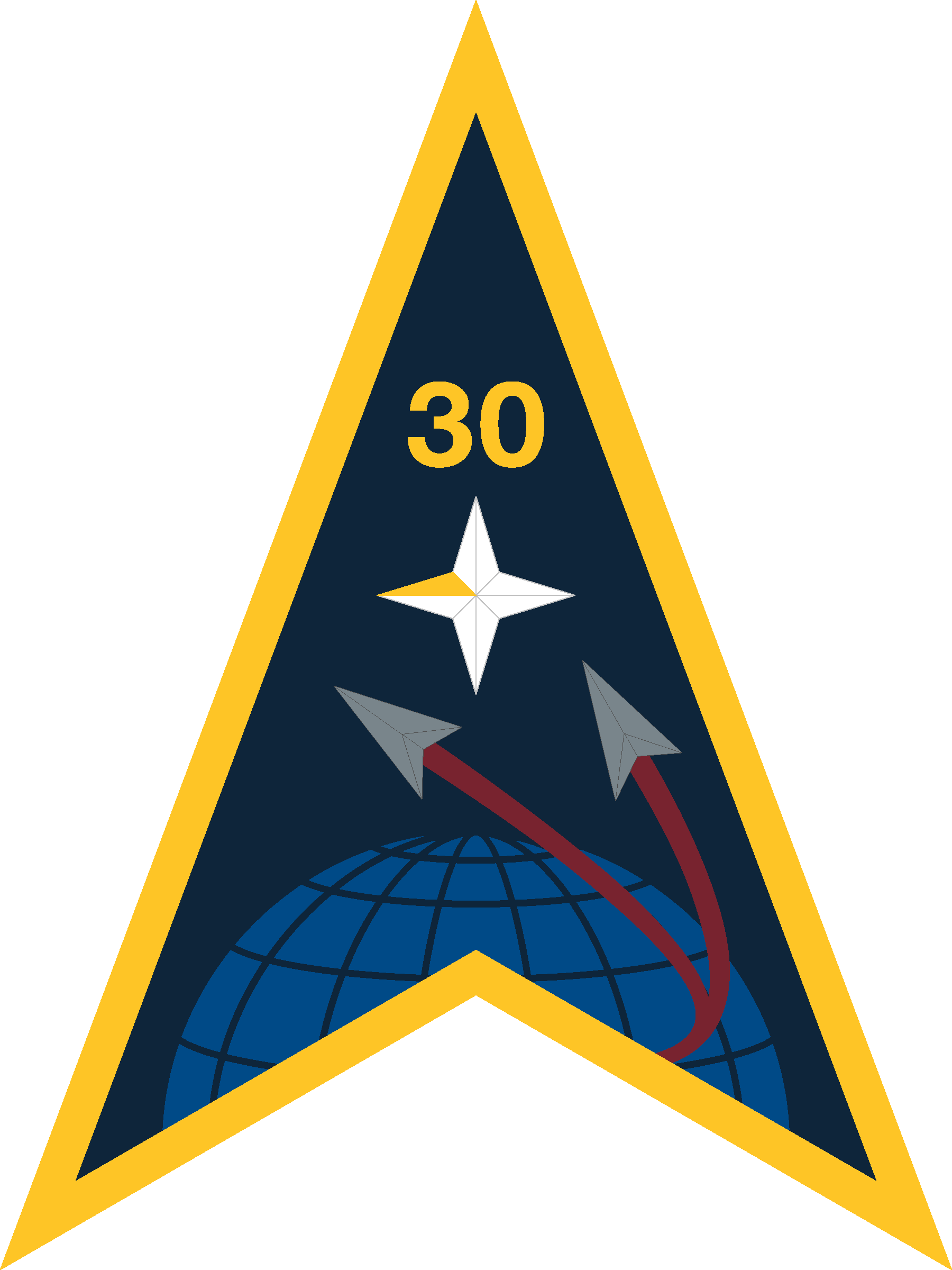
- Space Launch Delta 30

Site information
- Type: U.S. Space Force Base
- Owner: Department of Defense
- Operator: United States Space Force
- Controlled by: Space Launch Delta 30
- Condition: Operational
- Website: vandenberg.spaceforce.mil

Location
- Location within California Location within the United States Location within North America
- Coordinates: 34.751330°N 120.52023°W

Site history
- Built: 1941–1942 (as Camp Cooke)
- In use: 1941–present

Garrison information
- Current commander: Col James T. Horne III

Airfield information
- Identifiers: IATA: VBG, ICAO: KVBG, FAA LID: VBG, WMO: 723930
- Elevation: 112.1 m (368 ft) AMSL
Runways
Direction	Length and surface
12/30	4,572 m (15,000 ft) concrete

Vandenberg Space Force Base (IATA: VBG, ICAO: KVBG, FAA LID: VBG), previously Vandenberg Air Force Base, is a United States Space Force Base in Santa Barbara County, California. Established in 1941, Vandenberg Space Force Base is a space launch base, launching spacecraft from the Western Range, and also performs missile testing. The United States Space Force's Space Launch Delta 30 serves as the host delta for the base, equivalent to an Air Force air base wing. In addition to its military space launch mission, Vandenberg Space Force Base also hosts space launches for civil and commercial space entities, such as NASA and SpaceX.

== History ==
=== United States Army ===
==== Camp Cooke (1941–1953) ====
In 1941, just before the United States entered World War II, the United States Army embarked on an initiative to acquire lands in the United States to be used to train infantry and armored forces. These areas needed to be of a varied nature to ensure relevant training. In March 1941, the Army identified approximately 86,000 acres (35,000 ha) of open ranch lands along the Central Coast of California between Lompoc and Santa Maria. With its flat plateau, surrounding hills, numerous canyons, and relative remoteness from populated areas, the Army was convinced this portion of the Gaviota Coast was an ideal training location. The government purchased most of the land, however, some smaller parcels were obtained either by lease, license, or as easements. The land was previously part of six ranchos: Casmalia, Guadalupe, Mission de la Purisima, Rancho Lompoc and Rancho Todos Santos y San Antonio, and Jesús María.

Construction of the Army camp began in September 1941. Although unfinished, the camp was activated on 5 October and was named Camp Cooke in honor of Phillip St. George Cooke, a cavalry officer with a distinguished career spanning the Mexican War, Indian Wars, and the Civil War.

Troop training didn't wait for construction to finish. The 5th Armored Division was the first to arrive in February and March 1942. Throughout the war, Camp Cooke served as a training ground for numerous armored and infantry divisions before their deployment overseas. Additionally, anti-aircraft artillery, combat engineer, ordnance, and hospital units trained at Cooke. In total, over 400 groups passed through the camp.

As the war progressed, Camp Cooke was used to house German and Italian prisoners of war. Following the Geneva Convention, the groups were kept separate and assigned various jobs within the camp, including construction, clerical work, food service, and laundry. To address wartime labor shortages, German prisoners also participated in agricultural work in nearby communities.

After the war's conclusion in 1946, Camp Cooke became home to a maximum-security military prison, while most of the land was largely leased for agriculture and grazing. From 1950 to 1953, Camp Cooke served again as a training ground for units heading to the Korean War. In 1953, the camp was inactivated, and the military prison became a federal prison for civilians, now known as the United States Penitentiary, Lompoc.

The final remaining buildings from Camp Cooke were demolished in 2010.

==== Known United States Army Units at Camp Cooke ====
World War II

- 5th Armored Division
- 81st Armored Regiment
- 6th Armored Division
- 50th Armored Infantry Regiment, 6th Armored Division
- 11th Armored Division
- 13th Armored Division
- 20th Armored Division
- 86th Infantry Division
- 97th Infantry Division
- 2nd Filipino Infantry Regiment

Korean War

- 40th Infantry Division
- 44th Infantry Division

=== United States Air Force ===
==== Cooke Air Force Base ====
As the 1950s ushered in the age of missiles, and the United States urgently needed a training ground that could also serve as an initial combat ready missile base. In 1956, after examining over 200 potential locations, a committee selected Camp Cooke. Similar to its appeal in 1941 for the Army, Camp Cooke's vast size, remoteness, moderate climate, and coastal location made it ideal. Missiles could be launched westward over the Pacific Ocean without flying over populated areas, and satellites could be placed into polar orbit towards the South Pole without traversing any landmass until reaching Antarctica.

Following the committee's recommendation, on 16 November 1956, the Secretary of Defense directed the Army to transfer 64,000 acres (26,000 ha) to the United States Air Force. This land was initially called North Camp Cooke, but when the official transfer happened on 21 June 1957 it was named Cooke Air Force Base.

The first airmen of the 6591st Support Squadron arrived on 15 February, before the official transfer, and found the base in rough shape. World War II-era buildings were dilapidated, and roads needed extensive repair. Over the next two years, launch and control facilities emerged, old structures were renovated, and new housing was built. The initial mission of the base was to train personnel on the PGM-17 Thor, SM-65 Atlas, and HGM-25A Titan I missiles, while also serving as an emergency operational facility for the Atlas.

The 1957 launch of Sputnik by the Soviet Union intensified the urgency of the U.S. missile program. In November, the Department of Defense authorized ballistic missile launches from Cooke AFB. Management responsibility shifted from the Air Research and Development Command (ARDC) to the Strategic Air Command (SAC) in January 1958. SAC assumed responsibility for training missile launch crews and achieving initial operational capability. ARDC retained oversight of site activation, research, and development testing. This began a close working relationship between the two commands that would last 35 years.

In February 1958, the PGM-19 Jupiter program was transferred from the Army to the Air Force. SAC established squadrons for both the Jupiter and Atlas missiles at Cooke. Construction also began on the Operational System Test Facility for the Titan I. The first Thor missile arrived later that year.

The southern 19,800 acres (8,000 ha) of Cooke AFB was transferred to the Navy in May 1958 for their Pacific Missile Range. However, in 1963, a restructuring returned major sections of this range, including Point Arguello, to the Air Force. This move gave the Air Force full responsibility for missile range safety at Vandenberg and much of the Pacific Ocean. The Air Force renamed the area the Western Range.

==== Vandenberg Air Force Base ====
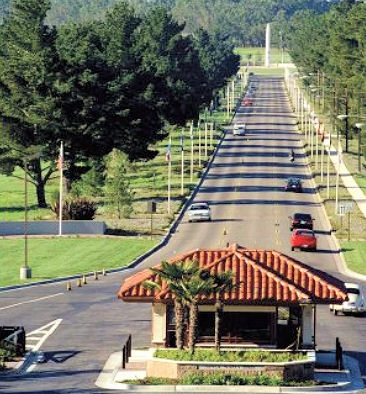
Vandenberg Space Force Base main gate

The facility was renamed Vandenberg Air Force Base on 4 October 1958 in honor of General Hoyt Vandenberg, the Air Force's second Chief of Staff.

The final acquisition of 15,000 acres (6,100 ha) of land for the base occurred in 1966 to accommodate the construction of Space Launch Complex 6 for the Manned Orbiting Laboratory program. With the annexation, the base reached its final size, 99,099 acres (40,104 ha).

==== PGM-17 Thor ====
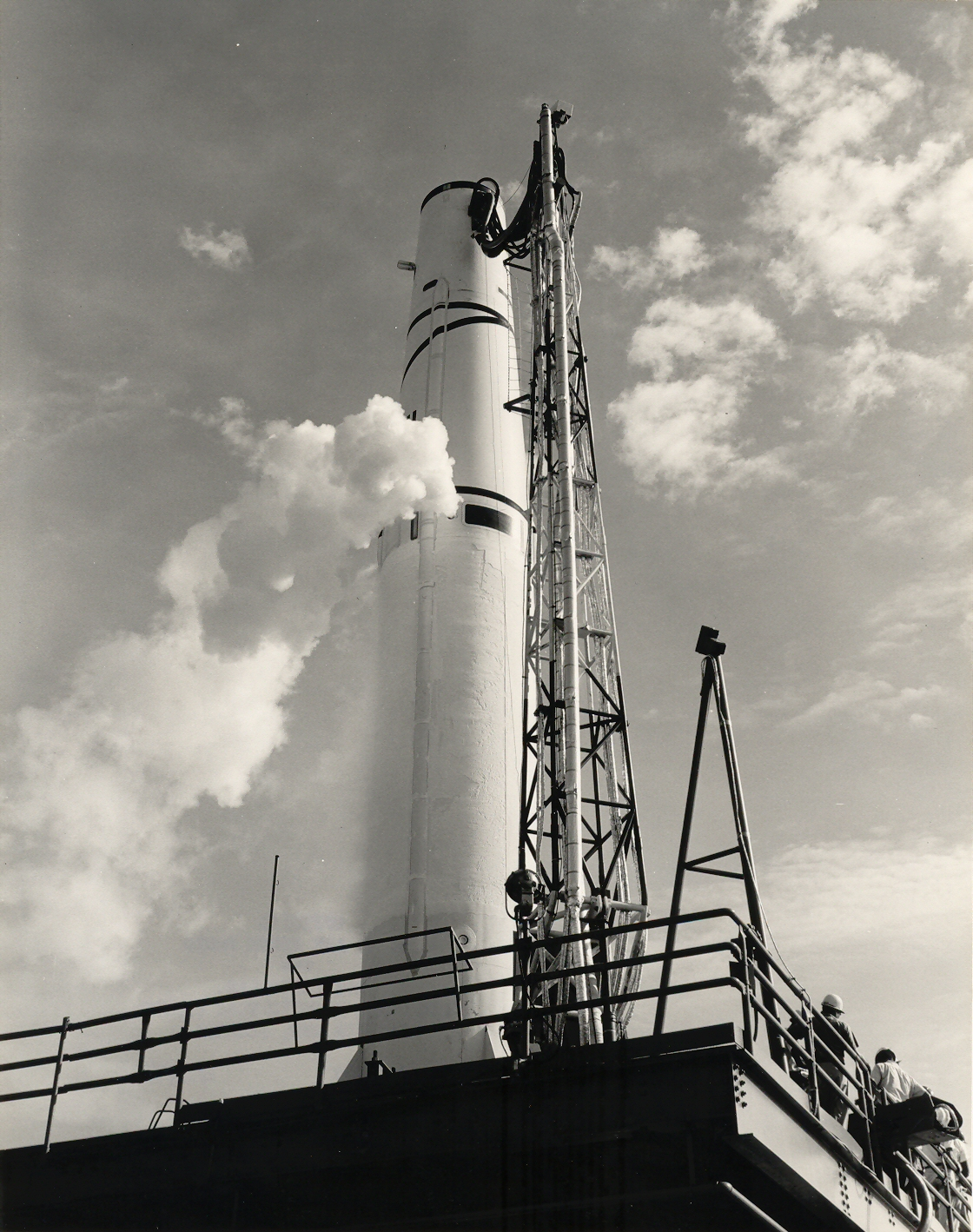
PGM-17 Thor IRBM

The transition from U.S. Army camp to missile base solidified on 15 December 1958 when Vandenberg AFB successfully launched its first missile, a PGM-17 Thor IRBM (Intermediate Range Ballistic Missile). The launch from Vandenberg inaugurated the intermediate-range ballistic missile portion of the Pacific Missile Range and was fired by a crew from the 1st Missile Division. The first successful launch of a Thor IRBM by a Royal Air Force crew took place at Vandenberg AFB on 16 April 1959. The launch was part of integrated weapon system training. In October 1959, the first combat training launch of a Thor IRBM by a Royal Air Force crew was successful.

On 22 April 1960, the fourth and final British-based Thor IRBM squadron was turned over to the Royal Air Force by the Strategic Air Command, thus completing the deployment of this weapon system in the United Kingdom. The next month, the first missile to be removed from an operational unit and sent to Vandenberg AFB for confidence firing arrived from a Thor IRBM squadron (No. 98 Squadron RAF) in the United Kingdom. Confidence firing was the predecessor of SAC's operational test program.

==== SM-65 Atlas ====
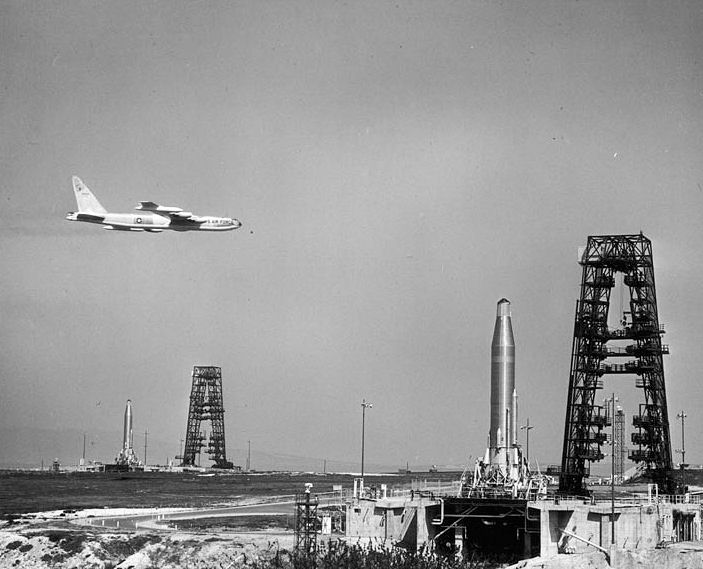
Atlas missiles on alert, 1960

On 16 October 1958, the first Atlas ICBM launcher (576A-1) constructed at Vandenberg AFB, California, was accepted from the contractor by the 1st Missile Division. The first intercontinental ballistic missile, the SM-65D Atlas ICBM, was delivered and was accepted by SAC's 576th Strategic Missile Squadron on 18 February 1959. The first Atlas-D flew on 9 September 1959, and following the successful launch, General Thomas S. Power, CINCSAC, declared the Atlas ICBM to be operational. The following month, equipped with a nuclear warhead, the Atlas at Vandenberg became the first ICBM to be placed on alert in the United States. It was an SM-69D Atlas ICBM (AFSN 58-2190) on launcher 576A-1. In April 1960, the first attempted launch of a Series D Atlas ICBM from a coffin-type launcher (576B-2) was successful. This launcher was the prototype of the ones to be used at the first operational Atlas squadron, the 564th Strategic Missile Squadron, Francis E. Warren Air Force Base, Wyoming. Following this successful launch, Major General David Wade, Commander of the 1st Missile Division, declared the coffin-type launcher to be operational.

In July 1959, construction began on the first Series E Atlas ICBM coffin-type launcher (Atlas operational system test facility #1). On 28 February 1962, the first successful launch of the SM-65E Atlas took place. Construction began on the first SM-65F Atlas ICBM "silo-lift" launcher (Atlas operational system test facility #2) in November 1962. The first Atlas F arrived in June 1961 and the first operationally configured Series F Atlas was successfully launched on 1 August 1962.

During its testing phase, Vandenberg would operate two Atlas-D launch complexes; two Atlas-E, and three Atlas-F silos. The Atlas-Ds were taken off alert at the 576th Strategic Missile Squadron (Complex 576B) in May 1964 as part of the phaseout of the Atlas from active ICBM service. The last Atlas F test launch was on 18 January 1965, and the 576th Strategic Missile Squadron was inactivated on 2 April 1966. The 576th SMS carried out 53 Atlas-D, 7 Atlas-E and 7 Atlas-F test launches between 1959 and 1965.

The Atlas would remain in use as a launch vehicle for satellites from Vandenberg as a space booster configured with an RM-81 Agena upper-stage rocket and the Atlas-Agena would launch many different types of satellites into orbit until its phaseout in the late 1980s.

===== HGM-25A Titan I =====
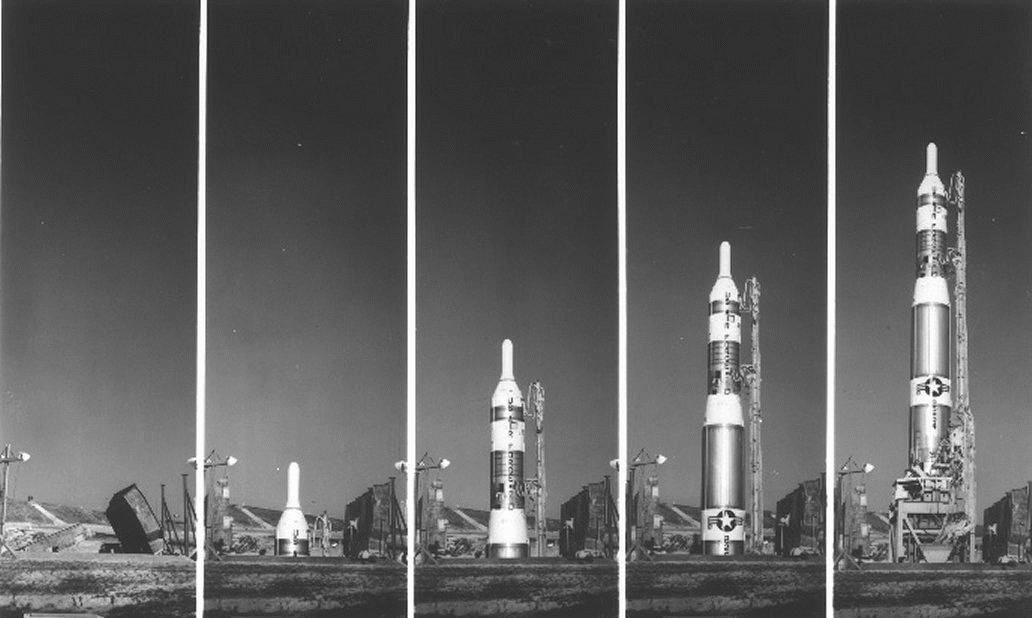
Titan I missile emerges from its silo at Vandenberg Operational System Test Facility in 1960.

The HGM-25A Titan I was the United States' first multistage ICBM. When designed and manufactured, the Titan I provided an additional nuclear deterrent to complement the U.S. Air Force's SM-65 Atlas missile. It was the first in a series of Titan rockets, and was an important step in building the Air Force's strategic nuclear forces.

In July 1958, construction began on the Titan I ICBM Operational System Test Facility (OSTF). This was the prototype of the hardened Titan I launch control facility at its operational sites. It consisted of one silo-lift launcher, blockhouse, and associated equipment. Designated "OSTF-8", the facility was destroyed on 3 December 1960 when the launcher elevator failed while lowering a fully fueled missile back into the silo. There were no injuries. This was the first silo accident at Vandenberg.

The first "silo-lift" launch of the Titan I was successful in September 1961, and the first SAC launch of the ICBM was successful in January 1962. As a result, the Titan I ICBM launch complex (395-A1/A2/A3) at Vandenberg was turned over to the Strategic Air Command 395th Strategic Missile Squadron to perform test launches of the missile.

However, the operational lifetime of the Titan I was short, as Secretary of Defense McNamara announced in November 1964 that all remaining first-generation ICBMs (Series E and F Atlas and Titan I) would be phased out (Project Added Effort) by the end of June 1965.

On 5 March 1965, the last test launch of a Titan I ICBM conducted by the Strategic Air Command at Vandenberg was successful. The 395th SMS performed 19 test launches between 1963 and 1965 before moving on to exclusively Titan II testing. During the 1980s, some Titan I second stages were used as targets for early Strategic Defense Initiative (SDI) testing.

===== LGM-25C Titan II =====
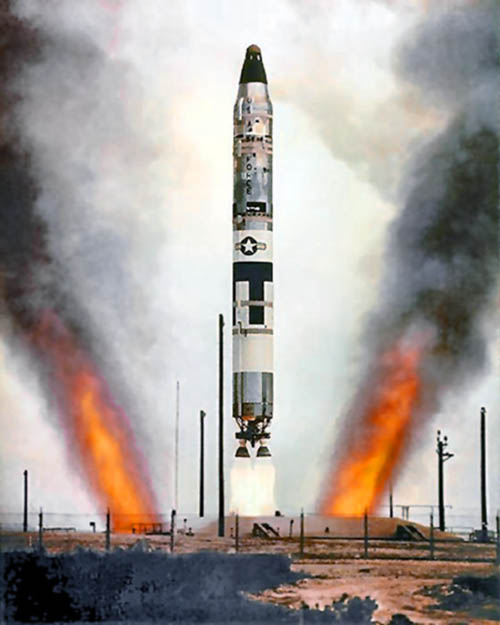
Titan II test launch from Vandenberg

The LGM-25C Titan II ICBM was a second-generation ICBM with storable propellants, all inertial guidance, and in-silo launch capability. Construction of the first Titan II site began in 1962, and eventually Vandenberg operated four Titan II launch complexes.

Most of the testing of the missile was done at Cape Kennedy Air Force Station, Florida by the 6555th Aerospace Test Group, and the first successful underground silo launch of a Titan II ICBM took place at Vandenberg by the 395th SMS in April 1963. The first fully operational test took place in March 1965.

On 25 March 1966, the 200th SAC missile launched from Vandenberg AFB, California was a Titan II. The operational testing of the Titan II continued until 1985. Like its predecessor the Atlas ICBM, the Titan II GLV a derivative of that missile was used to launch Project Gemini spacecraft and the Titan 23G was used as a space booster to launch satellites. The final launch of a Titan II was made in 2003 when the last Titan IIG was expended.

===== LGM-30 Minuteman =====
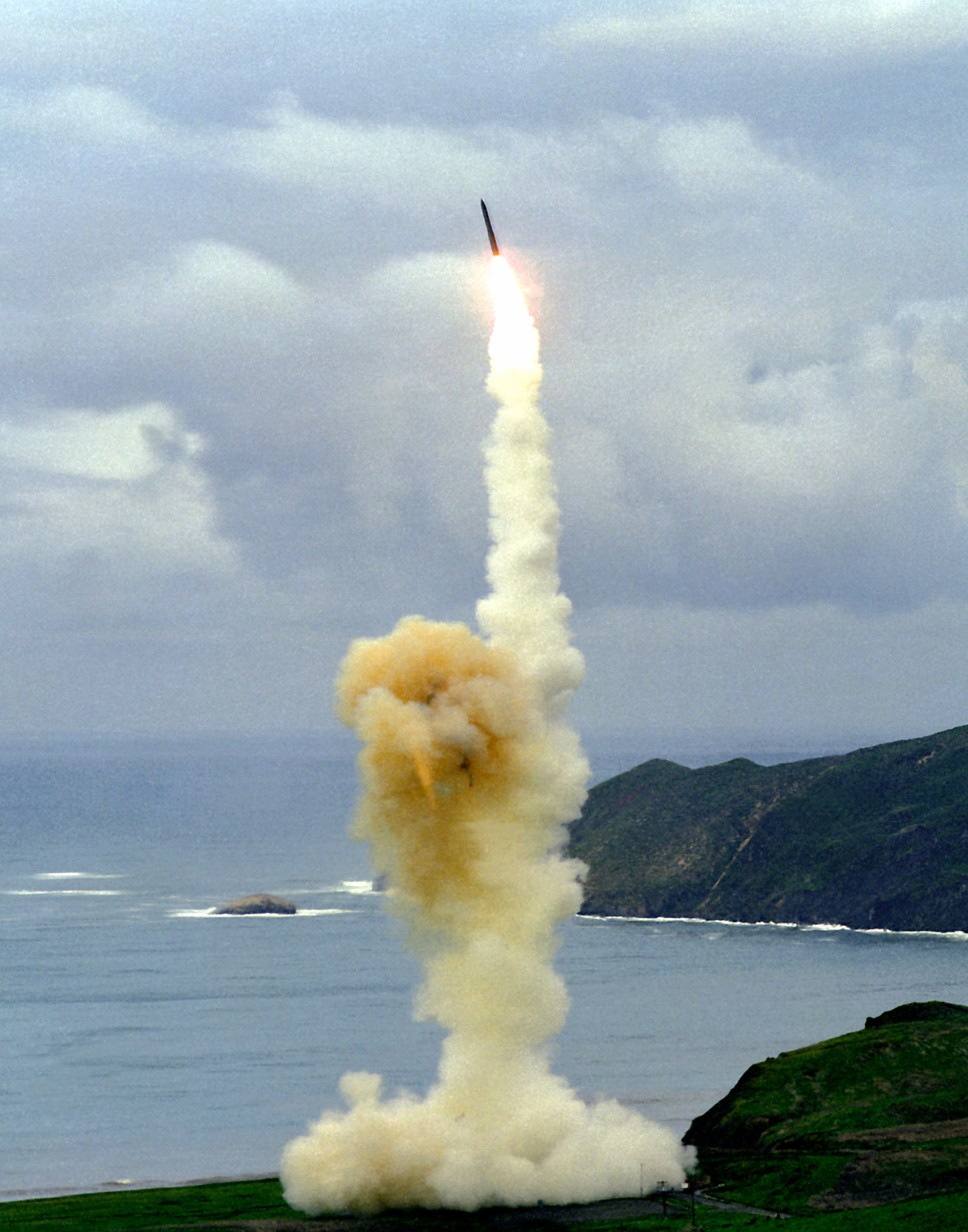
Minuteman 3 missile launch

The advent of solid-propellant gave the three-stage LGM-30 Minuteman ICBM a major advantage over earlier liquid propellant ICBMs. In February 1961, the construction began on Minuteman ICBM test launch facilities at Vandenberg. Silos 394A-1 through A-7 were the first constructed for use by the SAC 394th Strategic Missile Squadron.

LGM-30A Minuteman IA flight tests began in September 1962. The first Minuteman IB test took place in May 1963. On 24 February 1966, the first attempted salvo (simultaneous) launch of two model "A" Minuteman I ICBMs from Vandenberg silos LF-04 (394A-3) and LF-06 (394-A5) was successful. This launch demonstrated the multiple countdown and launch techniques that would be used at operational bases under actual combat conditions. Minuteman I testing continued until 1968.

LGM-30F Minuteman II testing began in August 1965 with the first launch conducted by Air Force Systems Command, was successful. The missile flew 5,000 mi (8,000 km) down the Pacific Missile Range and its reentry vehicle impacted in the target area.

On 22 October 1970, the first attempted OT GT70F (Salvo) operational test launch (simultaneous) launch of two Minuteman II ICBMs was successful from LF-25 and LF-26. The last Minuteman II phase I operational test was performed in April 1972.

The first LGM-30G Minuteman III phase II operational test was launched on 5 December 1972 from the LF-02 silo. The ICBM flew 800 mi (1,300 km) downrange before impacting in the Pacific Ocean. This was the beginning of Minuteman III launches which continue to this day from Vandenberg.

In July 1974, the initial training of Minuteman missile combat crews, formerly performed by Air Training Command (ATC) instructors at Vandenberg AFB, California, was incorporated into the 4315th Combat Crew Training Squadron's Operational Readiness Training (ORT) program at Vandenberg. As a result of this action, the entire Minuteman missile combat training, from beginning (initial training) to end (upgrade training) became the responsibility of Strategic Air Command.

SAC launched two Minuteman III ICBMs from Vandenberg AFB during exercise Global Shield, a comprehensive exercise of SAC's nuclear forces on 10 July 1979 from LF 08 and LF 09. One of these Global Shield missions, Glory Trip 40 GM, was the last Minuteman III phase I operational test flight. The missiles were launched 12 seconds apart by a SAC task force from the 90th Strategic Missile Wing, Francis E. Warren Air Force Base, Wyoming.

Glory Trip 77GM, a Minuteman III Operational Test in September 1980, became the longest Minuteman flight test when its payload impacted a broad ocean area target over 5,600 nmi (10,400 km) downrange.

===== LGM-118 Peacekeeper =====
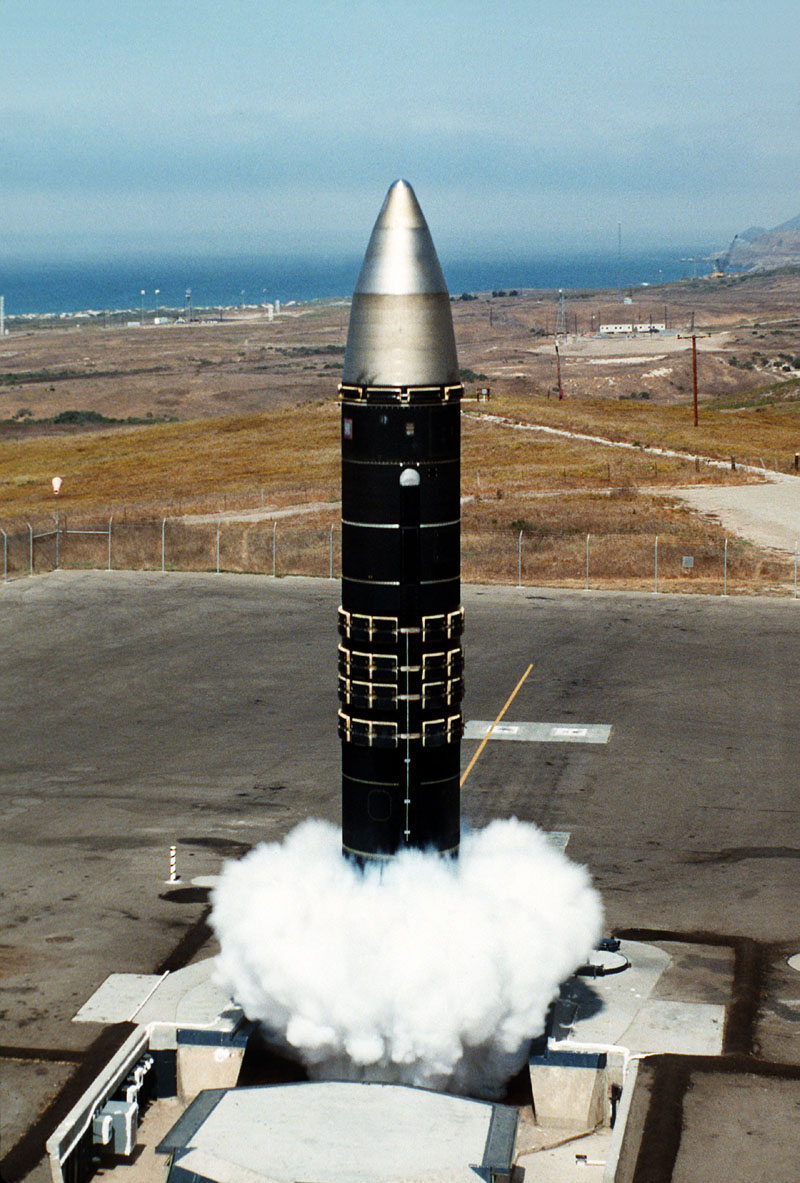
Test launch of LGM-118 Peacekeeper

The last ICBM tested from Vandenberg was the LGM-118 Peacekeeper (MX) ICBM beginning in June 1983. In addition to having a longer range than earlier ICBMs, the Peacekeeper could deliver up to 10 reentry vehicles to separate targets. It was intended as a replacement for the LGM-30 Minuteman, but it suffered from a long development time, and was retired in 2005 before the Minuteman because of arms reduction treaties.

The first Peacekeeper ICBM was launched by Air Force Systems Command from an above ground canister-type launch facility from Launch Complex TP-01 on 17 June 1983. This was the first "cold launch" of a missile at Vandenberg AFB, the missile reaching 600 mi (970 km) downrange. Two more test launches were conducted in 1983 from Launch Complex TP-01.

The first Peacekeeper with a Mark-21 test reentry vehicle was flight-tested from TP-01 on 15 June 1984. The Mark-21 resembled the reentry vehicle intended for the Peacekeeper weapon system. Two more test launches were conducted in 1984, the missile from TP-01. Air Force Systems Command conducted the final Peacekeeper launch from the above-ground TP-01 launch pad on 30 June 1985.

The first silo launch from LF-05 took place on 24 August 1985 from LF-08. LF-02 began to be used in 1986 for additional launches. On 23 August 1986 the first launch of a completely operational hardware configured missile and launch facility, and also the first Peacekeeper launch by a SAC combat crew under the control of Air Force Systems Command took place from silo LF-02.

A new Peacekeeper Missile Procedures Trainer was dedicated in March 1987. The US$17 million facility featured a state-of-the-art computer based simulator which would be used to train and evaluate missile crew members. The first LGM-118 Peacekeepers were deployed to Francis E. Warren Air Force Base in Wyoming that year. LGM-118 Peacekeeper test launches continued from Vandenberg with a third silo, LF-05 becoming operational in March 1990. The final launch of a LGM-118 Peacekeeper 33PA took place on 21 July 2004 before the missile was retired from service.

===== Ground-Based Midcourse Defense Interceptor =====
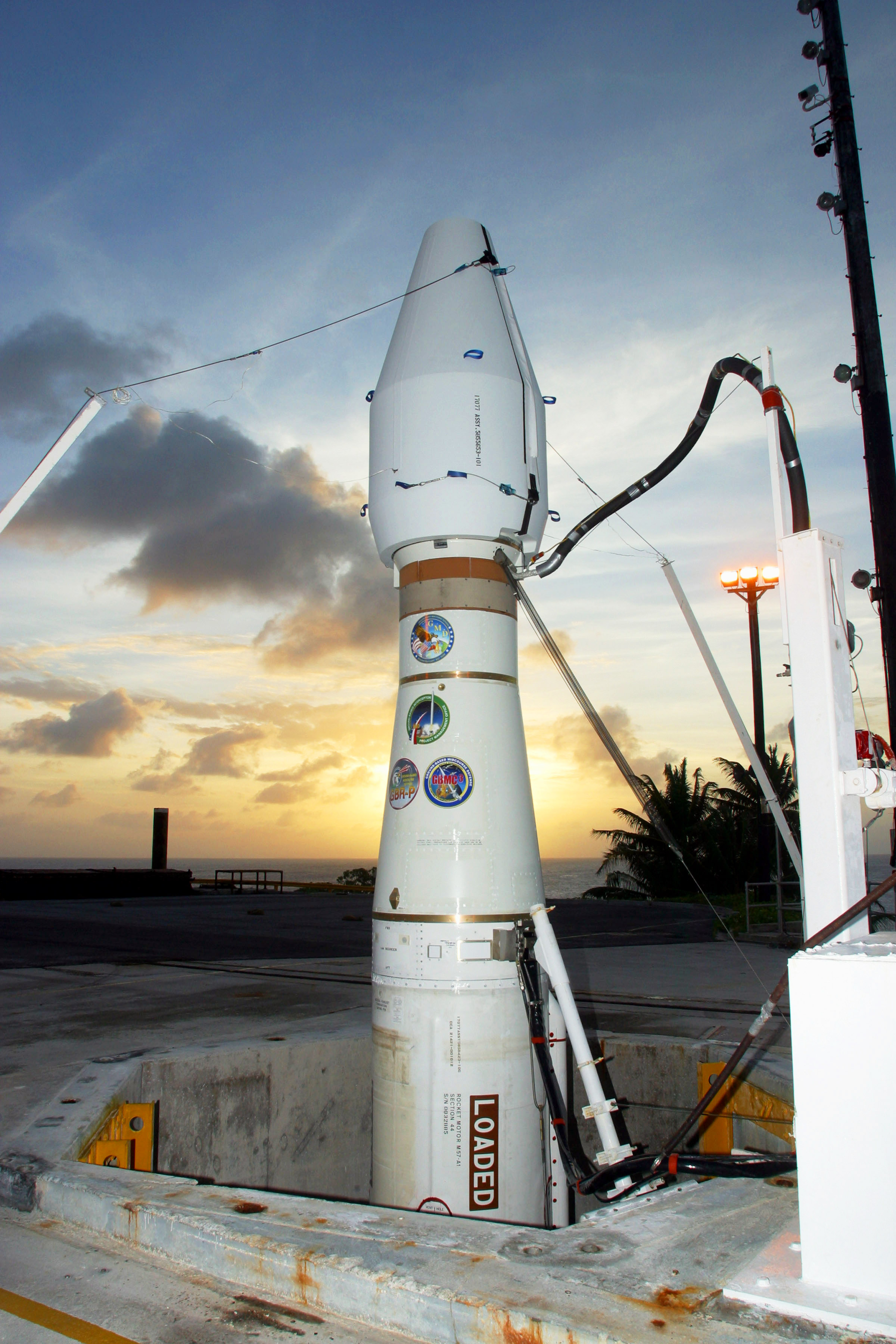
Ground-based Midcourse Defense (GMD) interceptor in launch silo at Vandenberg

The latest missile deployed at Vandenberg in 2005 is the Ground-based Interceptor (GBI) missile suborbital booster for the U.S. Missile Defense Agency's Ground-based Midcourse Defense system's EKV ballistic missile kill vehicle. It is part of a National missile defense system advocated by President George W. Bush. The OBV is under development by Orbital Sciences; for every interceptor missile there is a missile silo and a Silo Interface Vault (SIV), which is an underground electronics room adjacent to the silo. The basic OBV consists of the upper three stages and guidance system from the Taurus orbital launch vehicle (essentially a wingless Pegasus-XL). The developmental OBV is launched from an open pad; the operational version is to be silo-launched.

The first test firing of the OBV took place from former Atlas-F pad 576-E on 6 February 2003. Launch silo LF-23 is used for ongoing silo testing, with target missiles consisting of surplus inert Minuteman ICBM second and third stages being launched from the Kwajalein Meck launch site in the Pacific Range.

===== Early space exploration =====
The world's first polar orbit satellite, Discoverer 1, launched from Vandenberg on 28 February 1959. The launch vehicle for this mission consisted of a Thor-Agena combination. The Discoverer series of satellites provided other significant firsts for Vandenberg. For instance, in August 1960, the data capsule was ejected from Discoverer XIII in orbit and recovered from the Pacific Ocean to become the first man-made object ever retrieved from space. A week later, on 19 August 1960, the descending capsule from Discoverer XIV was snared by an aircraft in flight for the first air recovery in history. Shrouded in a cover story of scientific research, Discoverer was actually the cover name for CORONA, America's first photo reconnaissance satellite program. The publicized Discoverer series came to an end on 13 January 1962 after 38 launches (or launch attempts).

Over the years, satellites of every description and purpose, including international satellites, were placed in orbit from Vandenberg by a widening variety of boosters. Among the parade of newer space boosters are the Titan IV (March 1991), Taurus (March 1994), Pegasus (April 1995), Delta II (February 1996), Atlas IIAS (December 1999), Minotaur (2000), and beginning in late 2005, the Falcon 1, the Delta IV, and Atlas V vehicles.

The most ambitious Air Force endeavors at Vandenberg were the Manned Orbiting Laboratory (MOL) and the Space Shuttle programs. The MOL vehicle consisted of a Titan III booster carrying a modified Gemini space capsule (Gemini B) attached to a space laboratory. Construction work for MOL began at Space Launch Complex-6 (SLC-6) on South Vandenberg in March 1966. President Richard Nixon canceled the estimated US$3 billion program in June 1969, as a result of cost overruns, completion delays, emerging new technologies, and the expense of fighting the Vietnam War. SLC-6 remained closed for the next decade.

===== Space Shuttle =====
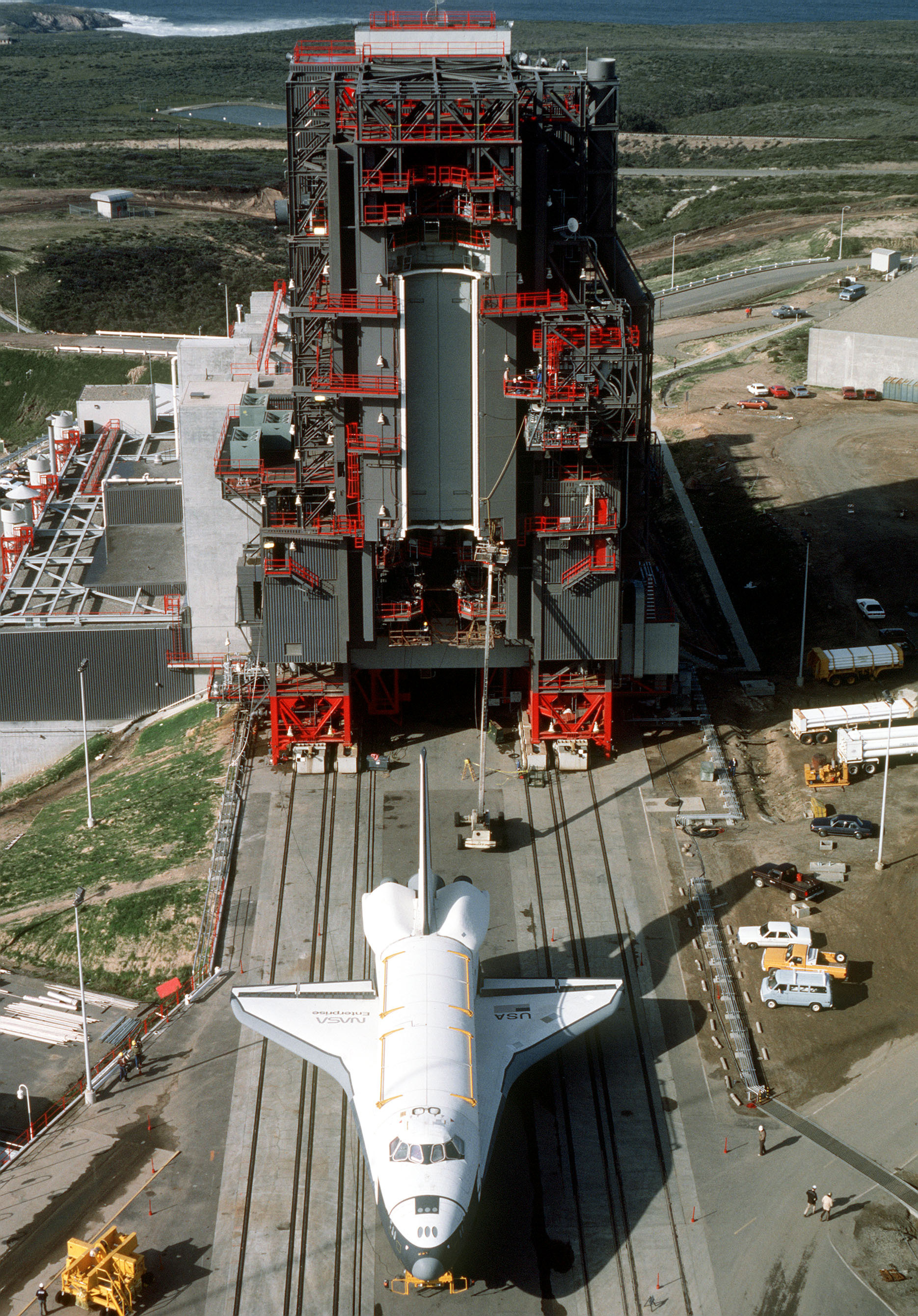
1985 photo of Space Shuttle Enterprise (OV-101) moving toward the shuttle assembly building at Vandenberg Space Launch Complex-6 aboard its specially designed Cometto 76-wheel transporter. In the background are the payload changeout room and the payload preparation room.

In 1972, Vandenberg was selected as the West Coast Space Shuttle launch and landing site, but it was never used as such.

Space Launch Complex-6 (SLC-6, pronounced as "Slick Six"), originally built for the abandoned Manned Orbital Laboratory project, was extensively modified for shuttle operations. Over US$4 billion was spent on the modifications to the complex and construction of associated infrastructure. The original Mobile Service Tower (MST) was lowered in height and two new flame ducts were added for the shuttle's solid rocket boosters. Additional modifications or improvements, included liquid hydrogen and liquid oxygen storage tanks, a payload preparation room, payload changeout room, a new launch tower with escape system for the shuttle crewmembers, sound suppression system and water reclamation area and a Shuttle Assembly Building were added to the original complex.

The existing 8,500-foot (2,590 m) runway and overruns on the North Base flightline were lengthened to 15,000 feet (4,580 m) to accommodate end-of-mission landings, along with construction of the Precision Approach Path Indicator (PAPI) lights/large triangle arrows at both ends of the runway. Turn-around servicing and refurbishing of the Space Shuttle orbiter would be accomplished in the adjacent Orbiter Maintenance and Checkout Facility (OMCF). The Mate-Demate Facility, to load and unload the Orbiter from the Boeing 747 Shuttle Carrier Aircraft (SCA), was changed from the large structure found at Dryden Flight Research Center and Kennedy Space Center, to a transportable "erector set-like" Orbiter Lifting Frame (OLF). This facility design change was due to the possibility of needing to support a landing at a location where there was no facility to load the Orbiter onto the SCA. The OLF could be disassembled, loaded onto two C-5 aircraft, shipped to the overseas Orbiter landing site, and reassembled to load the Orbiter onto the Boeing 747. To transport the Orbiter from the OMCF (on North Vandenberg AFB) to SLC-6, the 22 mi (35 km) route was upgraded to accommodate a 76-wheeled vehicle, built by Commetto in Italy specifically to carry the Orbiter on its large flat deck utilizing the three external tank interface points, versus towing the Orbiter on its landing gear that long distance.

Modification of SLC-6 to support polar missions had been problematic and expensive. SLC-6 was still being prepared for its first Shuttle launch, mission STS-62-A targeted for 15 October 1986, when the Challenger disaster grounded the entire Shuttle fleet and set in motion a chain of events that finally led to the decision to cancel all west coast shuttle launches. The orbiter transporter was sent to Kennedy Space Center in Florida after the Vandenberg AFB launch site was abandoned and was used to transport the Orbiter from the Orbiter Processing Facility to the Vehicle Assembly Building.

Persistent site technical problems and a joint decision by the Air Force and NASA to consolidate Shuttle operations at the Kennedy Space Center, following the Challenger disaster in 1986, resulted in the official termination of the Shuttle program at Vandenberg on 26 December 1989.

Had the space shuttle program been successful at SLC-6, the West Coast operation would have contrasted with that at the Kennedy Space Center by creating the orbiter stack directly on the launch pad, rather than assembling it and then moving it. Three movable buildings on rails, the Launch Tower, Mobile Service Building and Payload Changeout Room were used to assemble the Shuttle orbiter, external tank and SRBs. These buildings were designed to protect the shuttle "stack" from high winds in the area and were used during a series of "fit tests" utilizing the space shuttle Enterprise in 1985.

===== Delta IV =====
After the end of the shuttle program at Vandenberg in 1989, SLC-6 was reconfigured in 1999 to support polar-orbit satellite launches by the new Delta IV family of launch vehicles, utilizing a Common Core Booster for all its class sizes including the Delta IV (Heavy) launcher. After the reconfiguration, the 132 acres (53 ha) launch site included structures similar to those at the Delta IV launch site at Cape Canaveral Space Launch Complex 37 (SLC-37B) in Florida, with a Fixed Umbilical Tower, Mobile Service Tower, Fixed Pad Erector, Launch Control Center and Operations Building, and a Horizontal Integration Facility. SLC-6 also featured a Mobile Assembly Shelter that protects the rocket from adverse weather.

The first of the Delta IV launch vehicles to fly from SLC-6 successfully lifted off at 20:33 PDT on 27 June 2006 when a Delta IV Medium+ (4,2) rocket lofted NROL-22, a classified satellite for the National Reconnaissance Office, into orbit. The payload was successfully deployed approximately 54 minutes later. Ten Delta IVs were launched from SLC-6, with the last launching in 2022 before the site was relinquished to SpaceX.

===== Atlas V =====
The Atlas V was developed by Lockheed Martin as part of the United States Air Force (USAF) Evolved Expendable Launch Vehicle (EELV) program. The Atlas V launches from Space Launch Complex-3E (SLC-3E). Lockheed Martin Commercial Launch Services markets the Atlas V to government and commercial customers worldwide.

The first Atlas V launch vehicle to fly from SLC-3E was launched on 19 March 2008 for the National Reconnaissance Office (NRO).

All Atlas V launches from Vandenberg have been successful.

===== SpaceX Falcon =====
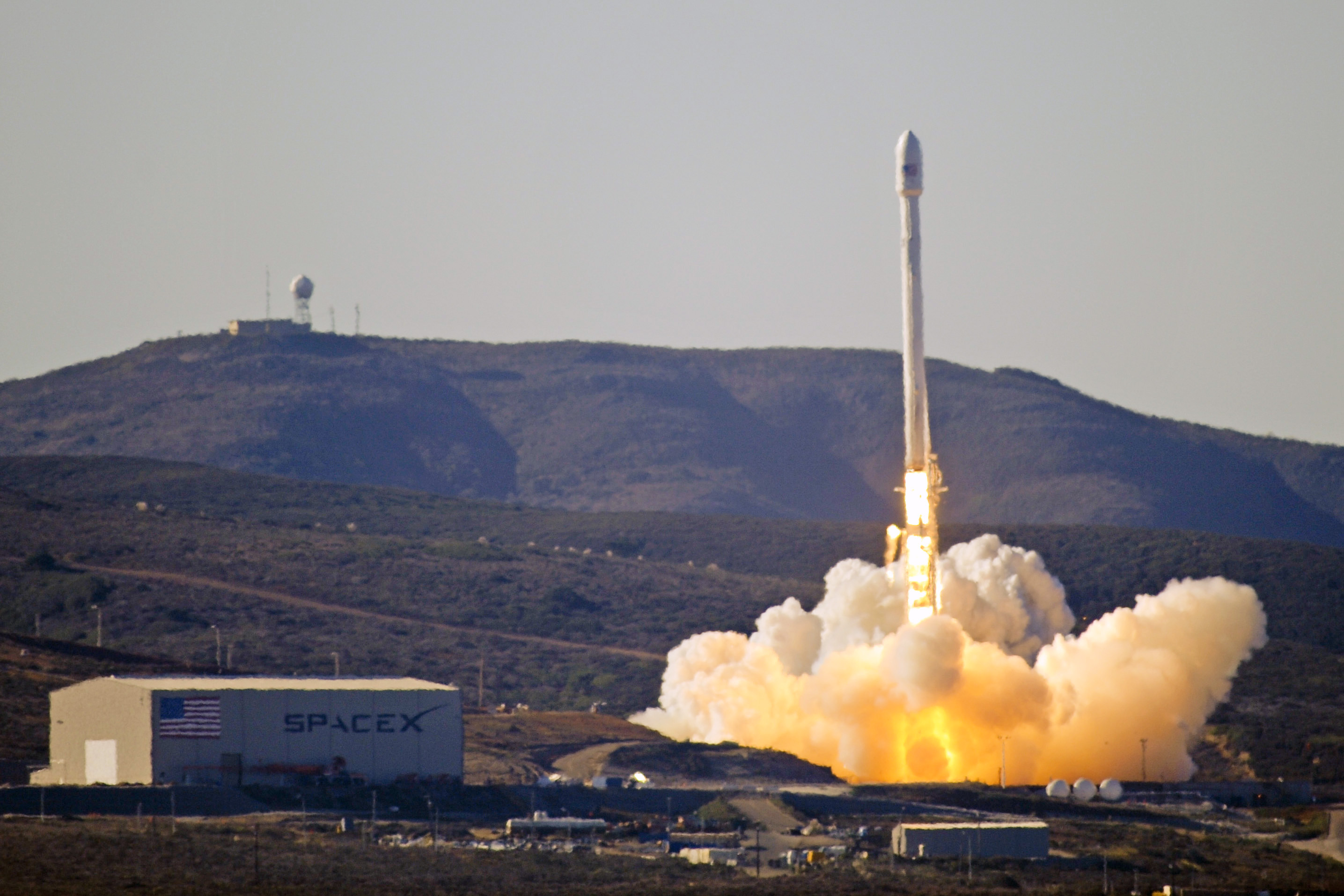
The launch of the first Falcon 9 v1.1 from SLC-4, Vandenberg AFB (Falcon 9 Flight 6) on 29 September 2013

SpaceX briefly used SLC-3W during the early development of the Falcon 1 launch vehicle, and later moved operations to Space Launch Complex 4-East (SLC-4E). SpaceX refurbished SLC-4E for Falcon 9 launches in a 24-month process that began in early 2011. The draft environmental impact assessment with a finding of "no significant impact" was published in February 2011. Demolition began on the pad's fixed and mobile service towers in summer 2011.

By late 2012, SpaceX continued to anticipate that the initial launch from the Vandenberg pad would be in 2013, but would be a Falcon 9 launch—actually a heavily modified and much larger Falcon 9 v1.1. As the pad was nearing completion in February 2013, the first Falcon 9 launch was scheduled for summer 2013 and was finally launched on 29 September 2013. This was the maiden flight of the Falcon 9 v1.1 evolution, carrying Canada's CASSIOPE satellite. In October 2018, SpaceX landed a Falcon 9 booster on a Vandenberg ground pad for the first time.

In April 2023, SpaceX leased SLC-6 at Vandenberg Space Force Base to begin converting it and adding two first stage landing pads for Falcon 9 and Falcon Heavy launches after the last Delta IV launch there. In 2025 SpaceX conducted 64 Falcon 9 launches and plans to launch up to 82 times in 2026, potentially increasing to 100 launches annually in 2027 and 2028.

===== Boeing X-37B =====
The Boeing X-37B, a reusable uncrewed spacecraft operated by the Space Force, also known as the Orbital Test Vehicle (OTV), has landed at Vandenberg in the past. On 3 December 2010, the X-37B spaceplane successfully landed at the base after 224 days in space thus performing the first autonomous orbital landing onto a runway conducted by a U.S. spacecraft. Since then, the X-37B has successfully landed on the 15,000-foot runway at Vandenberg two more times, on 16 June 2012 after 468 days in orbit and again on 14 October 2014 after 674 days in orbit. All of the X-37B missions thus far have been launched from Florida, the first four using expendable Atlas V rockets from Cape Canaveral Space Force Station and the fifth on a reusable SpaceX Falcon 9 from Kennedy Space Center.

==== Major commands to which assigned ====
- Air Research and Development Command, 21 June 1957
- Strategic Air Command, 1 January 1958
- Air Force Space Command, 15 January 1991 – 20 December 2019
- Space Operations Command, 20 December 2019 – present

==== Major units assigned ====
- 1st Strategic Aerospace Division, 16 July 1957 – 1 September 1991
- 392d Strategic Missile Wing, 18 October – 20 December 1961
- Space and Missile Test Center, 1 April 1970 – 1 July 1980
- Air Force Space Test Center, Provisional, 2 January – 15 May 1964
- Air Force Western Test Range, 5 May 1964 – 1 April 1970

Redesignated Western Space and Missile Center, 1 October 1979
Redesignated 30th Space Wing, 1 November 1991 – present

- 704th Strategic Missile Wing (ICBM), 1 July 1957 – 1 July 1959
- 6565th Test Wing, 20 October 1960

Redesignated 6595th Aerospace Test Wing, 1 April 1961 – 1 October 1979

- 10th Aerospace Defense Group, 1 January 1967 – 31 December 1971 (Aerospace Defense Command)
- 30th Launch Group, 1 December 2003 – present
- 30th Operations Group, 19 November 1991 – present
- 6595th Missile Test Group, 1 May 1970 – 1 October 1990
- 6595th Space (later Satellite, later Aerospace) Test Group, 1 May 1970 – 1 October 1990
- 6595th Space Transportation (later Shuttle) Test Group, 21 May 1979 – 30 September 1987
- 2d Space Launch Squadron, 19 November 1991 – 31 October 2005; 1 June 2019 – present
- 4th Space Launch Squadron, 15 April 1994 – 29 June 1998; 1 December 2003 – 31 May 2019
- 10th Aerospace Defense Squadron, 15 November 1963 – 1 January 1967; 31 December 1970 – 1 November 1979
- 394th Missile Testing Squadron (ICBM-Atlas), 1 April – 15 December 1958
- 394th Strategic Missile Squadron (ICBM-Titan), 1 July 1960 – 30 June 1976

Redesignated 394th Test Maintenance Squadron, 1 July 1976
Redesignated 394th Operational Missile Maintenance Squadron, 1 September 1991
Redesignated 394th Field Missile Maintenance Squadron, 1 September 1994 – present

- 395th Strategic Missile Squadron (ICBM-Titan), 1 February 1959 – 31 December 1969
- 576th Strategic Missile Squadron (ICBM-Atlas), 1 April 1958 – 2 April 1966

Redesignated 576th Flight Test Squadron, 1 September 1991 – present
Assigned to Air Force Global Strike Command, 1 December 2009 – present

- 644th Strategic Missile Squadron, 15 January – 1 November 1959
- 670th Aircraft Control and Warning Squadron, 5 May 1950 – 2 August 1951
- 4315th Combat Crew Training Squadron, 1 May 1958 – 15 January 1991

=== United States Space Force ===
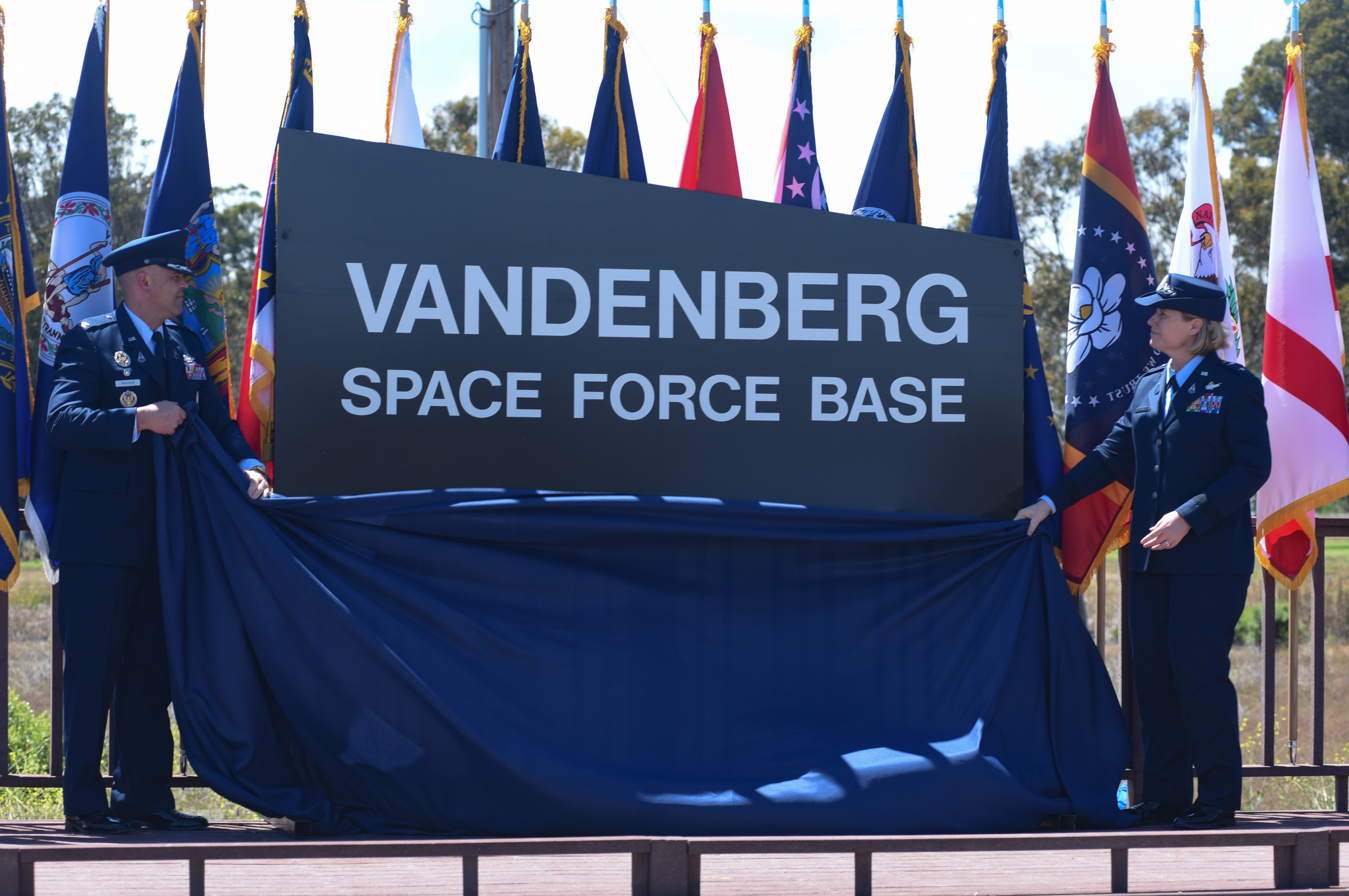
Vandenberg's redesignation as a Space Force installation

On 14 May 2021, the base was renamed Vandenberg Space Force Base, in keeping with the expansion and standing up of the Space Force.

As of March 2025, the Space Force has activated the Site Activation Task Force (SATAF) Detachment to modernize the nation's nuclear defence capabilities, preparing to replace the Minuteman III ICBM fleet with the newly developed LGM-35A Sentinel.

== Role and operations ==
Launch sites at Vandenberg Space Force Base
Active pads
Active pads not used for launches
Inactive leased pads
Inactive unleased pads
1 SLC-1E
2 SLC-1W
3 SLC-2E
4 SLC-2W
5 SLC-10E
6 SLC-10W
7 LC-576E
8 SLC-9
9 SLC-3E
10 SLC-3W
11 SLC-4E
12 SLC-4W (LZ-4)
13 SLC-5
14 SLC-6
15 SLC-8
16 SLC-7
17 SLC-11
18 SLC-12
19 SLC-14
20 SLC-15

The host unit at Vandenberg SFB is the Space Launch Delta 30 (SLD 30). The unit oversees the Western Range, a vast testing area stretching from Vandenberg's coast westward to the Western Pacific, including sites in Hawaii. This range facilitates Department of Defense space and missile testing, including launches that place satellites into near-polar orbits. Their operations involve collaboration with a multitude of federal agencies and commercial partners.

SLD 30 is organized into operations, mission support and medical groups, along with several directly assigned staff agencies:

- 30th Operations Group

The 30th Operations Group provides the core capability for West Coast spacelift and range operations. The group is responsible for operating and maintaining the Western Range for spacelift, missile test launch, aeronautical and space surveillance missions.

- 30th Mission Support Group

The 30th Mission Support Group is responsible for quality-of-life needs on the base, including, housing, personnel, services, civil engineering, contracting and security.

- 30th Medical Group

The 30th Medical Group provides medical, dental, bio-environmental and public health services for the base.

=== Space and Missile Technology Center (SAMTEC) ===
The Space and Missile Technology Center (SAMTEC), also known as the Vandenberg Space Museum, preserves and displays artifacts and memorabilia to interpret the evolution of missile and spacelift activity at Vandenberg from the beginning of the Cold War through current military, commercial, and scientific space endeavors."Space and Missile Technology Center". Vandenberg Space Force Base. It is operated under Space Launch Delta 30.Karim, Rubaiya (25 June 2025). "Vandenberg Space Museum Relocates to Marshallia Ranch to Inspire Future Generations". Edhat. The museum's exhibits focus on 1950s and 1960s space and missile operations, including Thor, Atlas, and Titan ICBMs, as well as the CORONA satellite program.

The center was historically located within the main base perimeter at Space Launch Complex 10, the site of early IRBM tests of the Thor"Space Launch Complex 10". National Park Service. which launched the Discoverer (aka CORONA) spy satellite series.Foley, Theresa (1 September 1995). "Corona Comes in From the Cold". Air and Space Forces Magazine. In June 2025, the museum relocated off the main base campus to the former Marshallia Ranch Clubhouse at 1335 San Antonio Road West in Lompoc. The relocation to the former golf course clubhouse made the museum significantly more accessible to the general public without requiring base security screening or pre-arranged base tours.

== Based units ==
Notable units based at Vandenberg Space Force Base. Units marked GSU are Geographically Separate Units, which although based at Vandenberg, are subordinate to a parent unit based at another location.

=== United States Space Force ===
Space Systems Command (SSC)

- Space Launch Delta 30 (SLD 30)
  - Headquarters Space Launch Delta 30
  - 30th Comptroller Squadron
  - 30th Operations Group
    - 2nd Space Launch Squadron
    - 30th Operations Support Squadron
    - 30th Space Communications Squadron
    - 30th Launch Support Squadron
  - 30th Medical Group
    - 30th Medical Operations Squadron
    - 30th Medical Support Squadron
  - 30th Mission Support Group
    - 30th Civil Engineer Squadron
    - 30th Contracting Squadron
    - 30th Force Support Squadron
    - 30th Logistics Readiness Squadron
    - 30th Security Forces Squadron

United States Space Forces – Space (S4S)

- Space Delta 5

Space Training and Readiness Command (STARCOM)

- Space Delta 1
  - 1st Delta Operations Squadron
  - 533rd Training Squadron

United States Space Force Combat Forces Command (CFC)

- Space Delta 6
  - 21st Space Operations Squadron (GSU)
  - 65th Cyberspace Squadron
- Space Delta 7
  - 72 ISRS, Det 2

=== United States Air Force ===
Air Education and Training Command (AETC)

- Second Air Force
  - 381st Training Group
    - 81st Training Support Squadron
    - 532rd Training Squadron

Air Force Global Strike Command (AFGSC)

- 576th Flight Test Squadron

=== Air National Guard ===
California Air National Guard

- 195th Wing
  - 195th Operations Group
    - 148th Space Operations Squadron (GSU)
    - 216th Space Control Squadron (GSU)

=== Department of Defense ===
United States Space Command

- Combined Joint Force Space Component Commander
  - Combined Space Operations Center

== Geography ==
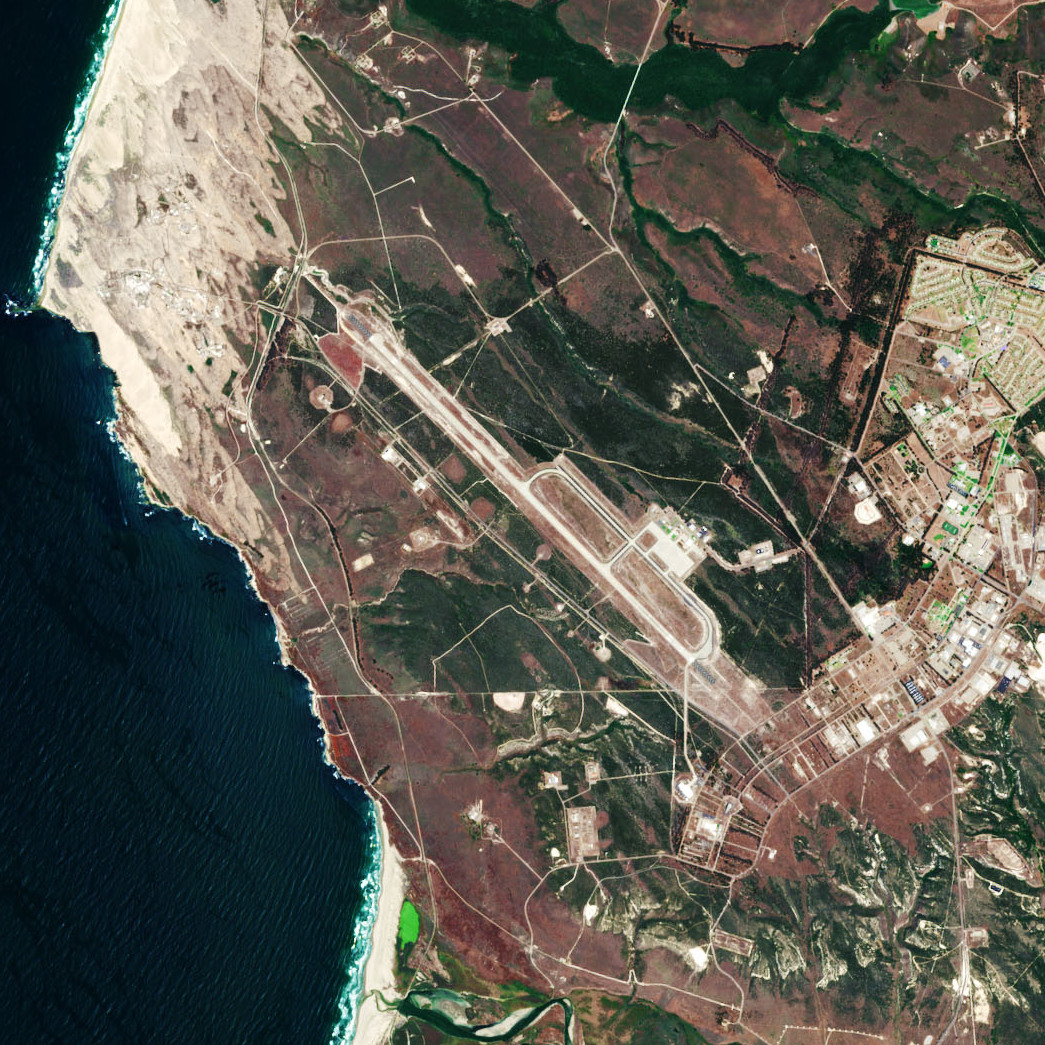
The base as seen by the European Space Agency's Sentinel-2 in August 2020

Much of the base is rugged, mountainous, and undeveloped; predominant groundcover includes chaparral with coastal sage scrub and oak woodland. Because of its protected nature—none of the backcountry areas are open to the public or to any kind of development—the base contains some of the highest quality coastal habitat remaining in southern or central California. It is home to numerous threatened or endangered species, including Gambel's watercress (Nasturtium gambellii). The western terminus of the Santa Ynez Mountains is on the base, and is dominated by Tranquillion Peak, which rises 2,297 ft (700 m) above sea level. An optical tracking station is located at the top of the peak, which overlooks the various space launch complexes. The Amtrak Coast Starlight and Pacific Surfliner trains travel along the coast, providing a splendid view and one of the few ways for the public to see these remote areas. Conversely, State Route 1, California's Pacific Coast Highway, avoids these coastal protected areas and instead turns inland to serve the base's eastern side. The Breeze Bus provides service between the base, Santa Maria, and Lompoc.

=== Beaches ===
Surf Beach is open to the public, while Wall and Minuteman beaches are restricted to those with regular access to the base. Sections of these three beaches are closed between 1 March and 30 September every year during the nesting season of the Western Snowy Plover. The closures are in place to protect the bird under the Endangered Species Act. If a set number of trespass violations have been reached during any nesting season (50 for Surf, 10 for Wall, 10 for Minuteman), the beach is closed entirely.

Surf Beach is adjacent to the Surf Amtrak station, just south of Ocean Beach Park, run by the Santa Barbara County Parks Division. On 22 October 2010, 19-year-old Lucas Ransom, a University of California, Santa Barbara (UCSB) student, was killed by a great white shark near Surf Beach. On 23 October 2012, 38-year-old Francisco Javier Solorio Jr. was killed by a shark near Ocean Beach.

=== Wildlife ===
Snowy plovers nest on the beach.

== Demographics ==
Vandenberg Space Force Base
- Census-designated place
- Location within California Location within the United States
- Country: United States
- State: California
- County: Santa Barbara
- Elevation: 505 ft (154 m)

Population (2020)
  - Total: 3,559
- Time zone: UTC-8 (Pacific)
  - Summer (DST): UTC-7 (PDT)
- GNIS feature ID: 2409501

The United States Census Bureau has designated Vandenberg Space Force Base as a separate census-designated place (CDP) for statistical purposes, covering the base's residential population. Per the 2020 census, the population was 3,559. The CDP was formerly known as Vandenberg Air Force Base, reflecting the base's former name.

Historical population
Census	Pop.	Note	%±
1970	13,193		—
1980	8,136		−38.3%
1990	9,846		21.0%
2000	6,151		−37.5%
2010	3,338		−45.7%
2020	3,559		6.6%
U.S. Decennial Census; 1850–1870 1880-1890; 1900 1910 1920; 1930 1940 1950; 1960 1970 1980; 1990 2000 2010 2020

Vandenberg SFB CDP, California – Racial and ethnic composition Note: the US Census treats Hispanic/Latino as an ethnic category. This table excludes Latinos from the racial categories and assigns them to a separate category. Hispanics/Latinos may be of any race.
Race / Ethnicity	Pop 2000	Pop 2010	Pop 2020	% 2000	% 2010	% 2020
White alone	4,198	2,005	1,851	68.25%	60.07%	52.01%
Black or African American alone	686	285	314	11.15%	8.54%	8.82%
Native American or Alaska Native alone	25	8	14	0.41%	0.24%	0.39%
Asian alone	233	197	215	3.79%	5.90%	6.04%
Pacific Islander alone	40	20	36	0.65%	0.60%	1.01%
Other Race alone	23	9	20	0.37%	0.27%	0.56%
Mixed Race or Multi-Racial	263	198	309	4.28%	5.93%	8.68%
Hispanic or Latino (any race)	683	616	800	11.10%	18.45%	22.48%
Total	6,151	3,338	3,559	100%	100%	100%

== Education ==
Dependent children living on-post are assigned to schools in the Lompoc Unified School District. The assigned elementary school is on-post, the middle school is adjacent to the base, and the high school is in Vandenberg Village. The schools are Crestview Elementary School, Vandenberg Middle School, and Cabrillo High School.

== See also ==
- Point Arguello Light
- Canyon Fire – a 2016 wildfire that burned over 12,500 acres (51 km^{2}) on the base.
