= 394th Strategic Missile Squadron =

394th Strategic Missile Squadron (Later 377th Flight Test Missile Maintenance Squadron)
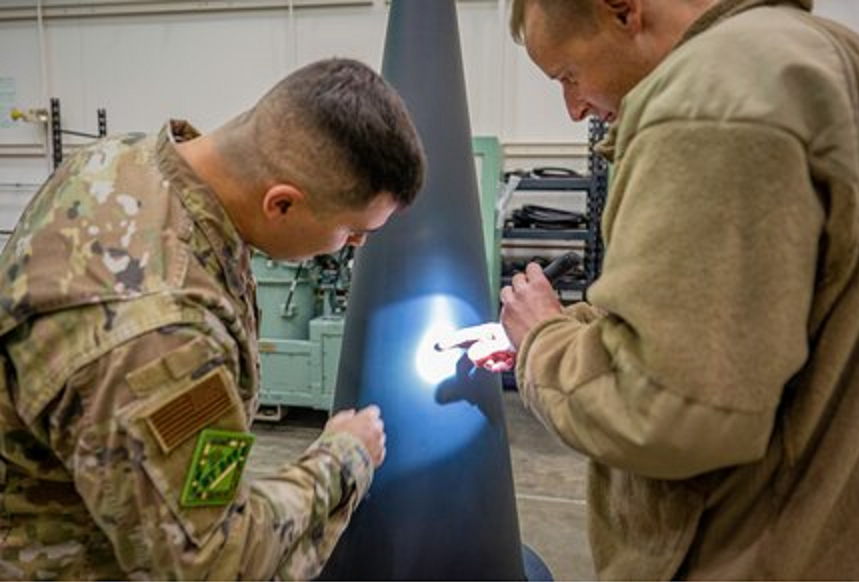
- 377th Missile Test Maintenance Squadron members test Mark 21 reentry vehicle
- Active: 1958; 1960–1994; 2022–present
- Country: United States
- Branch: United States Air Force
- Role: intercontinental ballistic missile maintenance
- Part of: Air Force Global Strike Command
- Garrison/HQ: Vandenberg Space Force Base
- Decorations: Air Force Outstanding Unit Award; Air and Space Outstanding Unit Award

Insignia
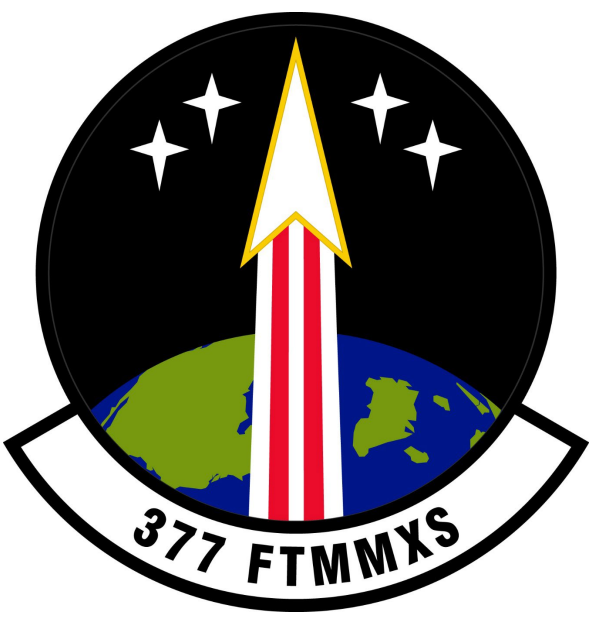
- 377th Flight Test Missile Maintenance Squadron emblem (Note: Approved 22 August 2024.)

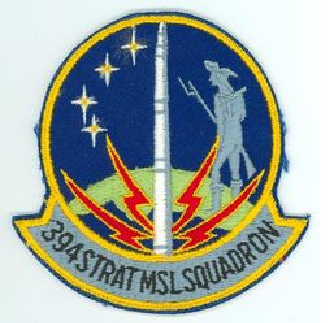
- Patch with 394th Strategic Missile Squadron emblem

The 377th Flight Test Maintenance Squadron is an active United States Air Force unit assigned to the 377th Test and Evaluation Group at Vandenberg Space Force Base, California, where it supports test and evaluation of LGM-30 Minuteman and LGM-35 Sentinel missiles. The squadron was first active during 1958 as the 394th Missile Training Squadron, training missile personnel for intercontinental ballistic missiles. It was activated again in 1960 as the 394th Strategic Missile Squadron, and continued training with more modern missiles. In 1976, its mission changed to maintaining missiles used for testing, becoming the 394th Intercontinental Ballistics Missile Test Maintenance Squadron. It became the 394th Maintenance Support Squadron in 1991, and was inactivated in 1993. It was reactivated in 2022 with its current name and mission.

== Mission ==
The squadron provides maintenance support for intercontinental ballistic missile initial operational test and evaluation and force development evaluation programs. It supports ground and flight tests to collect, analyze, and report performance, accuracy, and reliability data for the Joint Staff, United States Strategic Command, the Air Staff and Air Force Global Strike Command.

== History ==
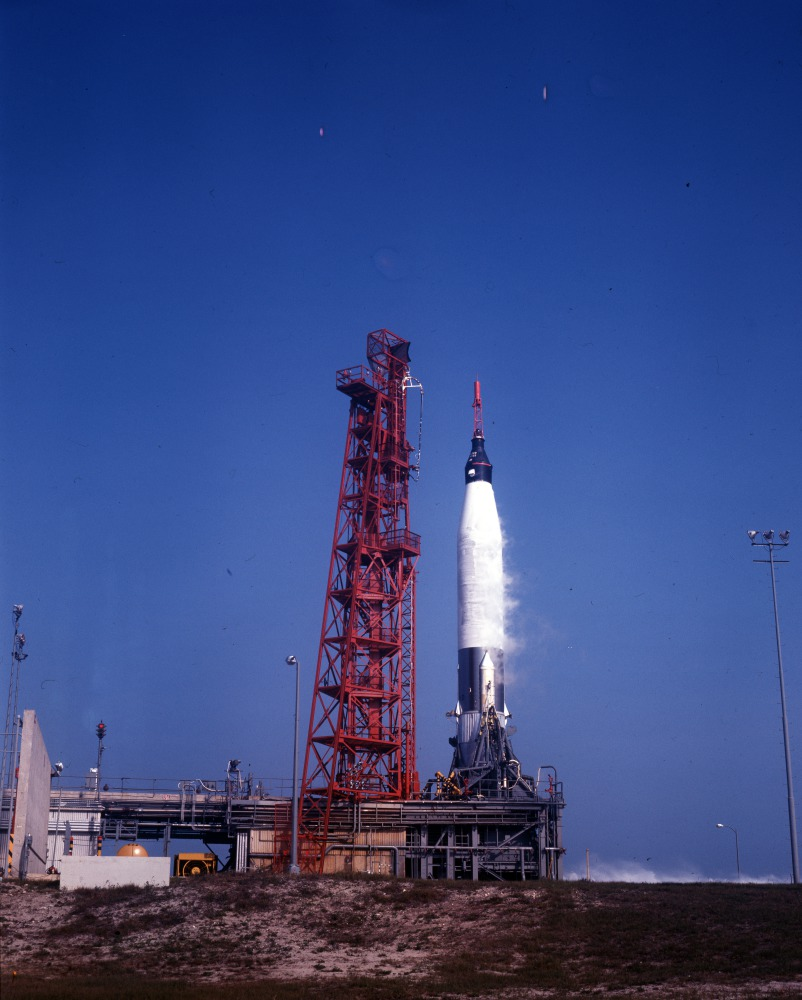
Atlas missile preparing for launch

The squadron was first activated at Vandenberg Air Force Base, California in April 1958 as the 394th Missile Training Squadron and assigned to the 704th Strategic Missile Wing. Its mission was to conduct training for SM-65 Atlas intercontinental ballistic missile operations and maintenance.s. In December of that year, the squadron and the 392d Missile Training Squadron, which was the training unit at Vandenberg for intermediate range ballistic missiles, were inactivated and replaced by a single training squadron, the 576th Strategic Missile Squadron.

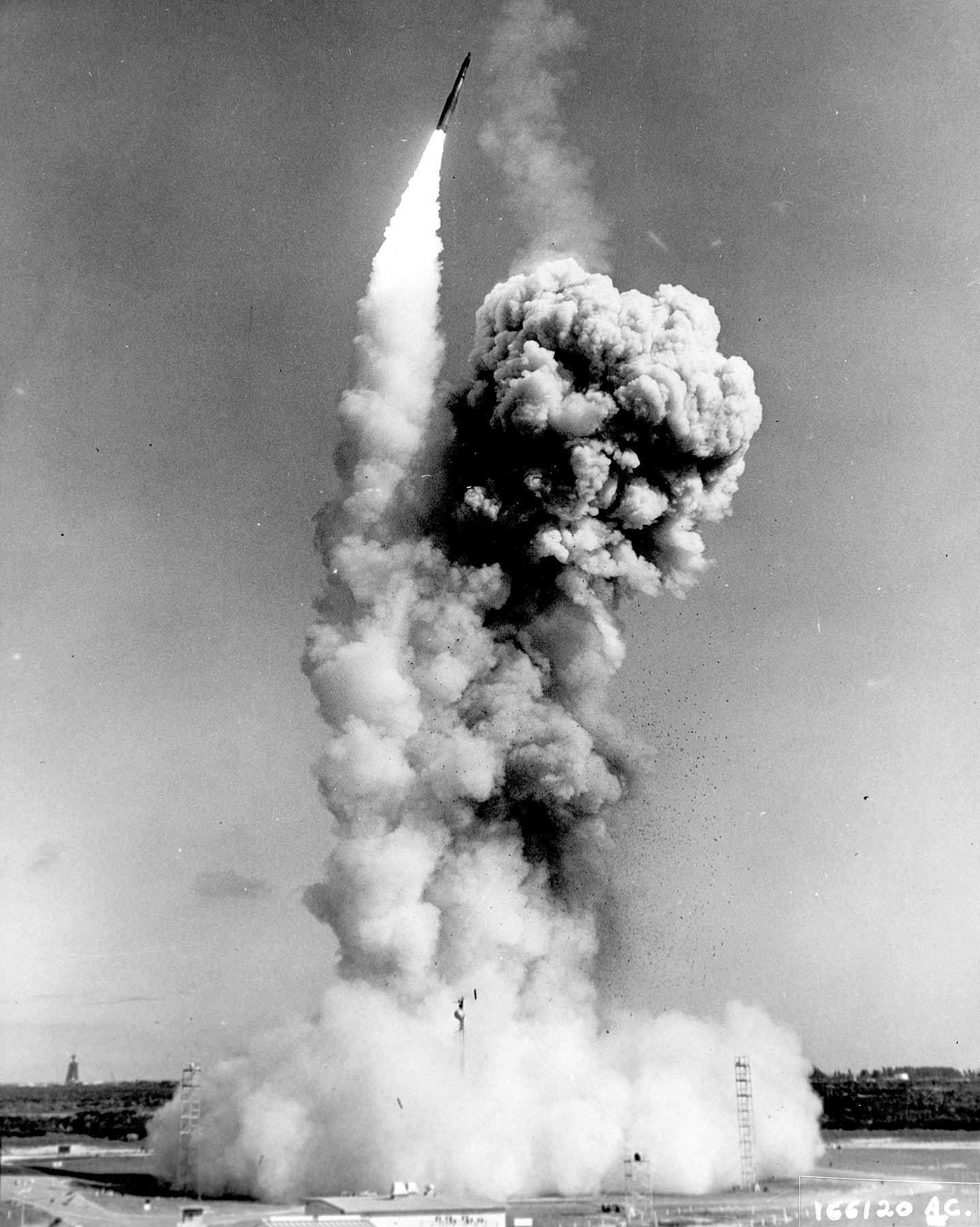
Minuteman I test launch

The squadron was organized at Vandenberg a second time in July 1960 as the 394th Strategic Missile Squadron and assigned to the 1st Missile Division. It acted as the training unit for LGM-30 Minuteman missiles. The squadron supported all LGM-30 Minuteman test launches. In 1976, its mission shifted to maintenance support for missile testing, and it became the 394th Intercontinental Ballistics Missile Test Maintenance Squadron.

In September 1991, when the Air Force reorganized under the Objective Wing system, the squadron became the 394th Maintenance Support Squadron, and was reassigned to the 310th Maintenance Group. When the 30th Space Wing became the single wing at Vandenberg in 1993, the squadron was transferred to the wing's 30th Maintenance Group. A year later, it was inactivated, and its functions were transferred to the 30th Logistics Support Squadron.

Operational missile testing at Vandenberg had been conducted by the 576th Flight Test Squadron since 1991. Air Force Global Strike Command determined that with the development of the LGM-35 Sentinel missile, the 576th needed expansion, and activated the 377th Test and Evaluation Group. The 394th Squadron was redesignated the 377th Flight Test Missile Maintenance Squadron and again activated at Vandenberg in November 2022 to assume the maintenance functions required by Minuteman and Sentinel testing.

== Lineage ==
- Constituted on 6 March 1958 as the 394th Missile Training Squadron (ICBM)

Activated on 1 April 1958
Inactivated 15 December 1958

- Redesignated 394th Missile Training Squadron (ICBM-Minuteman) and activated on 10 June 1960 (not organized)
- Organized on 1 July 1960
- Redesignated 394th Strategic Missile Squadron (ICBM-Minuteman) on 1 February 1964
- Redesignated 394th Intercontinental Ballistics Missile Test Maintenance Squadron on 1 July 1976
- Redesignated 394th Maintenance Support Squadron on 1 September 1991

Inactivated on 1 July 1994

- Redesignated 377th Flight Test Missile Maintenance Squadron on 4 October 2022
- Activated on 1 November 2022

=== Assignments ===
- 704th Strategic Missile Wing: 1 April 1958 – 15 December 1958
- 1st Missile Division: 1 July 1960
- 392d Strategic Missile Wing: 18 October 1961
- 1st Strategic Air Division (later Strategic Missile Center): 20 December 1961
- 310th Maintenance Group: 1 September 1991
- 30th Logistics Group: 1 July 1993 – 1 July 1994
- 377th Test and Evaluation Group: 1 November 2022 – present

=== Stations ===
- Vandenberg Air Force Base, 1 July 1958 – 15 December 1958
- Vandenberg Air Force Base, 1 April 1960 – c. 1 July 1993
- Vandenberg Space Force Base, 1 November 2022 – present

=== Missiles ===
- SM-65 Atlas (1958)
- LGM-30 Minuteman I (1960–1976)

=== Decorations ===
Award streamer	Award	Dates	Notes
	Air Force Outstanding Unit Award	1 July 1963–30 June 1965	394th Strategic Missile Squadron
	Air Force Outstanding Unit Award	1 January 1970–30 June 1971	394th Strategic Missile Squadron
	Air Force Outstanding Unit Award	1 July 1974–30 June 1976	394th Strategic Missile Squadron
	Air Force Outstanding Unit Award	1 July 1977–30 June 1979	394th ICBM Test Maintenance Squadron
	Air Force Outstanding Unit Award	1 July 1982–30 June 1983	394th ICBM Test Maintenance Squadron
	Air Force Outstanding Unit Award	1 July 1984–30 June 1986	394th ICBM Test Maintenance Squadron
	Air Force Outstanding Unit Award	1 July 1986–30 June 1988	394th ICBM Test Maintenance Squadron
	Air Force Outstanding Unit Award	1 September 1991–15 May 1993	394th Maintenance Support Squadron
	Air Force Outstanding Unit Award	1 November 1991–30 September 1993	394th Maintenance Support Squadron
	Air and Space Outstanding Unit Award	1 January 2023–31 December 2023	377th Flight Test Missile Maintenance Squadron
