= 417th Bombardment Squadron =

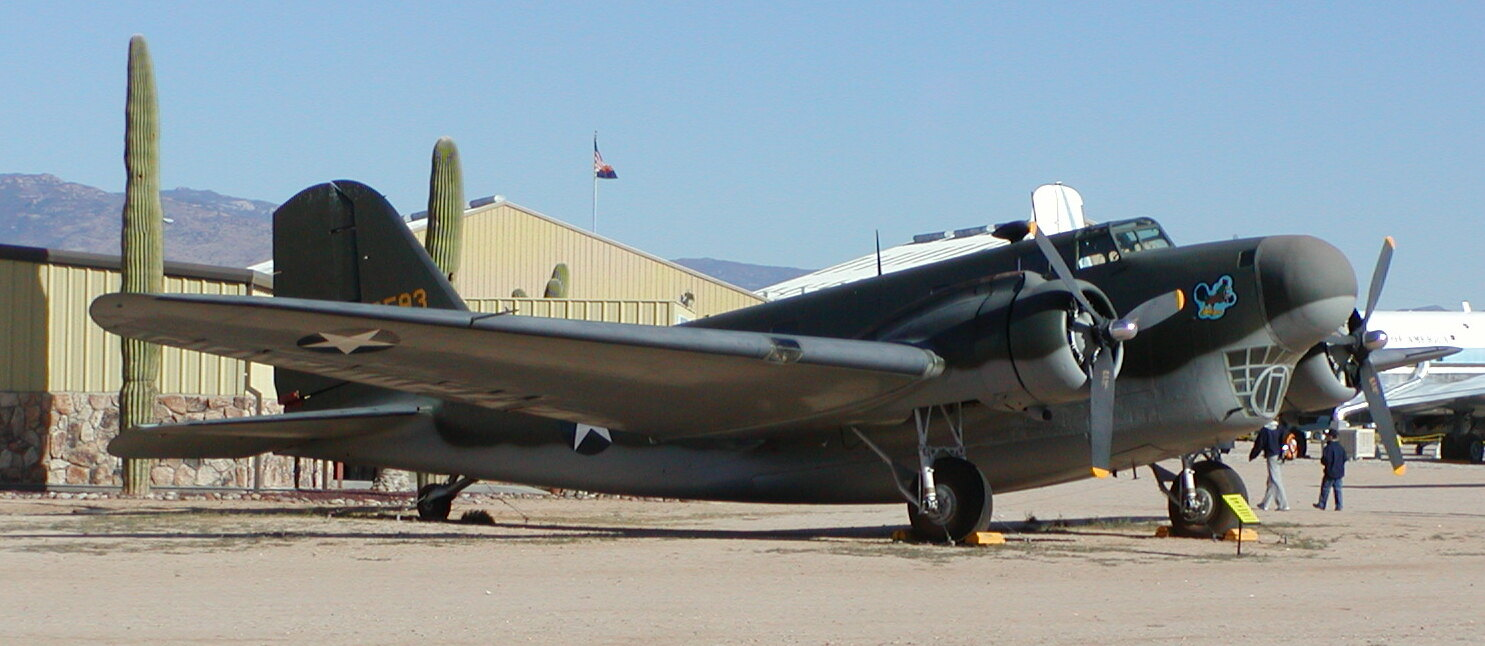
- B-18B Bolo with nose radome
- Active: 1939–1944
- Country: United States
- Branch: United States Air Force
- Role: Medium bomber
- Engagements: American Theater: Antisubmarine Campaign

Insignia
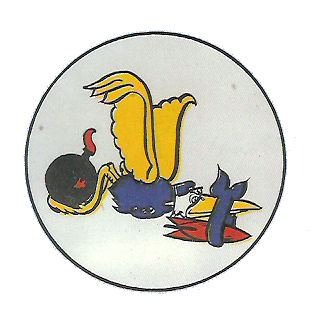
- 417th Bombardment Squadron emblem (Note: Approved 13 January 1943. Description: On a white disc, bordure black, a caricatured stork in flight, yellow wings, beak, and feet, wearing a blue jacket and cap, trimmed white, holding a large black bomb fired proper in the feet, and carrying a large red aerial bomb suspended from the beak by a blue cloth.)

The 417th Bombardment Squadron was a United States Army Air Forces unit. It was activated in the fall of 1939 as the 27th Reconnaissance Squadron and moved to Puerto Rico two months later. Following the attack on Pearl Harbor it engaged in antisubmarine patrols in the Caribbean until the antisubmarine mission was taken over by the Navy. In the spring of 1944, it returned to the United States, where it was disbanded on 20 June 1944.

== History ==
The squadron was first organized in September 1939 the 27th Reconnaissance Squadron (Long Range) at Langley Field, Virginia, and assigned to the new Puerto Rican Department, which had been organized in July. Drawing its personnel from various organizations stationed at Langley, the squadron's ground echelon embarked on the USAT Chateau Thierry bound for Puerto Rico on 17 November 1939, arriving at Borinquen Field, Puerto Rico on 21 November. The air echelon, with nine Douglas B-18A Bolo bombers, arrived on 5 December.

Borinquen was a newly opened field and, in addition to flying training flights, squadron members engaged in making their quarters more livable. In November 1940, the 25th Bombardment Group arrived, and the squadron was attached to it. As the military garrison at Borrinquen grew, the squadron provided the cadre for the 5th Reconnaissance Squadron, which was activated on 1 April 1941 and continued training the 5th until it began independent operations in September.

After the Pearl Harbor Attack, Flight A of the squadron deployed to Camaguey Airfield, Cuba in April 1942, from which it patrolled the Old Bahama Channel until August 1943, except for a brief period in May 1942.

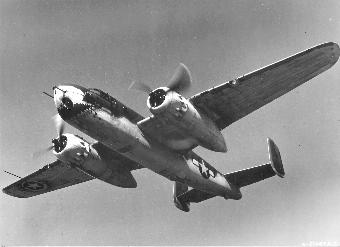
B-25 Mitchel in antisubmarine camouflage

On 22 April 1942, the squadron was redesignated as the 417th Bombardment Squadron. The squadron moved to Vernam Field, Jamaica on 24 September 1942, and in December, established a detachment at Dakota Field, Aruba. It returned to Puerto Rico on 29 May 1943, but to Losey Field, near Ponce. Simultaneously the Camaguey detachment was discontinued At Losey, the squadron began transitioning to the North American B-25 Mitchell, as the threat from German submarines in the Caribbean had diminished as the Kriegsmarine shifted its operations to the North Atlantic., while the Navy assumed the antisubmarine patrols the squadron had been performing. In June 1943, the Army Air Forces had agreed to withdraw from antisubmarine operation as soon as the Navy was able to perform the mission.

In April 1944 the squadron returned to the United States and was disbanded on 20 June, with most of its personnel used to form cadres for heavy bomber units being formed by Second Air Force.

== Lineage ==
- Constituted as the 27th Reconnaissance Squadron (Long Range) on 16 September 1939 and activated

Redesignated 27th Reconnaissance Squadron (Heavy) on 20 November 1940
Redesignated 417th Bombardment Squadron (Heavy) on 22 April 1942
Redesignated 417th Bombardment Squadron (Medium) on 7 May 1942
Disbanded on 20 June 1944

=== Assignments ===
- Puerto Rican Department, 16 September 1939 (attached to 25th Bombardment Group after c. 5 November 1940)

25th Bombardment Group: 25 February 1942 – 20 June 1944 (Note: Maurer dates the assignment to the 25th Group to 25 February 1944 in Combat Squadrons, which appears to be a typographical error (omitting the year in the from date), because in Combat Units, he gives the beginning of the assignment as 1942 (year only).)

=== Stations ===
- Langley Field, Virginia, 16 September–17 November 1939
- Borinquen Field, Puerto Rico, 21 November 1939 (detachment operated from Camaguey Airfield, Cuba, 13 April 1942 – August 1943)
- Vernam Field, Jamaica, 24 September 1942
- Losey Field, Puerto Rico, 29 May 1943 – 24 March 1944
- Alamogordo Army Air Field, New Mexico, April 1944 – 20 June 1944

=== Aircraft ===
- Douglas B-18 Bolo, 1939–1943 (Note: Maurer indicates B-18 use continued into 1944 in the entry for the squadron in Combat Squadrons of the Air Force in World War II. However the entry for the 25th Bombardment Group in Air Force Combat Units in World War II indicates B-18s had left the group in 1943 in favor of the B-25.)
- North American B-25 Mitchell, 1943–1944

=== Campaigns ===
Campaign Streamer	Campaign	Dates	Notes
	Antisubmarine	7 December 1941 – 1 August 1943	
