= 30th Mission Support Group =

Support group of the United States Air Force

The 30th Mission Support Group was a support group of the United States Air Force, and later United States Space Force, part of the 30th Space Wing at Vandenberg Air Force Base, California. The group's predecessor, the 4392nd Aerospace Support Group and Wing, was the principal base operating unit for Vandeberg AFB from 1961 onwards. The unit was inactivated on 14 May 2021.

It was originally established as the 30 Air Base Group, Depot, on 10 Nov 1950, and activated on 16 November 1950, as part of the 30th Air Depot Wing. It was then inactivated on 8 Jul 1953, and then disestablished on 27 Sep 1984. The group was reestablished, and consolidated, on 1 November 1991, with the 4392nd Aerospace Support Wing, which was established, and organized, on 21 July 1961. The 4392 ASW was then redesignated as:

- 4392 Aerospace Support Group on 20 December 1961;
- 4392 Aerospace Support Wing on 1 July 1987;
- 30 Support Group on 19 November 1991;
- 30 Mission Support Group on 1 October 2002.

In early 2021, the 30th Mission Support Group consisted of the:

- 30th Civil Engineer Squadron (30 CES)
- 30th Contracting Squadron (30 CONS)
- 30th Force Support Squadron (30 FSS)
- 30th Logistics Readiness Squadron (30 LRS)
- 30th Security Forces Squadron (30 SFS)

== Assignments ==
- 30th Air Depot Wing, 16 Nov 1950 – 8 Jul 1953.
- 1st Strategic Aerospace Division (later, Strategic Missile Center), 21 Jul 1961;
- Western Space and Missile Center (later, 30th Space Wing), 15 Jan 1991-present.

== Stations ==
- Kelly Air Force Base, TX, 16 Nov 1950 – 17 Jan 1951;
- RAF Burtonwood, United Kingdom, 4 Feb 1951;
- RAF Burtonwood-Sealand, UK, 20 Apr 1951;
- RAF Brize Norton England, 27 Jan 1952 – 8 Jul 1953.
- Vandenberg AFB, CA, 21 Jul 1961-.
