= Babus =

Babus بابوس
- village
- Location within Afghanistan
- Coordinates: 34°04′45″N 068°58′45″E
- Country: Afghanistan
- Province: Logar Province
- Rural District: Pul-i Alam District
- Time zone: UTC+4:30 (IRST)
  - Summer (DST): UTC+5:30 (IRDT)

Bābūs (Pashto: بابوس Dari: بابوس) is a village in Pul-i Alam District, Logar province, Afghanistan.

== Etymology ==
Bābūs is made up of the Persian word Bāb (باب) meaning "father" and the Pashto word was (وس) which ultimately stems from Sanskrit वस meaning "dwell", making the meaning "father's dwelling".
