= Vernam Field =

US Army airfield in Jamaica

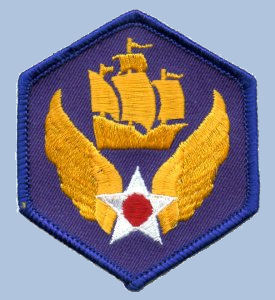
Vernam Field Vernam Air Force Base
- Part of Sixth Air Force
- Located in Clarendon Parish, Jamaica

Site information
- Type: Military airfield
- Controlled by: United States Army Air Forces; United States Air Force

Location
- Location of Vernam AFB, Jamaica
- Coordinates: 17°53′26.75″N 077°18′07.68″W

Site history
- Built: 1941
- In use: 1941-1949

Vernam Field (locally spelled Vernamfield) is a former World War II United States Army Air Forces airfield located in Clarendon Parish, 34.3 miles (55.2 km) west-southwest of Kingston, Jamaica. The airfield was renamed Vernam Air Force Base by the newly formed United States Air Force in 1948, but was closed in 1949.

== History ==
The base was named in honour of First Lieutenant Remington de Bremont Vernam (March 24, 1896 – December 1, 1918), an American pilot who entered the French air service during World War I. Vernam was shot down behind German lines on October 30, 1918. After the Armistice he was found by American forces in a hospital in Longwey, France, with another wounded aviator, Lt. Arthur C. Dineen. Vernam died of his wounds on December 1. He is buried in the American cemetery at St. Mihiel in Thiaucourt, France, and was posthumously awarded the Distinguished Service Cross (United States).

=== World War II ===
The airfield has its origin in the 1940 Destroyers for Bases Agreement between Great Britain and the United States. For material support in the allied war effort, Britain agreed to lease as potential naval and air bases to the United States at several locations in the Americas.

The development of Vernam Field was viewed initially by the Army Air Corps as a staging field for training and for the operations of Borinquen Field, Puerto Rico. It was given its designation on 14 June 1941, and a force of 200 officers and enlisted men (known as "Force Tuna") embarked from New York and arrived on 17 November as a survey party to establish the airfield.

The design of the airfield was upgraded to that of a bomber airfield, and consisted of three runways: a 6000-foot concrete runway and two shorter asphalt runways to accommodate crosswind landings. When officially activated on 21 November 1941, the station was assigned to the 24th Composite Wing, Sixth Air Force, which controlled (in addition to this base) Atkinson, Beane, Coolidge, Ramey and Waller Fields in the Antilles Air Command. Constructions of airfield runways and a support station was ongoing throughout 1942, and the first operational unit did not arrive until September 12.

With the United States entry into the war in December, the primary mission of Vernam Field was antisubmarine patrols in the Northern Caribbean. In addition, the Florida-based Army Air Forces School of Applied Tactics would send student groups to Vernam for advanced base operations training in combat tactics, returning to Florida after completion. By 1944, the airfield had fallen into "backwater" status, as the anti-submarine war in the Caribbean had moved much further south towards South America and Panama. After the departure of the 35th Bomb Squadron, the remaining units assigned to the field were a detachment of the 10588th Ordnance Company and the 305th Signal Company, along with a medical detachment. On 30 June 1944, Eleanor Roosevelt visited the station.

In early 1945, Vernam Field became the destination for many B-29 Superfortress aircraft from Second Air Force training flights originating from training bases in Kansas and Nebraska (approximately 2,000 miles distant). The B-29s would fly on cross-country training flights to Vernam and land at the airfield for refuelling and maintenance before returning to the Midwest. It was, unfortunately, the site of several B-29 crashes.

=== Postwar use ===
With the end of the war, Vernam Field was reduced in scope to a skeleton staff. By the end of 1946 only two aircraft, a C-45 and a C-47 were assigned to the station with both aircraft being down for parts and minimal maintenance being undertaken. It was placed under the command of the 24th Composite Wing, Headquartered at Borinquen AFB, Puerto Rico. The airfield became a training destination for early jet aircraft cross-country flights, with P-80 Shooting Stars, F-84 Thunderjets and early F-86A Sabres using its long wartime bomber runways.

The airfield was redesignated Vernam Air Force Base on March 26, 1948, by Department of the Air Force General Order Number 10. The mission of the base was primarily weather reporting, with a detachment of the Military Air Transport Service (MATS) 6th Weather Squadron (Regional) being the primary unit on the base. It also became a destination for long-range Strategic Air Command fighter escort aircraft, with F-82 Twin Mustangs flying to Vernam from Kearney AFB, Nebraska then returning on cross-country training flights. President Harry S. Truman visited Vernam AFB on 30 June 1948 during a tour of the Caribbean.

Vernam AFB closed on 28 May 1949 due to budgetary cutbacks. After closure, the base was essentially abandoned and all structures were removed or torn down. The facility has been derelict for decades. The only use of the former airfield area has been an automobile racetrack known as Vernamfield which uses some of the old runways and taxiways.

=== Units assigned ===
- 4th Antisubmarine Squadron, Caribbean Sea Frontier (United States Navy) (B-18 Bolo)

14 September-6 October 1942, 16 October-5 November 1942

- 35th Bombardment Squadron, 25th Bombardment Group (B-25 Mitchell)

7 October 1943-7 February 1944

- 417th Bombardment Squadron, 25th Bombardment Group, 24 September 1942 – 29 May 1943 (B-18 Bolo)

== Current development plans ==
During the 2000s, the Government of Jamaica made several proposals to develop Vernam Field as the island's fourth international airport. In September 2008 it was announced that as part of this development Jamaica's military, the Jamaica Defence Force (JDF), was to be moved to Vernam Field from its historic city centre site at Up Park Camp in Kingston. By June 2009 the JDF had secured the site and it was reported that the Vernam Airfield Development Project was to build an initial 10,000-11,000 foot runway and adjoining taxi ways capable of handling the largest contemporary aircraft including the Antonov An-124, Antonov An-225 and the Airbus A380.
