= Enam, Nancowry =

Enam Hinam
- village
- Location in Andaman and Nicobar Islands, India Enam (India)
- Coordinates: 8.254093°N 93.104695°E
- Country: India
- State: Andaman and Nicobar Islands
- District: Nicobar
- Tehsil: Nancowry

Population (2011)
  - Total: 223
- Time zone: UTC+5:30 (IST)
- Census code: 645036

Enam is a village in the Nicobar district of Andaman and Nicobar Islands, India. It is located in the Nancowry tehsil.

== Demographics ==
According to the 2011 census of India, Enam has 56 households. The effective literacy rate (i.e. the literacy rate of population excluding children aged 6 and below) is 67.19%.

Demographics (2011 Census)
| | Total | Male | Female |
|---|---|---|---|
| Population | 223 | 111 | 112 |
| Children aged below 6 years | 31 | 13 | 18 |
| Scheduled caste | 0 | 0 | 0 |
| Scheduled tribe | 221 | 111 | 110 |
| Literates | 129 | 83 | 46 |
| Workers (all) | 70 | 64 | 6 |
| Main workers (total) | 5 | 3 | 2 |
| Main workers: Cultivators | 0 | 0 | 0 |
| Main workers: Agricultural labourers | 0 | 0 | 0 |
| Main workers: Household industry workers | 0 | 0 | 0 |
| Main workers: Other | 5 | 3 | 2 |
| Marginal workers (total) | 65 | 61 | 4 |
| Marginal workers: Cultivators | 0 | 0 | 0 |
| Marginal workers: Agricultural labourers | 0 | 0 | 0 |
| Marginal workers: Household industry workers | 0 | 0 | 0 |
| Marginal workers: Others | 65 | 61 | 4 |
| Non-workers | 153 | 47 | 106 |
