= 1st Strategic Aerospace Division =

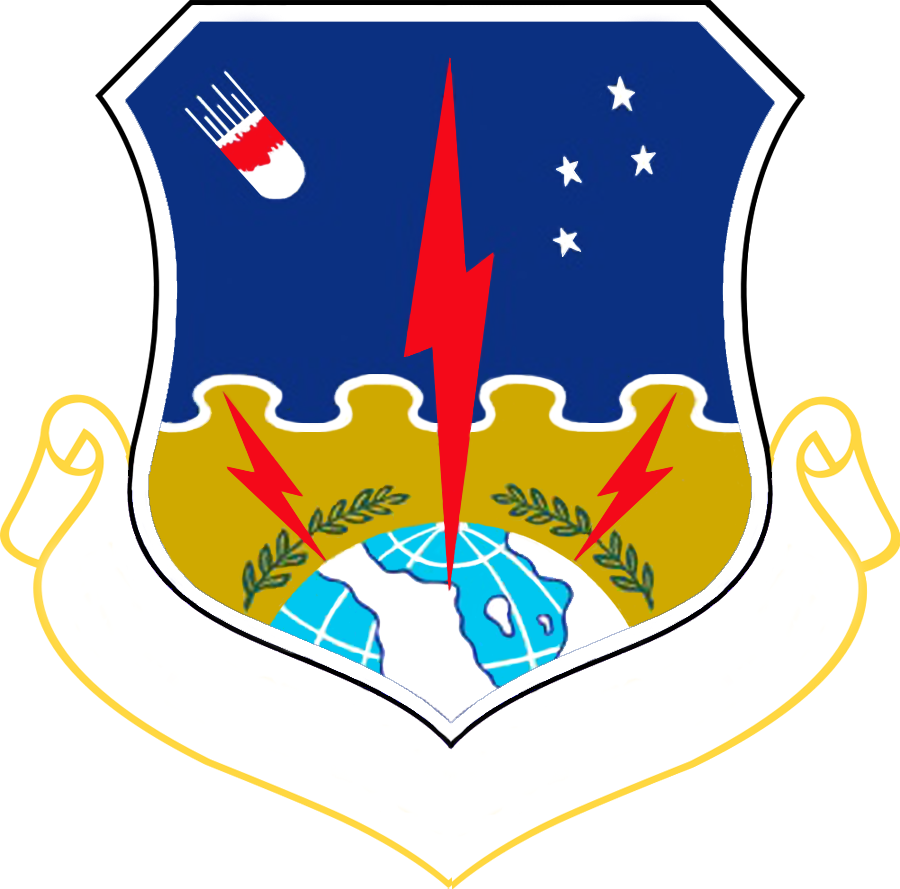
- 1st Strategic Aerospace Division emblem
- Active: 1943–31 October 1945; 1946–1948; 1954–1955; 1955–1956; 1957–1991
- Country: United States
- Branch: United States Air Force
- Role: Command of Missile units
- Part of: Strategic Air Command
- Garrison/HQ: Vandenberg Air Force Base, California
- Engagements: World War II; European Campaign (1943–1945)
- Decorations: Distinguished Unit Citation: Germany, January 11, 1944; Air Force Outstanding Unit Awards: January 1, 1970 – June 30, 1971; July 1, 1974 – June 30, 1976; July 1, 1977 – June 30, 1979; July 1, 1982 – June 30, 1983; July 1, 1984 – June 30, 1986; July 1, 1986 – June 30, 1988.

Commanders
- Notable commanders: Lt Gen Gerald W. Johnson

The 1st Strategic Aerospace Division is an inactive United States Air Force organization. Its last assignment was with Strategic Air Command, assigned to Fifteenth Air Force, being stationed at Vandenberg Air Force Base, California. It was inactivated on September 1, 1991.

The division directed and supervised heavy bombardment (1943–1945) and fighter (1944–1945) operations during World War II within the Eighth Air Force in the European Theater.

Replacing the Eighth Air Force in Okinawa in June 1946, the division directed fighter reconnaissance and bomber organizations, and provided air defense for the Ryukyu Islands, Japan until December 1948.

From 1954 to 1955, the division served as a holding unit at Westover Air Force Base, Massachusetts, for personnel of Eighth Air Force, who moved to the base as part of a transfer of Eighth's headquarters from Carswell Air Force Base, Texas.

Activated again under the Air Research and Development Command in April 1957, it was the first division level organization controlling intermediate range and intercontinental ballistic missiles. It became an operational component of Strategic Air Command (SAC) in January 1958 and began operational testing of missile systems, supporting missile launchings by SAC and other agencies, and training SAC missilemen. These missions continued until the final disbandment on September 1, 1991.

== Lineage ==
- Established as the 1st Bombardment Division on August 30, 1943

Activated on September 13, 1943
Redesignated 1st Air Division on December 19, 1944
Inactivated on October 31, 1945

- Activated on June 7, 1946

Inactivated on December 1, 1948
Activated on July 1, 1954
Inactivated on April 1, 1955

- Redesignated 1st Air Division (Meteorological Survey) on April 12, 1955

Activated on April 15, 1955
Inactivated on May 20, 1956

- Redesignated 1st Missile Division on March 18, 1957

Activated on April 15, 1957

- Redesignated 1st Strategic Aerospace Division on July 21, 1961

Redesignated Strategic Missile Center on July 31, 1990
Inactivated on September 1, 1991

== Assignments ==
- VIII Bomber Command (later, Eighth Air Force), September 13, 1943
- VIII Fighter Command, July 16 – October 31, 1945
- Pacific Air Command, U.S. Army (later Far East Air Forces), June 7, 1946 – December 1, 1948
- Eighth Air Force, July 1, 1954 – April 1, 1955
- Strategic Air Command, April 15, 1955 – May 20, 1956
- Air Research and Development Command, April 15, 1957
- Strategic Air Command, January 1, 1958
- Fifteenth Air Force, September 1, 1988 – September 1, 1991

== Stations ==
- Brampton Grange, United Kingdom, September 13, 1943
- RAF Alconbury, United Kingdom, September 16 – October 31, 1945
- Kadena (later Kadena Army Air Base, Kadena Air Force Base), Okinawa, June 7, 1946 – December 1, 1948
- Westover Air Force Base, Massachusetts, July 1, 1954 – April 1, 1955
- Offutt Air Force Base, Nebraska, April 15, 1955 – May 20, 1956
- Inglewood, CA, April 15, 1957
- Cooke Air Force Base (later Vandenberg Air Force Base), California, July 16, 1957 – September 1, 1991

== Components ==
Divisions

- 301st Fighter Division (Provisional): August 18 – September 16, 1948 (not operational entire period)
- 316th Air Division: See 316th Bombardment Wing below

Wings

(World War II)

- 1st Combat Bombardment Wing (later 1st Bombardment Wing): September 13, 1943 – August 12, 1945
- 2d Bombardment Wing: July 31 – August 12, 1945
- 40th Combat Bombardment Wing (later 40th Bombardment Wing): September 13, 1943 – September 26, 1945
- 41st Combat Bombardment Wing (later 41st Bombardment Wing): September 13, 1943 – June 1, 1945
- 67th Fighter Wing: attached October 6 – December 31, 1944, assigned January 1 – August 12, 1945
- 92d Combat Bombardment Wing: December 1 – c. December 11, 1943
- 94th Combat Bombardment Wing (later 94 Bombardment Wing): December 12, 1943 – June 18, 1945
- 101st Provisional Heavy Bombardment Combat: attached September 13–16, 1943
- 102d Provisional Heavy Bombardment Combat: attached September 13–16, 1943
- 103d Provisional Heavy Bombardment Combat: attached September 13–16, 1943

(United States Air Force)

- 32d Composite Wing: August 24 – December 1, 1948
- 51st Fighter Wing: August 18 – December 1, 1948.
- 71st Tactical Reconnaissance Wing: August 18 – October 25, 1948 (not operational, and detached, August 24 – October 25, 1948)
- 301st Fighter Wing: June 7, 1946 – December 1, 1948 (not operational, August 18 – December 1, 1948)
- 316th Bombardment Wing (later 316th Air Division): June 7, 1946 – June 21, 1948
- 392d Strategic Missile Wing: October 18 – December 20, 1961
- 456th Troop Carrier Wing: attached c. April 15, 1955 – March 26, 1956
- 703d Strategic Missile Wing: September 25, 1958 – January 15, 1959
- 704th Strategic Missile Wing: August 1, 1957 – July 1, 1959 (not operational April 6 – July 1, 1959)
- 706th Strategic Missile Wing: February 23, 1958 – January 16, 1959
- 4320th Strategic Wing (Missile): February 1–23, 1958
- 4392d Aerospace Support Wing: July 21 – December 20, 1961, July 1, 1987 – January 15, 1991
- Strategic Missile, Provisional: attached January 1 – February 1, 1958 (became 4320th Strategic Wing subsequently)

Groups

- 6th Bombardment Group: June 1, 1947 – October 18, 1948 (not operational)
- 71st Tactical Reconnaissance Group: attached August 18 – November 1, 1948
- 93d Bombardment Group: attached May 24 – August 25, 1948
- 94th Bombardment Group: August 12 – September 26, 1945
- 96th Bombardment Group: August 12 – September 26, 1945
- 98th Bombardment Group: attached August 25 – December 1, 1948
- 100th Bombardment Group: August 12 – September 26, 1945
- 4000th Support Group (later other designations): 1966–1983

Squadrons

- 644th Strategic Missile Squadron: April–December 1959, attached Apr 6-Jun 30, 1959, assigned Jul 1-l Nov 1959 (never operational).
- 864 Strategic Missile (later, 864 Technical Training): attached 1 Nov 1958-30 Jun 1959, assigned 1 Jul 1959-1 Jun 1960.
- 865 Strategic Missile (later, 865 Technical Training): attached 1 Nov 1958-30 Jun 1959, assigned Jul 1-Nov 1, 1959.
- 866 Strategic Missile (later, 866 Technical Training): attached 1 Nov 1958-30 Jun 1959, assigned 1 Jul 1959-25 May 1962 (not operational, May 17-25, 1962)
- 4315th Combat Crew Training Squadron (Note: I was assigned to the 4315 CCTS at Vandenberg from April 1979 through July 1984 as Chief of Maintenance for the ICBM crew training simulators.)
- Others, including 6 Troop Carrier: attached Jun 10, 1946-c. Apr 1947. 25 Liaison: Mar 30-Sep 15, 1947. 36 Bombardment: 21 Nov 1943-27 Feb 1944 (detached 4 Dec 1943-27 Feb 1944); Jan 1-Aug 12, 1945; Sep 1-Oct 1945. 392 Missile Training: attached Apr 6-Jun 30, 1959, assigned 1 Jul 1959-18 Oct 1961; assigned 20 Dec 1961-1 Feb 1963. 394 Missile Training (later, 394 Strategic Missile; 394 ICBM Test Maintenance): attached Apr 6-Dec 15, 1958; assigned 1 Jul 1960-18 Oct 1961; assigned 20 Dec 1961-1 Sep 1991. 395 Missile Training (later 395 Strategic Missile): attached Apr 6-Jun 30, 1959, assigned 1 Jul 1959-18 Oct 1961; assigned 20 Dec 1961-31 Dec 1969. 406 Bombardment: c. 11 Nov 1943-26 Feb 1944 (detached 4 Dec 1943-21 Feb 1944); 30 Dec 1944-5 Aug 1945. 576 Strategic Missile: attached Apr 6-Jun 30, 1959, assigned 1 Jul 1959-18 Oct 1961; assigned 20 Dec 1961-2 Apr 1966. 6652 Bombardment: Jul 13-Aug 25, 1945; Sep 1-Oct 12, 1945. 857 Bombardment: attached Mar 10-c. Aug 1945.

== Aircraft and missiles operated ==
From (Note: See' list in Air Force Historical Research Agency Factsheet, 1 Strategic Aerospace Division)

Aircraft

- Boeing B-17 Flying Fortress, 1943–1945
- Consolidated B-24 Liberator, 1943–1945
- North American P-51 Mustang, 1944–1945
- Boeing B-29 Superfortress 1946–1948
- Republic P-47 Thunderbolt, 1944, 1946–1948
- Northrop P-61 Black Widow, 1946–1948
- Lockheed F-80 Shooting Star, 1947–1948
- B/ERB-17, 1946–1948
- B-25, 1946
- B-29/F-13, 1946–1947
- Beechcrat C-45 Expeditor, 1946
- Curtiss C-46 Commando, 1946–1947
- L-4, 1946
- L-5, 1946–1948
- OA-10, 1946–1947
- R-6, 1946
- B/FB-17, 1948
- RB-29, 1948
- F-2, 1948
- C-119, 1955–1956

Missile systems

- PGM-17 Thor, 1958–1962
- SM-65 Atlas, 1958–1966
- PGM-19 Jupiter, 1958–1962
- SM-68 Titan, 1960–1969
- Minuteman I, 1961–1975
- LGM-25C Titan II, 1962–1977
- Minuteman II, 1966
- Minuteman III, 1971–1991.

== See also ==
- List of United States Air Force air divisions
