= Roy Wilkins (disambiguation) =

Roy Wilkins (1901–1981) was a prominent activist in the Civil Rights Movement in the United States from the 1930s to the 1970s.

Roy Wilkins may also refer to:

== People ==
- Roy Wilkins (American football) (1933–2002), American football linebacker
- Roy Wilkins (cricketer) (1892–1965), Australian cricketer

== Other uses ==
- Roy Wilkins Auditorium, a 5,000-seat multi-purpose arena in St. Paul, Minnesota
- Roy Wilkins Park, a 54-acre park in the St. Albans neighborhood of southeastern Queens in New York City
- Roy Wilkins Renown Service Award, an award created by the National Association for the Advancement of Colored People
