= General Mercer =

General Mercer may refer to:

- Cavalié Mercer (1783–1868), British Army general
- Charles F. Mercer (1778–1858), Virginia State Militia brigadier general
- David Mercer (Royal Marines officer) (1864–1920), Royal Marines major general
- Hugh Mercer (1726–1777), Continental Army brigadier general
- Hugh W. Mercer (1808–1877), Confederate States Army brigadier general
- Malcolm Mercer (1859–1916), Canadian Army major general
- Roosevelt Mercer Jr. (fl. 1970s–2000s), U.S. Air Force major general

== See also ==
- Auguste Mercier (1833–1921), French Army general
- Denis Mercier (born 1959), French Air Force general
