= John Witherspoon (disambiguation) =

John Witherspoon (1723–1794) was a Founding Father of the United States.

John Witherspoon may also refer to:

- John Witherspoon (actor) (1942–2019), American actor
- John G. Witherspoon (1939–1994), American sailor
