= 30th Operations Group =

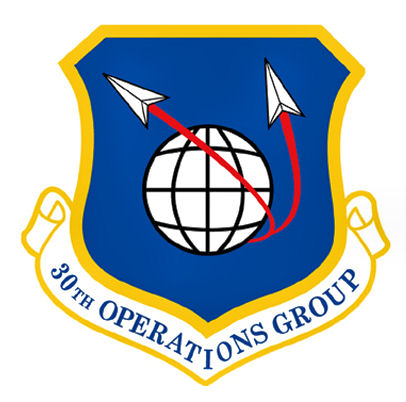
- Shield of the 30th Operations Group
- Active: 20 November 1940–26 May 2021
- Country: United States
- Branch: United States Space Force
- Type: Operations group
- Role: Space launch
- Part of: 30th Space Wing
- Headquarters: Vandenberg AFB, California, U.S.
- Engagements: Antisubmarine, American Theater Central Pacific; Air Offensive, Japan; Eastern Mandates; Western Pacific

- Decorations: Air Force Outstanding Unit Award

Commanders
- Notable commanders: John W. Raymond

The 30th Operations Group (30 OG) was a group of the United States Space Force. It was assigned to the 30th Space Wing, stationed at Vandenberg Air Force Base, California. It was responsible for all space launch operations from the West Coast of the United States, including all polar launches. It operated the Western Range, which conducts launches for the Space Force, other parts of the Department of Defense, NASA, and private space corporations. In 2021 the 30th Operations Group and the 30th Mission Support Group were inactivated and squadrons assigned to Space Launch Delta 30.

== Units ==
- 2d Range Operations Squadron (2 ROPS)

Controls and operates the Western Range for spacelift, ballistic missile test launch, aeronautical test, air defense exercise, missile defense test launch and space surveillance operations. 2 ROPS directs over 1,000 Air Force and contractor personnel at four geographically separated locations spanning more than 450 miles. The squadron ensures optimum configuration and performance of tracking, telemetry, communications, data analysis and meteorological assets valued at over $1.5 billion.

- 30th Operations Support Squadron (30th OSS)

The squadron leads the wing spacelift operations training program, operates a $3.5 billion airfield complex, develops weapon system tactics for the 30th OG and provides intelligence services for the wing and tenant units. The 30th OSS operates the Air Force's only space Training Device Design and Engineering Center, producing most of the space and missile training devices used throughout AFSPC and Air Education and Training Command.

- 30th Space Communications Squadron (30th SCS)

Is a key partner in the successful launching of satellites for combatant commanders' requirements and other test range activities. The squadron is focused on the operation and maintenance of the Western Range network segment enabling Wight test, spacelift and ballistic missions. The 30th SCS manages the budget for optical tracking, land mobile radio, airfield systems, RF spectrum management, missile silo communications, base secure and non-secure voice/video/data network operations, network defense, computer systems support, personal wireless communications systems, base-level services, information management, small computers, visual information and communications security for AFSPC, the 14th Air Force, 30th SW, Western Range and tenant units. Additionally, the 30th SCS provides support for telephone services and infrastructure management/upgrades.

- 30th Range Management Squadron (30th RMS) Now part of 2 ROPS

As of July 2017, 30th RMS has merged with 2 ROPS. Manages day-to-day contractor operations and maintenance of the range, launch complexes and payload facilities. The unit provides acquisition program management and quality assurance expertise on all 30th SW and Space and Missile Systems Center (SMC) mission support contracts and space programs. Additionally, the 30th RMS provides technical requirements development, systems integration, operational acceptance testing and sustainment services for 30th SW range systems. The squadron interfaces with SMC for all range sustainment, integration and development efforts.

- 30th Weather Flight (30th WF)

Provides 30th Space Wing and tenant units a full range of weather services supporting launch, air and ground operations. Major services include daily weather forecasting, toxic hazard zone forecasting, surface and upper-air observing, technical support and around-the-clock resource protection from severe weather. The 30th WS provides planning and day-of-launch on-console weather support to the Western Range Control Center for all Western Range launch operations.

== History ==
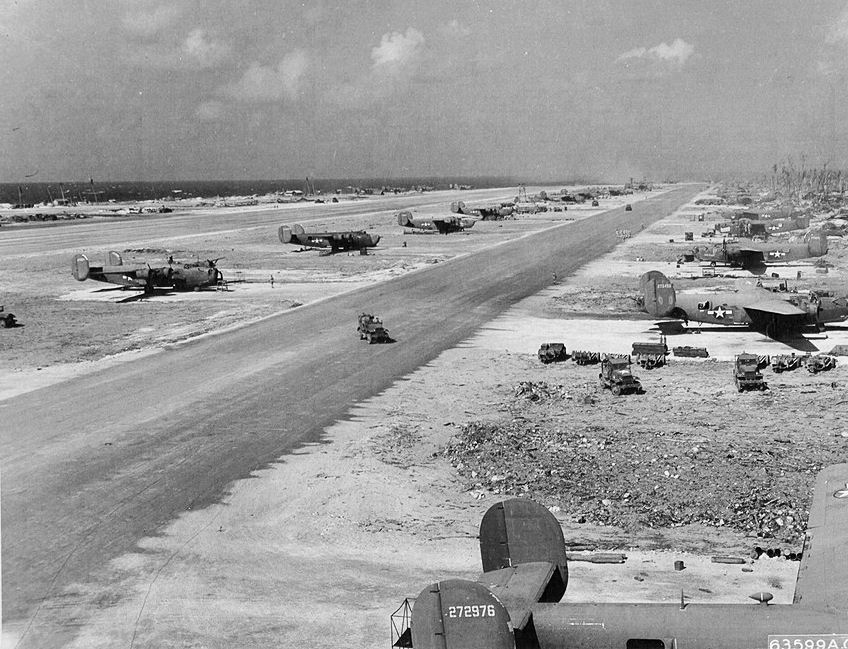
30th Bombardment Group B-24 Liberators at Kwajalein Airfield, Kwajalein, Marshall Islands, 1944

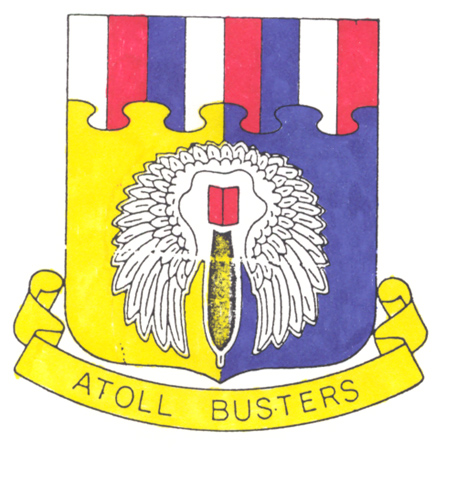
Crest of the 30th Bombardment Group.

Patrolled west coast, 1942–1943, while training crews for other units.

Began operations in the Pacific in November 1943. Attacked enemy installations on the Gilbert Islands in support of U.S. invasion; raided enemy airfields in the Marshalls to prevent Japanese airplanes launching against Tarawa. From January–March 1944, bombed installations in the Marshalls in preparation for their occupation. During April–Jul, raided airfields and navy facilities in the Truk Islands to keep them neutralized during the U.S. attack on the Marianas; also bombed Wake, Guam, and Saipan. From August 1944 until the U.S. took Iwo Jima in early 1945, the group attacked airfields and shipping in the Bonin and Volcano Islands and hit bypassed islands in the Carolines and Marianas until March 1945, when group returned to Hawaii for routine patrols and training until inactivated.

Search, rescue, and recovery missions in area of Vandenberg AFB, CA, 1993–. Launched meteorological and surveillance satellites into polar earth orbit, 1990–. Launched first interceptor missile in Ground-based Midcourse Defense (GMD) program, September 2006. Deployed airmen worldwide to meet national commitments, 2005–.

As part of the transition to the new USSF Delta structure, both 30 OG and 30th Mission Support Group were inactivated with squadrons previously under these groups now reporting to the SLD 30 commander.

=== Lineage ===
- Established as the 30th Bombardment Group (Heavy) on 20 November 1940

Activated on 15 January 1941
Redesignated as: 30th Bombardment Group, Heavy on 20 August 1943
Inactivated on 25 June 1946

- Redesignated 30th Operations Group on 1 November 1991

Activated on 19 November 1991
Inactivated on 26 May 2021

=== Assignments ===
- 1st Bombardment Wing, 15 January 1941
- 21st Bombardment Wing, 24 May 1941
- III Bomber Command, 5 September 1941
- Fourth Air Force, December 1941
- IV Bomber Command, 20 January 1942
- Seventh Air Force, 11 October 1943
- VII Bomber Command, 17 October 1943
- Army Air Forces, Pacific Ocean Areas, 17 March 1945
- 7th Fighter Wing, 15 August 1945 – 25 June 1946
- 30th Space Wing, 19 November 1991 – 26 May 2021

=== Components ===
- 2d Range Operations Squadron
- 2d Space Launch Squadron: 19 November 1991 – 1 December 2003
- 4th Space Launch Squadron: 15 April 1994 – 29 June 1998
- 30th Space Communications Squadron
- 2d Reconnaissance Squadron (Heavy) (later 392d Bombardment Squadron) attached 15 January 1941 – 21 April 1942, assigned 22 April 1942 – 30 November 1945
- 21st Bombardment Squadron: 15 January 1941 – 1 November 1943 (detached, 9 January 1942 – September 1943)
- 27th Bombardment Squadron: 15 January 1941 – 20 March 1946
- 38th Bombardment Squadron: 15 January 1941 – 20 March 1946
- 76th Rescue Flight, later 76th Helicopter Flight, later 76th Helicopter Squadron, 1 July 1993 – 31 August 2007

=== Stations ===
- March Field, California, 15 January 1941
- New Orleans Army Air Base, Louisiana, c. 7 June 1941
- Muroc Army Air Field, California, 14 December 1941
- March Field, California, 7 February 1942 – 28 September 1943
- Hickam Field, Hawaii, 20 October 1943
- Funafuti Airfield & Nanumea Airfield, Tuvalu, 12 November 1943
- Abemama Airfield, Abemama, Kiribati, 4 January 1944
- Kwajalein Airfield, Kwajalein, Marshall Islands, c. 20 March 1944
- East Field (Saipan), Mariana Islands, 4 August 1944
- Wheeler Field, Hawaii, 17 March 1945
- Kahuku Field, Hawaii, 29 September 1945
- Wheeler Field, Hawaii, February −25 June 1946
- Vandenberg Air Force Base, California, 19 November 1991 – present

=== Aircraft and Missiles ===
- B-18 Bolo, 1941–1942
- A-29 Hudson, 1941–1942
- YB-17 Flying Fortress, 1941
- LB-30 Liberator, 1941, 1942
- B-25 Mitchell, 1942
- B-24 Liberator, 1942–1946
- SM-65 Atlas Missile, 1990–1995
- UH-1 Huey Helicopter, 1993–2007
- LGM-25C Titan II Missile, 1997–1999, 2002–2003
- Titan IV Missile, 1995–1997, 1999–2003
- Atlas II Missile, 2000–2003
- Delta II Missile, 2000–2003
- Pegasus Missile, 2000–2003
- LGM-30 Minuteman Missile, 2000–2003
- Minotaur I Missile, 2000–2003

== List of commanders ==
- Col Stephen C. Sherwood, 19 Nov 1991
- Col John R. Niederhauser, 11 Aug 1992
- Col Erik C. Anderson, 7 Jul 1993
- Col William E. Caffall, 26 Jun 1995
- Col Ronald J. Haeckel, 22 Jul 1996
- Col Robert E. Wood, 18 Jan 1997
- Col Kenneth A. Cinal, 14 Apr 1998
- Col Mark H. Owen, 15 May 2000
- Col Edward L. Bolton Jr., 14 May 2002
- Col Stephen M. Tanous, 8 Jul 2003
- Col John W. Raymond, 24 Jun 2005
- Lt Col Scott D. Peel (acting), 20 Sep 2006
- Col John W. Raymond, 29 Jan 2007
- Col Andre L. Lovett, 22 Jun 2007
- Col Todd W. Gossett, 29 May 2009
- Col David E. Hook, 15 Jun 2011
- Col Marcelino E. Del Rosario Jr., 25 Jun 2013
- Col Jennifer L. Grant, July 2015
- Col Curtis Hernandez, 2017
- Col Kris E. Barcomb, Jan 19 - May 21
- Col Bryan M. Titus, May 22 - May 24

== Bibliography ==
- Maurer, Maurer, ed. (1983) [1961]. Air Force Combat Units of World War II (PDF) (reprint ed.). Washington, DC: Office of Air Force History. ISBN 0-912799-02-1. LCCN 61060979. Archived from the original (PDF) on 20 December 2016.
- Maurer, Maurer, ed. (1982) [1969]. Combat Squadrons of the Air Force, World War II (PDF) (reprint ed.). Washington, DC: Office of Air Force History. ISBN 0-405-12194-6. LCCN 70605402. OCLC 72556. Archived from the original (PDF) on 20 December 2016.
