= 76th Helicopter Squadron =

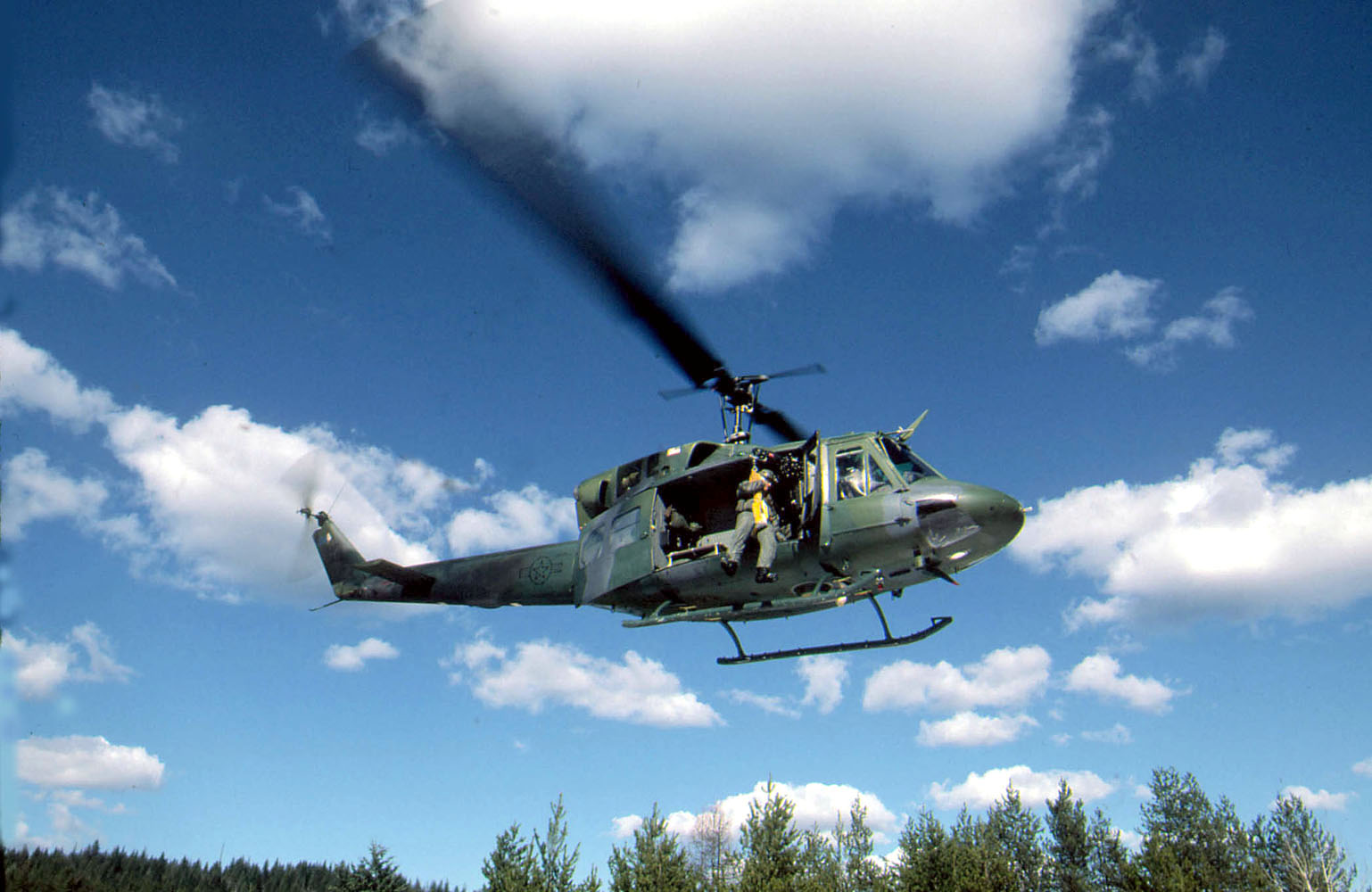
- UH-1 Huey as flown by the squadron at Vandenberg AFB
- Active: 1952–1975; 1993–2007
- Country: United States
- Branch: United States Air Force
- Role: airlift support
- Motto(s): Samaritans of the Sky (1952-1975)
- Decorations: Navy Meritorious Unit Commendation; Air Force Outstanding Unit Award

Insignia
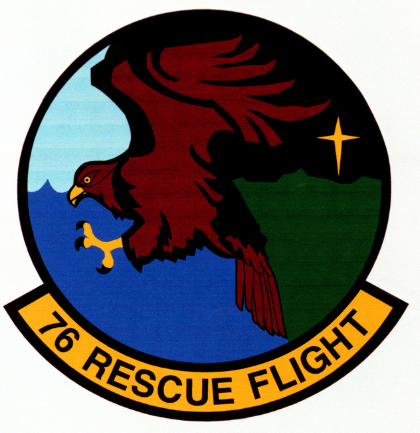
- 76th Helicopter Flight emblem (approved 26 July 1995)

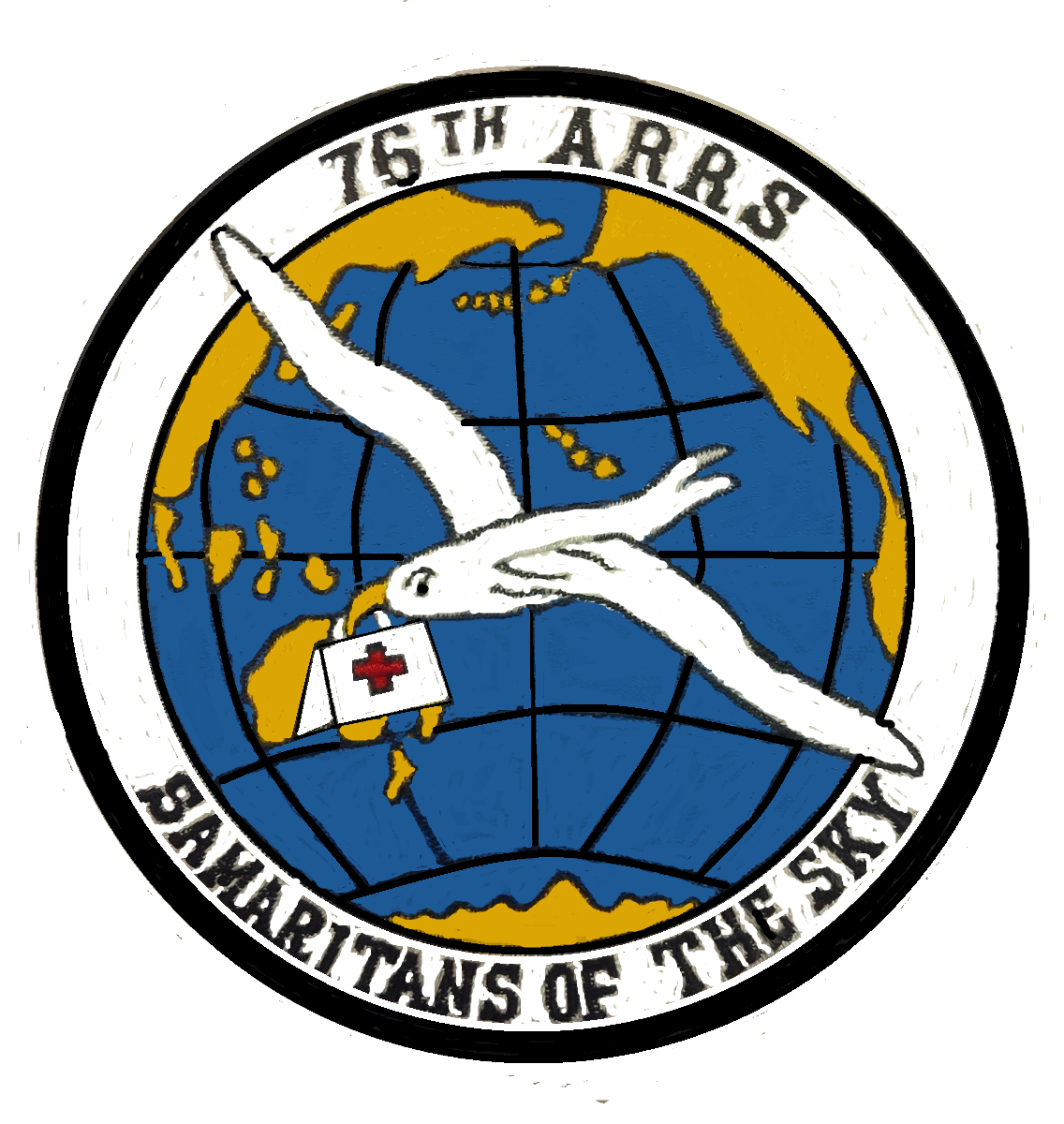
- 76th Aerospace Rescue & Recovery Squadron emblem

The 76th Helicopter Squadron is an inactivated United States Air Force unit that was based at Vandenberg Air Force Base, California assigned to the 30th Operations Group, 30th Space Wing that was tasked to support range operations as well as search and rescue missions. The squadron operated the UH-1N Huey helicopter.

== History ==
Provided search, rescue, and recovery services in central and southern Pacific Ocean areas. Supported space recovery operations for Discoverer, Gemini, Apollo, and Skylab programs. Maintained aircraft at Johnson Island during atomic bomb tests in the Pacific. Search, rescue, recovery, and other missions in the area of Vandenberg Air Force Base, especially during periods of missile launches.

The unit logged more than 35,000 hours of accident free flying hours. The helicopter squadron has supported high profile rescue and fire suppression missions, including humanitarian relief in the Gulf States in the aftermath of Hurricane Katrina.

== Lineage ==
- Constituted as the 76th Air Rescue Squadron on 17 October 1952

Activated on 14 November 1952
Redesignated 76th Aerospace Rescue and Recovery Squadron on 8 January 1966
Inactivated on 1 August 1975

- Redesignated 76th Rescue Flight on 1 April 1993

Activated on 1 May 1993
Redesignated 76th Helicopter Flight on 1 May 1998
Redesignated 76th Helicopter Squadron on 21 October 2005
Inactivated on 31 August 2007

=== Assignments ===
- 11th Air Rescue Group, 14 November 1952 (attached to Pacific Division, Military Air Transport Service)
- Air Rescue Service, 16 February 1954 (attached to Pacific Division, Military Air Transport Service to 1 July 1955, then to Far East Air Forces)
- 2d Air Rescue Group, 20 Sep 1955 (attached to Far East Air Forces to c. 1 Jul 1957, then to 326th Air Division)
- Air Rescue Service (later Aerospace Rescue and Recovery Service), 24 June 1958 (attached to 326 Air Division to 8 May 1959, then to 6486th Air Base Wing until unknown date)
- Pacific Aerospace Rescue and Recovery Center (later 41st Aerospace Rescue and Recovery Wing), 1 April 1967 – 1 August 1975
- 310th Operations Group, 1 May 1993
- 30th Operations Group, 1 July 1993 – 31 August 2007

=== Stations ===
- Hickam Air Force Base, Hawaii, 14 November 1952 – 1 August 1975
- Vandenberg Air Force Base, California, 1 May 1993 – 31 August 2007

=== Aircraft ===
- Boeing SB-29 Superfortress (1955-1956)
- Grumman SA-16 Albatross (1956-1957, 1960-1961)
- Sikorsky SH-19 (1957-1960)
- Douglas SC-54 Skymaster (1956-1964)
- Boeing C-97 Stratofreighter (1964-1967)
- Boeing HC-97 Stratofreighter (1964-1967)
- Boeing KC-97 Stratofreighter (1964-1967)
- Lockheed HC-130 Hercules (1966-1975)
- Sikorsky HH-53 Super Jolly Green Giant (1972-1975)
- Bell UH-1 Iroquois (1993-2007)
