= 4th Space Launch Squadron =

- Active: 15 April 1994 – 29 June 1998; 1 December 2003 – 31 May 2019; 31 July 2026 – present
- Country: United States
- Branch: United States Space Force
- Type: Squadron
- Role: Space launch / Range management
- Part of: Space Launch Delta 30, Space Systems Command
- Garrison/HQ: Vandenberg Space Force Base, California
- Decorations: Air Force Outstanding Unit Award

Commanders
- Current commander: Lt. Col. Kyle Rowland

Insignia
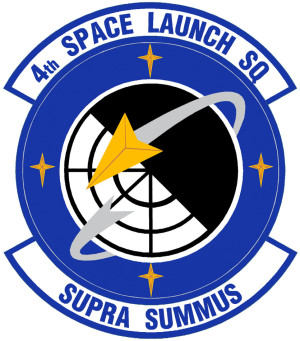
- 4th Space Launch Squadron emblem (approved 31 March 1995)

The 4th Space Launch Squadron (4 SLS) is a United States Space Force squadron assigned to Space Launch Delta 30 under Space Systems Command. It is stationed at Vandenberg Space Force Base, California. The squadron was originally an Air Force space launch unit that operated from 1994 to 1998 and again from 2003 to 2019. It was reactivated on 31 July 2026.

== Mission ==
Upon its 2026 reactivation, the 4th Space Launch Squadron assumed responsibility for range management at Vandenberg Space Force Base, with an eventual role supporting the installation’s “Spaceport of the Future” modernization efforts. This includes infrastructure, logistics, and range support functions required to sustain high-tempo launch and test operations on the Western Range.

In its earlier periods of service the squadron served as the Air Force’s Evolved Expendable Launch Vehicle (EELV) launch agency for the West Coast, managing Atlas V and Delta IV operations.

== History ==
The squadron was activated at Vandenberg Air Force Base on 15 April 1994. Until its inactivation in June 1998 it launched surveillance and meteorological satellites into polar orbit, primarily using Titan vehicles.

It was reactivated on 1 December 2003 and managed EELV operations (Atlas V and Delta IV) until it was inactivated on 31 May 2019 and its functions were absorbed into the newly designated 2nd Space Launch Squadron.

On 31 July 2026 the squadron was reactivated during a formal activation and assumption-of-command ceremony held at the Boathouse (the former Coast Guard rescue station) at South Vandenberg. U.S. Space Force Col. James T. Horne III, commander of Space Launch Delta 30, presided over the ceremony, uncased the unit’s colors, and passed command to Lt. Col. Kyle Rowland. The reactivation forms part of Space Launch Delta 30’s longer-term effort to expand range capacity and modernize Vandenberg as a multi-user spaceport.

== Lineage ==
- Constituted as the 4th Space Launch Squadron on 29 March 1994

Activated on 15 April 1994
Inactivated on 29 June 1998
Activated on 1 December 2003
Inactivated on 31 May 2019
Activated on 31 July 2026

=== Assignments ===
- 30th Operations Group, 15 April 1994 – 29 June 1998
- 30th Launch Group, 1 December 2003 – 20 July 2018
- 30th Operations Group, 20 July 2018 – 31 May 2019
- Space Launch Delta 30, 31 July 2026 – present

=== Stations ===
- Vandenberg Air Force Base (later Vandenberg Space Force Base), California, 15 April 1994 – 29 June 1998
- Vandenberg Air Force Base (later Vandenberg Space Force Base), California, 1 December 2003 – 31 May 2019
- Vandenberg Space Force Base, California, 31 July 2026 – present

=== Commanders ===
- Lt. Col. Kyle Rowland, 31 July 2026 – present

=== Decorations ===
Award streamer	Award	Dates	Notes
	Air Force Outstanding Unit Award	1 October 1994 – 30 September 1996	4th Space Launch Squadron
	Air Force Outstanding Unit Award	1 October 1996 – 30 September 1997	4th Space Launch Squadron
	Air Force Outstanding Unit Award	1 January 1997 – 31 December 1997	4th Space Launch Squadron
	Air Force Outstanding Unit Award	1 January 1998 – 29 June 1998	4th Space Launch Squadron
	Air Force Outstanding Unit Award	1 October 2009 – 30 September 2010	4th Space Launch Squadron

=== Launch vehicles (historical) ===
- Titan II (1997–1998)
- Titan IV (1995–1997)
- Delta IV (2003–2019)
- Atlas V (2003–2019)
