= Roy Wilkins =

American civil rights leader (1901–1981)

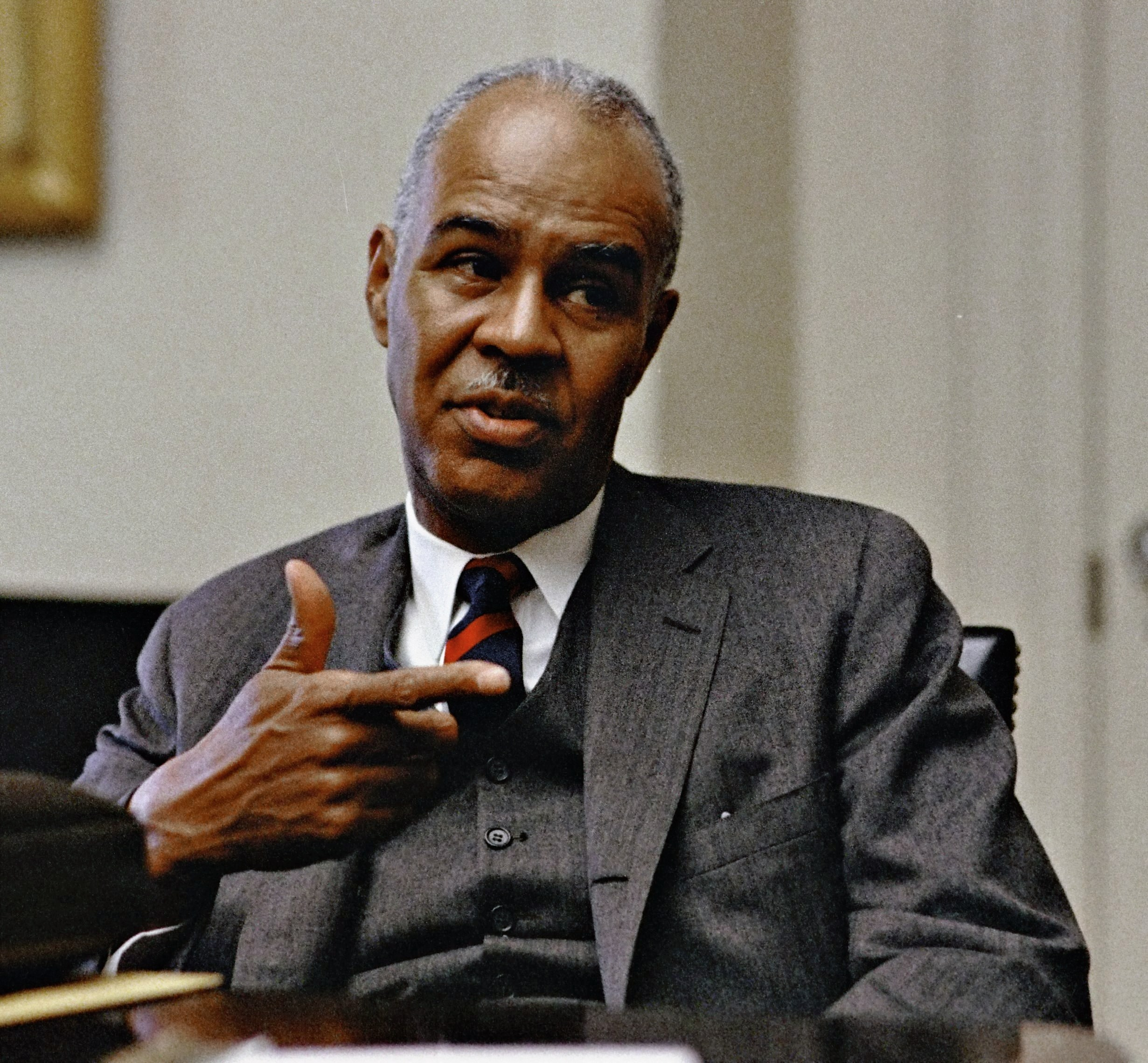
- Wilkins at the White House on April 30, 1968

Executive Secretary of the National Association for the Advancement of Colored People
- In office 1955–1977
- Preceded by: Walter Francis White
- Succeeded by: Benjamin Hooks (Executive Director)

Personal details
- Born: August 31, 1901 St. Louis, Missouri, U.S.
- Died: September 8, 1981 (aged 80) New York City, New York, U.S.
- Party: Democratic
- Spouse: Minnie Badeau (m. 1929)
- Relatives: Roger Wilkins (nephew)
- Education: University of Minnesota (BA)
- Awards: Spingarn Medal

Roy Ottoway Wilkins (August 30, 1901 – September 8, 1981) was an American civil rights leader from the 1930s to the 1970s. Wilkins's most notable role was his leadership of the National Association for the Advancement of Colored People (NAACP), in which he held the title of Executive Secretary from 1955 to 1963 and Executive Director from 1964 to 1977. Wilkins was a central figure in many notable marches of the civil rights movement and made contributions to African-American literature. He controversially advocated for African Americans to join the military.

== Early life ==
Wilkins was born in St. Louis, Missouri, on August 30, 1901. His father was not present for his birth, having fled the town in fear of being lynched after he refused demands to step away and yield the sidewalk to a white man. When he was four years old, his mother died from tuberculosis, and Wilkins and his siblings were then raised by an aunt and uncle in the Rondo neighborhood of Saint Paul, Minnesota, where they attended local schools. Wilkins graduated from Mechanic Arts High School. His nephew was Roger Wilkins. Wilkins graduated from the University of Minnesota with a degree in sociology in 1923.

In 1929, he married social worker Aminda "Minnie" Badeau; the couple had no children of their own, but they raised the two children of Hazel Wilkins-Colton, a writer from Philadelphia, Pennsylvania.

== Early career ==
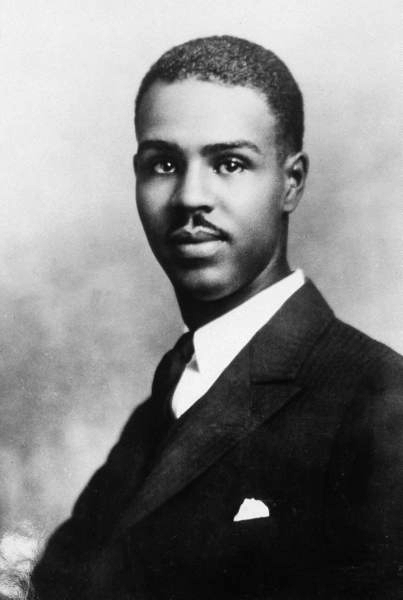
Wilkins c. 1937

While attending college, Wilkins worked as a journalist at The Minnesota Daily and became editor of The Appeal, an African-American newspaper. After he graduated he became the editor of The Call in 1923.

His confrontation of the Jim Crow laws led to his activist work, and in 1931 he moved to New York City as assistant NAACP secretary under Walter Francis White. When W. E. B. Du Bois left the organization in 1934, Wilkins replaced him as editor of The Crisis, the official magazine of the NAACP. From 1949 to 1950, Wilkins chaired the National Emergency Civil Rights Mobilization, which comprised more than 100 local and national groups.

He served as an adviser to the War Department during World War II.

In 1950, Wilkins—along with A. Philip Randolph, founder of the Brotherhood of Sleeping Car Porters, and Arnold Aronson, a leader of the National Jewish Community Relations Advisory Council—founded the Leadership Conference on Civil Rights (LCCR). LCCR has become the premier civil rights coalition, and has coordinated the national legislative campaign on behalf of every major civil rights law since 1957.

== NAACP leadership ==
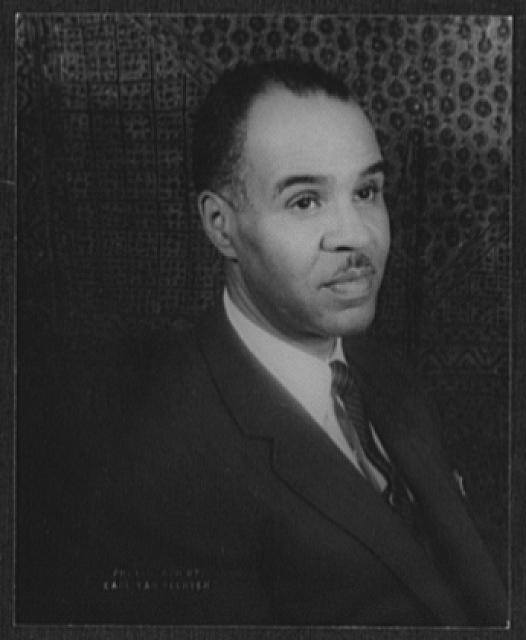
Portrait by Carl Van Vechten, 1958

In 1955, Wilkins was chosen to be the executive secretary of the NAACP and in 1964, he became its executive director. He had developed an excellent reputation as a spokesperson for the Civil Rights Movement. One of his first actions was to provide support to civil rights activists in Mississippi who were being subjected to a "credit squeeze" by members of the White Citizens Councils.

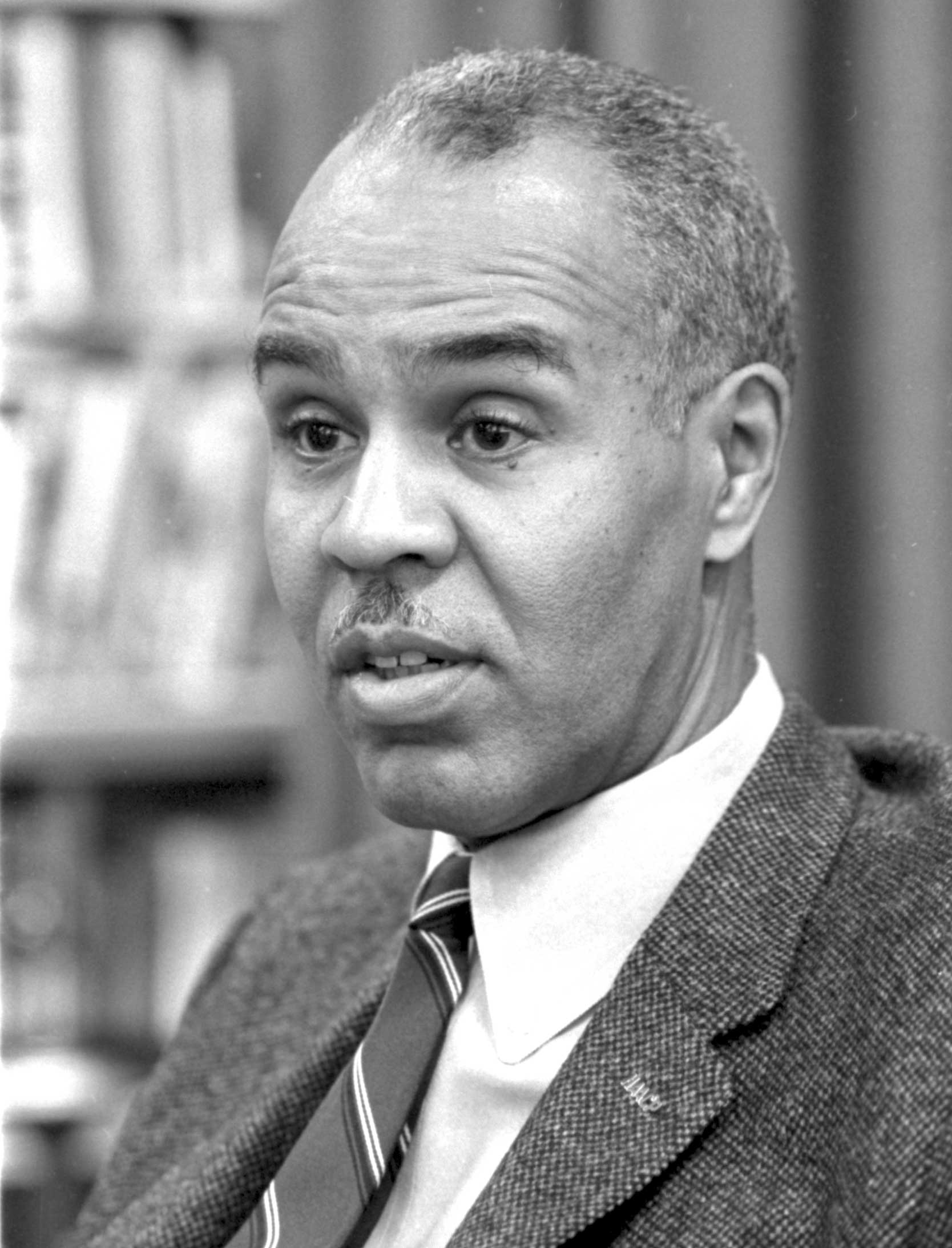
Roy Wilkins as the Executive Secretary of the NAACP in 1963

Wilkins backed a proposal suggested by T. R. M. Howard of Mound Bayou, Mississippi, who headed the Regional Council of Negro Leadership, a leading civil rights organization in the state. Under the plan, black businesses and voluntary associations shifted their accounts to the black-owned Tri-State Bank of Memphis, Tennessee. By the end of 1955, about $300,000 had been deposited in Tri-State for that purpose. The money enabled Tri-State to extend loans to credit-worthy blacks who were denied loans by white banks. Wilkins participated in the March on Washington (August 1963), which he had helped organize. The march was dedicated to the idea of protesting through acts of nonviolence in which Wilkins was a firm believer. Wilkins also participated in the Selma to Montgomery marches (1965) and the March Against Fear (1966).

He believed in achieving reform by legislative means, testified before many Congressional hearings, and conferred with Presidents Kennedy, Johnson, Nixon, Ford, and Carter. Those achievements gained Wilkins attention from government officials and other established politicians, earning him respect as well as the nickname, "Mr. Civil Rights". Wilkins strongly opposed militancy in the movement for civil rights as represented by the "black power" movement because of his support for nonviolence. He was a strong critic of racism in any form regardless of its creed, color, or political motivation, and he also declared that violence and racial separation of blacks and whites were not the answer. As late as 1962, Wilkins criticized the direct action methods of the Freedom Riders, but changed his stance after the Birmingham campaign, and was arrested for leading a picketing protest in 1963.

On issues of segregation, as well, he was a proponent of systematic integration instead of radical desegregation. In a 1964 interview with Robert Penn Warren for the book Who Speaks for the Negro?, Wilkins declared,

We Negroes want the improvements in the public school system – and among them, of course, the elimination of segregation, based upon race – the institution of the same quality education in the schools attended by our children as those attended by other children, and we want Negro teachers and we want Negro supervisors, and we want all the opportunity, but the only way our form of government and our structure of society can survive is by some common indoctrination of our citizenry, and we have found this in the public school system. And, for any reformer, black or white, zealot or not, to come along and say, "I'll destroy it, if it doesn't do like I want it to do," is very dangerous business, as far as I'm concerned.

However, his moderate views increasingly brought him into conflict with younger, more militant black activists who saw him as an "Uncle Tom".

Wilkins was also a member of Omega Psi Phi, a fraternity with a civil rights focus and one of the intercollegiate Greek-letter fraternities established for African Americans.

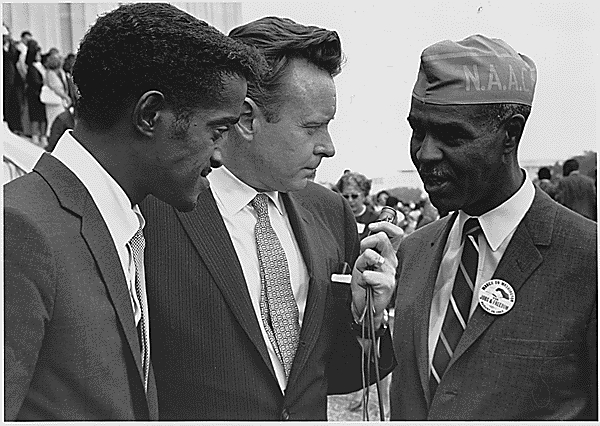
Wilkins (right) with Sammy Davis, Jr. (left) and a reporter at the 1963 Civil Rights March on Washington, D.C.

In 1964, he was awarded the Spingarn Medal by the NAACP.

During his tenure, the NAACP played a pivotal role in leading the nation into the Civil Rights Movement and spearheaded the efforts that led to significant civil rights victories, including Brown v. Board of Education, the Civil Rights Act of 1964, and the Voting Rights Act of 1965.

In 1968, Wilkins also served as chair of the U.S. delegation to the International Conference on Human Rights. After turning 70 in 1971, he faced increased calls to step down as NAACP chief.

Following the April 1968 assassination of Martin Luther King, Jr., Wilkins called for the perpetrator to be apprehended, adding that King's "senseless assassination solves nothing. It will not stay the civil rights movement; it will instead spur it to greater activity."

Wilkins met with President Nixon in February 1969, the latter remarking that he had "found through the years that with Roy Wilkins it is possible to have a very direct and candid discussion. We don't always agree, but he gives excellent advice---advice which many times we follow."

After the sudden death of Whitney Young in March 1971, Wilkins, former President Johnson, Henry Ford II, and Amiri Baraka were chosen as honorary pallbearers to reflect the late civil rights leader's skill in bridging diverse schools of thought.

Wilkins attended the December 1972 symposium sponsored by the Lyndon Baines Johnson Library and Museum coinciding with the opening of the former president's civil rights papers at the library.

In 1977, at the age of 76, Wilkins finally retired from the NAACP and was succeeded by Benjamin Hooks. Wilkins was honored with the title Director Emeritus of the NAACP in the same year.

The players in this drama of frustration and indignity are not commas or semicolons in a legislative thesis; they are people, human beings, citizens of the United States of America.

— Roy Wilkins

== Views ==
Wilkins was a staunch liberal and proponent of American values during the Cold War. He denounced suspected and actual communists within the Civil Rights Movement. He had been criticized by some on the left of the movement, such as Daisy Bates, Paul Robeson, W. E. B. Du Bois, Robert F. Williams, and Fred Shuttlesworth, for his cautious approach, suspicion of grassroots organizations, and conciliatory attitude towards white anticommunism.

In 1951, J. Edgar Hoover and the US State Department, in collusion with the NAACP and Wilkins, who was then the editor of The Crisis, the official magazine of the NAACP, arranged for a ghost-written leaflet to be printed and distributed in Africa. The purpose of the leaflet was to spread negative press and views about the black political radical and entertainer Paul Robeson throughout Africa. Roger P. Ross, a State Department public affairs officer working in Africa, issued three pages of detailed guidelines including the following instructions:

United States Information and Educational Exchange (USIE) in the Gold Coast, and I suspect everywhere else in Africa, badly needs a through-going, sympathetic and regretful but straight talking treatment of the whole Robeson episode... there's no way the Communists score on us more easily and more effectively out here, than on the US. Negro problem in general, and on the Robeson case in particular. And, answering the latter, we go a long way toward answering the former.

The finished article published by the NAACP was called Paul Robeson: Lost Shepherd, and penned under the false name of "Robert Alan", who the NAACP claimed was a "well known New York journalist". Another article by Roy Wilkins, "Stalin's Greatest Defeat", denounced Robeson and the Communist Party USA in terms consistent with the FBI's information.

At the time of Robeson's widely misquoted declaration at the Paris Peace Conference that blacks would not support the United States in a war against the Soviet Union because of the continued lynchings and their legal second-class citizen status after World War II, Wilkins stated that regardless of the number of lynchings that then occurred or would occur, black Americans would always serve in the armed forces.

Wilkins also threatened to cancel a charter of an NAACP youth group in 1952 if it did not cancel its planned Robeson concert.

=== Support for military ===
Wilkins's views towards the participation of black military members in the US military was a point of contention between him and other prominent civil rights leaders. While most civil rights groups and activists stayed quiet or spoke out against the Vietnam War, Wilkins spoke about what he believed African-Americans could gain from serving in the military. An article posted in the Western Journal of Black Studies suggests that black troops were fighting for equality both in the United States as well as overseas. Wilkins emphasized the financial benefits of serving in the military along with the importance of African-American citizens participating in the first integrated American army.

Wilkins's efforts to further equality in the realm of international affairs were publicly recognized in 1969, when he was awarded the Presidential Medal of Freedom by Lyndon Johnson.

== Death and legacy ==
Wilkins died on September 8, 1981, in New York City, at the age of 80, from heart problems related to a pacemaker implanted on him in 1979 because of his irregular heartbeat.. During his later life Wilkins was frequently referred to as the "Senior Statesman" of the Civil Rights Movement.

In 1982, his autobiography Standing Fast: The Autobiography of Roy Wilkins was published posthumously.

The Roy Wilkins Renown Service Award was established in 1980 to recognize members of the Armed Forces who embodied the spirit of equality and human rights. The St. Paul Auditorium was renamed for Wilkins in 1985. The Roy Wilkins Center for Human Relations and Social Justice was established at the University of Minnesota's Hubert H. Humphrey School of Public Affairs in 1992. Roy Wilkins Park in St. Albans, Queens, New York was named after him as a unique public and cultural touchstone for all of New York City.

Gil Scott-Heron mentioned Wilkins in his spoken word song "The Revolution Will Not Be Televised" with this lyric: "There will be no slow motion or still life of Roy Wilkins strolling through Watts in a red, black and green liberation jumpsuit that he has been saving for just the proper occasion." Amiri Baraka stated, in his "Civil Rights Poem", that "if i ever see roywilkins [sic.] on the sidewalks imonna [sic.] stick half my sandal up his ass". In 2001, the U.S. Postal Service issued a 34 cent stamp honoring Wilkins. In 2002, Molefi Kete Asante listed Roy Wilkins on his list of the 100 Greatest African Americans.

He is played by Joe Morton in the 2016 television drama All the Way.

Chris Rock portrayed Wilkins somewhat unfavorably in the 2023 Netflix film Rustin. In the film's final scenes, Wilkins comes around to a more positive view of Bayard Rustin, who is portrayed throughout the film as a Wilkins nemesis during the planning of the March on Washington.

== See also ==
- Civil rights movement (1896–1954)
- Leadership Conference on Civil Rights
- List of civil rights leaders
- Roger Wilkins, nephew of Roy, also a prominent civil rights activist
- Roy Wilkins Auditorium, an arena in Saint Paul, Minnesota
- Timeline of the civil rights movement
- Thurgood Marshall, Wilkins's colleague at the NAACP and U.S. Supreme Court Justice
- March on Washington for Jobs and Freedom
- List of people from Harlem

== Sources ==
- Yvonne Ryan, Roy Wilkins: The Quiet Revolutionary and the NAACP. Lexington, KY: University Press of Kentucky, 2014.
- Arvarh E. Strickland, "Roy Wilkins", American National Biography Online, February 2000.
