= 30th Launch Group =

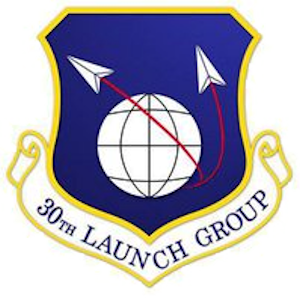
- Emblem of the 30th Launch Group
- Active: 2003-2018
- Country: United States
- Branch: United States Air Force

The 30th Launch Group was a United States Air Force unit, and was assigned to the 30th Space Wing, Vandenberg AFB, California.

== Overview ==
The 30th Launch Group was responsible for booster and satellite technical oversight and launch processing activities to include launch, integration and test operations. The group consisted of an integrated military, civilian and contractor team with more than 250 personnel directly supporting operations from the Western Range.

== Lineage ==
- Established as 30th Launch Group on 28 Oct 2003

Activated on 1 Dec 2003
Inactivated on 20 July 2018

== Assignments ==
- 30th Space Wing, 1 Dec 2003 – 20 Jul 2018

== Units ==
- 2d Space Launch Squadron, 1 Dec 2003 – 31 Oct 2005
- 4th Space Launch Squadron, 1 Dec 2003 – present
- 1st Air and Space Test Squadron, 1 Dec 2003 – present

== Missiles ==
- Titan II, 2003
- Atlas II, 2003
- Titan IV, 2003-2005
- Delta II, 2003-2009
- Minotaur, 2003 – present
- Pegasus, 2003 – present
- Atlas V, 2003 – present
- Delta IV, 2003 – present
