= Alvin Henry =

Trinidad and Tobago sprinter

Alvin Henry (born 29 September 1976) is a former track and field athlete notable for being on Trinidad and Tobago's 4 × 100 metres relay team at the 2000 Summer Olympics. While part of the team, Henry did not actually compete in the event. He was bronze medallist with the relay team at the 2002 Central American and Caribbean Games.

On July 1, 2007, Henry was arrested in New York City for the rape of five women including one 15-year-old girl. He confessed to the charges: he attacked three women in Baisley Pond Park and Roy Wilkins Park in Queens and two others in Prospect Park; the latest attack was on June 15, 2007 in Prospect Park where police say he raped a 34-year-old woman at gunpoint.

On August 8, 2008, Henry pleaded guilty in exchange for a 21-year prison sentence.

== International competitions ==
Year	Competition	Venue	Position	Notes	
Representing Trinidad and Tobago
2002	Central American and Caribbean Games	San Salvador, El Salvador	3rd	4x100m relay	40.08

== See also ==
- Trinidad and Tobago at the 2000 Summer Olympics
