= Roosevelt Mercer Jr. =

United States Air Force general

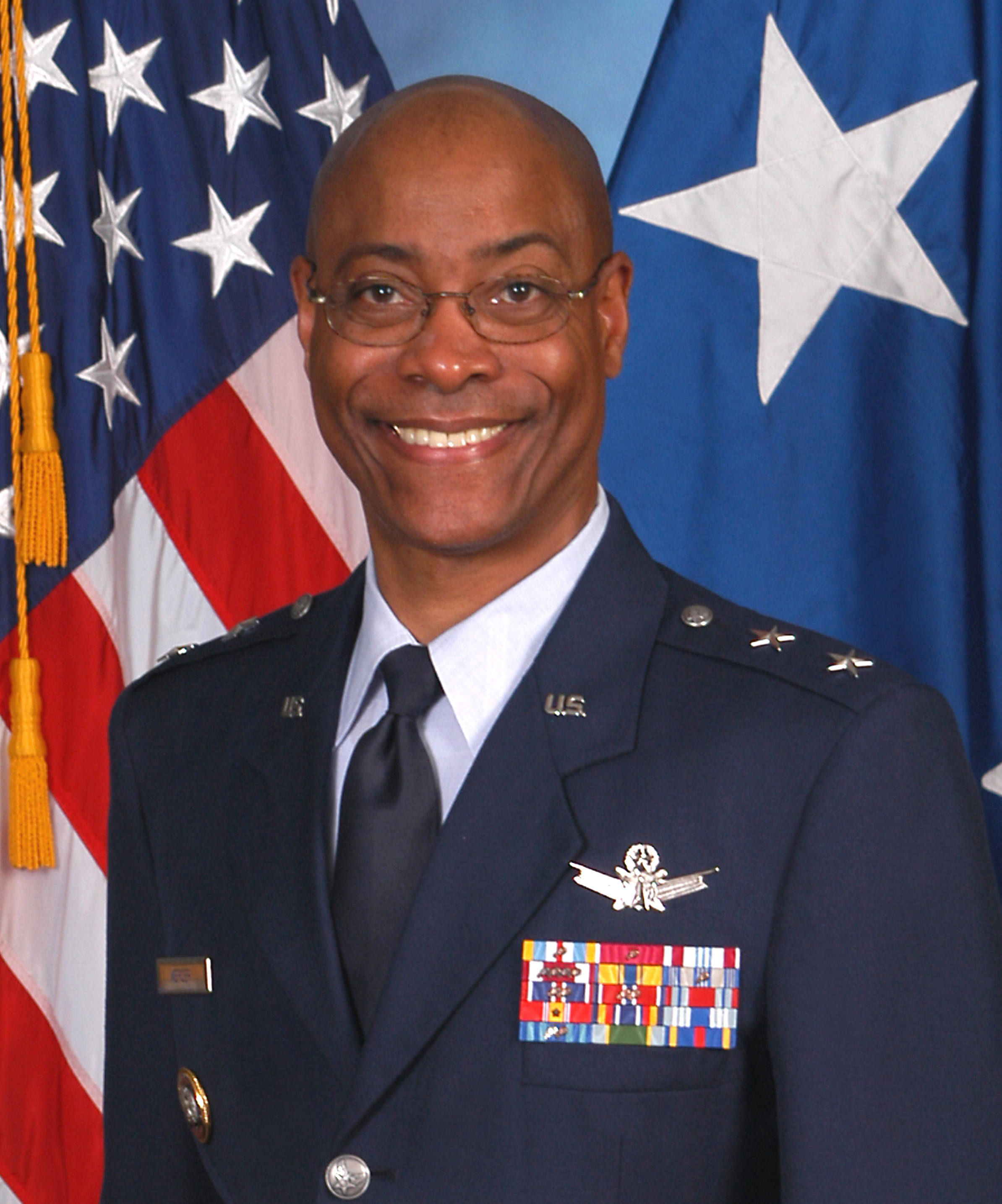
- Military career
- Allegiance: United States of America
- Branch: United States Air Force
- Service years: 1975–2008
- Rank: Major General
- Commands: 81st Training Wing; 30th Space Wing; 447 Strategic Missile Squadron; 381 SMW Logistics Group Commander; Commander, 45 Logistics Group; Commander, 91 Operations Group; Commander, 30th Space Wing; Commander, 81st Training Wing; Commandant, Joint Forces Staff College; Commander, Air Force Element USSTRATCOM
- Awards: Defense Superior Service Medal(2); Legion of Merit(2); Defense Meritorious Service Medal; Meritorious Service Medal(5); Air Force Commendation Medal

Retired Maj. Gen. Roosevelt Mercer Jr., SES, is the director of the Interagency Planning Office (IPO) for the Next Generation Air Transportation System (NextGen) at the Federal Aviation Administration where he provides high-level leadership for interagency and international collaboration related to NextGen. He executes the collaborative processes needed to ensure efficient coordination among all federal partners whose decisions impact NextGen. The federal partner agencies include the National Aeronautics and Space Administration (NASA), Department of Defense (DoD), Department of Homeland Security (DHS), Department of Commerce (DOC), National Transportation Safety Board (NTSB), National Science Foundation (NSF), and Federal Aviation Administration (FAA), as well as the White House Office of Science and Technology Policy (OSTP) and the Office of the Director of National Intelligence (ODNI) as an ex officio participant. Mr. Mercer is charged with providing executive direction to a dynamic multi-agency and international partnering organization focused on future NextGen technology, policy, and collaborative activities.

Prior to joining the FAA in April 2016, Mercer had a successful career in the private sector since 2007. As the vice president and director of government, commercial and international initiatives for Geospatial Systems, a division of ITT Exelis, Mercer was responsible for government / industry partnerships and international initiatives worldwide.

Prior to joining ITT Exelis, Mercer served in the United States Air Force (USAF) for over 32 years (retired January 1, 2008), most recently as director of plans and policy for U.S. Strategic Command at Offutt Air Force Base (AFB) in Nebraska. He was responsible for the development and implementation of national security policy, military strategy, space and weapons employment concepts and policy, as well as joint doctrine as they applied to the command and execution of its missions. Mercer was also responsible for the development of the nation's strategic war plan, strategic support plans for theater combatant commanders, and contingency planning for the Global Strike mission.

Mercer has held command seven times from the squadron to the wing level. Among his many USAF assignments, he served as commander of 447th Strategic Missile Squadron, Grand Forks AFB, North Dakota; commander of 45th Logistics Group, Patrick AFB, Florida; as commander of 30th Space Wing, Vandenberg AFB, California; commander of 81st Training Wing, Biloxi, MS; commander of 91st Operations Group, Minot, N.D.; as vice director of plans, U.S. Space Command, Peterson AFB, Colorado; deputy director of operations, Headquarters Air Force Space Command, Peterson AFB; and as the commandant of Joint Forces Staff College, National Defense University, Norfolk, Virginia; commander of Air Force Element, United States Strategic Command, Offutt AFB, Nebraska.

Mercer entered the U.S. Air Force as a 1975 distinguished graduate of the University of Puget Sound's ROTC program. His educational credentials include a Bachelor of Arts degree in urban planning from the University of Puget Sound, Master of Science in counseling from the University of Oklahoma, post-graduate Executive Programs at Syracuse University, National Defense University, and Harvard University's John F. Kennedy School of Government, as well as a concentrated Executive Financial Development Program at the Wharton School of Business.

Mercer is the vice chairman of the board for the National Strategic Research Institute at the University of Nebraska; chairman of the Military Advisory Board of Directors for Bellevue University, Bellevue, Nebraska; a member of the board of trustees for the Rochester Institute of Technology, Rochester, New York; and a member of the National Association of Governing Boards.

Prior to assuming his current position, Mercer was the director of combat and information operations, Global Operations Directorate, U.S. Strategic Command, Offutt AFB.

== Education ==
- 1975 Bachelor of Arts degree in urban planning, University of Puget Sound, Tacoma, Washington
- 1982 Distinguished graduate, Squadron Officer School, Maxwell AFB, Ala.
- 1985 Master of Science degree in counseling, University of Oklahoma, Norman, Oklahoma
- 1986 Top third graduate Air Command and Staff College, Maxwell AFB, Ala.
- 1995 Air War College, Maxwell AFB, Ala.
- 1997 Senior Executives in National Security Course, Syracuse University, Syracuse, New York
- 2001 Capstone, National Defense University, Fort Lesley J. McNair, Washington, D.C.
- 2002 Senior Executives in National and International Security Course, Harvard Kennedy School, Harvard University, Cambridge, Massachusetts
- 2007 Leadership in Crisis: Preparation and Performance Course, Harvard Kennedy School, Harvard University, Cambridge, Massachusetts
- 2007 Executive Financial Management Program, Wharton School, University of Pennsylvania, Philadelphia

== Assignments ==
- 1. October 1975 - January 1976, student, Titan II missile combat crew training, Sheppard AFB, Texas
- 2. February 1976 - March 1976, student, Titan II initial qualification training, Vandenberg AFB, Calif.
- 3. April 1976 - January 1980, combat missile crew member, 381st Strategic Missile Wing, McConnell AFB, Kan.
- 4. February 1980 - September 1981, instructor, 4315th Combat Crew Training Squadron, Vandenberg AFB, Calif.
- 5. October 1981 - May 1983, Assistant Chief of Protocol, 1st Strategic Aerospace Division, Vandenberg AFB, Calif.
- 6. June 1983 - July 1985, Chief of Missile Career Development, Directorate of Assignments, Headquarters Strategic Air Command, Offutt AFB, Neb.
- 7. July 1985 - June 1986, student, Air Command and Staff College, Maxwell AFB, Ala.
- 8. June 1986 - December 1987, Chief of Congressional Affairs, Deputy Chief of Staff for Personnel, Headquarters United States Air Force, Washington, D.C.
- 9. January 1988 - July 1989, executive officer, Directorate of Personnel Plans, Office of the Deputy Chief of Staff for Personnel, Headquarters U.S. Air Force, Washington, D.C.
- 10. July 1989 - July 1991, Commander, 447th Strategic Missile Squadron, Grand Forks AFB, N.D.
- 11. July 1991 - February 1992, Deputy Commander Maintenance, 321st Maintenance Group, Grand Forks AFB, N.D.
- 12. February 1992 - June 1994, Chief, Nuclear Division, Directorate of Plans and Policy, Headquarters United States European Command, Stuttgart, Germany
- 13. June 1994 - June 1995, student, Air War College, Maxwell AFB, Ala.
- 14. June 1995 - July 1996, commander of 45th Logistics Group, Patrick AFB, Fla.
- 15. July 1996 - January 1998, commander of 91st Operations Group, Minot AFB, N.D.
- 16. January 1998 - May 1998, vice commander of 91st Space Wing, Minot AFB, N.D.
- 17. June 1998 - June 1999, commander of 30th Space Wing, Vandenberg AFB, Calif.
- 18. July 1999 - April 2000, vice director of plans, Directorate of Plans, Headquarters U.S. Space Command, Peterson AFB, Colo.
- 19. May 2000 - August 2000, deputy director of operations, Headquarters Air Force Space Command, Peterson AFB, Colo.
- 20. September 2000 - May 2002, commander of 81st Training Wing, Keesler AFB, Miss.
- 21. May 2002 - January 2003, commandant of Joint Forces Staff College, National Defense University, Norfolk, Va.
- 22. January 2003 - June 2005, director of plans and programs, Headquarters Air Force Space Command, Peterson AFB, Colo.
- 23. June 2005 - June 2006, director of combat and information operations, Global Operations Directorate, U.S. Strategic Command, Offutt AFB, Neb.
- 24. June 2006 – 2008, commander of Air Force Element and director of plans and policy, USSTRATCOM, Offutt AFB, Neb.

== Badges ==
Master Missile Operations Badge Master Space Badge. Weapon systems: Titan II and Minuteman III intercontinental ballistic missiles; Delta, Atlas, Titan II and Titan IV launch vehicles; Eastern Range and Western Range optics, radar, telemetry and command destruct systems

== Other achievements ==
Roy Wilkins Renown Service Award, NAACP, Jaycees' Outstanding Young Man of America, Tribute before the U.S. Senate, Congressional Record, Vol. 148, 2002

== Effective dates of promotion ==
Second Lieutenant June 4, 1975
First Lieutenant October 2, 1977
Captain October 2, 1979
Major May 1, 1985
Lieutenant Colonel June 1, 1989
Colonel January 1, 1993
Brigadier General October 1, 2000
Major General January 1, 2005
