= 2nd Space Launch Squadron =

United States Space Force unit

2nd Space Launch Squadron

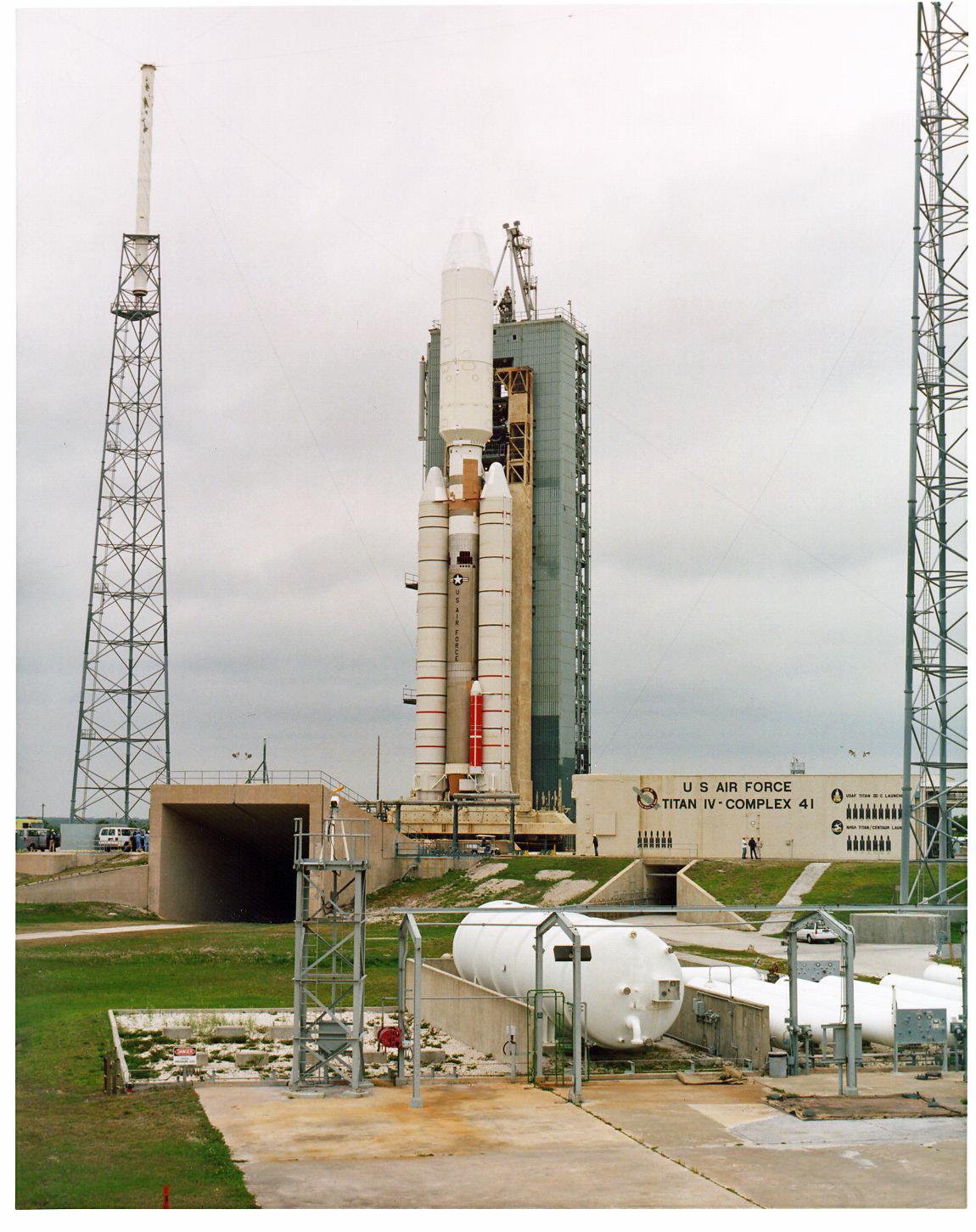
- Titan IV ready to launch
- Active: 1990-2005, 2019-present
- Country: United States
- Branch: United States Space Force
- Role: Launch control
- Motto: Rising Stars (approved 24 May 1995)
- Decorations: Air Force Outstanding Unit Award

Commanders
- Current commander: Lt Col Emily Stanhouse
- Notable commanders: David D. Thompson

Insignia
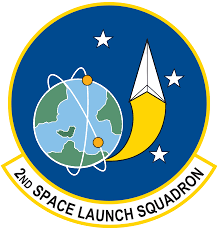
- 2nd Space Launch Squadron emblem (approved 15 January 1991)

The 2nd Space Launch Squadron is an active United States Space Force unit. It is located at Vandenberg Space Force Base, California, and was reactivated in July 2019 with the merger of the 4th Space Launch Squadron and the 1st Air and Space Test Squadron.

== History ==
When founded, the two launch squadrons at Vandenberg Air Force Base divided launch duties, with the 4th Space Launch Squadron working with Titan II and Titan IV vehicles while the 2nd worked with Delta II, Atlas, and other launch vehicles. On 18 May 1998, the two squadrons merged into the 2nd SLS. The merged squadron was responsible for all launch operations at Vandenberg AFB. The reason for the merger was the similarity in missions performed by both units. It was inactivated after the last Titan IV launch. In June 2019 the 4th Space Launch Squadron and the 1st Air and Space Test Squadron merged and reactivated as the 2nd Space Launch Squadron. The reestablished unit took on all the missions of both the 1st Air and Space Test Squadron and the 4th Space Launch Squadron. the 2nd Space Launch Squadron was one of only two space launch squadrons in the U.S. Air Force. the other being the 5th Space launch Squadron at Cape Canaveral.

Both space launch squadrons are now part of the U.S. Space Force.

== Lineage ==
- Constituted as the 2d Space Launch Squadron on 11 September 1990

Activated on 1 October 1990
Inactivated on 31 October 2005
Activated on 1 June 2019

=== Assignments ===
- Western Space and Missile Center, 1 October 1990
- 30th Operations Group, 19 November 1991
- 30th Launch Group, 1 December 2003 - 31 October 2005
- 30th Operations Group, 1 June 2019

=== Stations ===
- Vandenberg Air Force Base, California, 1 October 1990 – 31 October 2005; 1 June 2019 - present

== Aircraft and missiles ==
- Atlas E
- Atlas IIAS
- Delta II
- Titan IV
- Titan II, 1 October 1990 – 2005

== Decorations ==
Air Force Outstanding Unit Award

- 1 November 1991 - 30 September 1993

== List of commanders ==
- Lt Col Clinton Crosier, July 2001–July 2003
- Lt Col David D. Thompson, June 2002–July 2004
- Lt Col Brian Chatman, June 2018-July 2020
- Lt Col Ken Peters, July 2020-June 2022
- Lt Col Shane Rexius, June 2022-21 June 2024
- Lt Col Andrew Singleton, 21 June 2024-25 June 2026
- Lt Col Emily Stanhouse 25 June 2026- present
