= Roy Wilkins Park =

Public park in Queens, New York

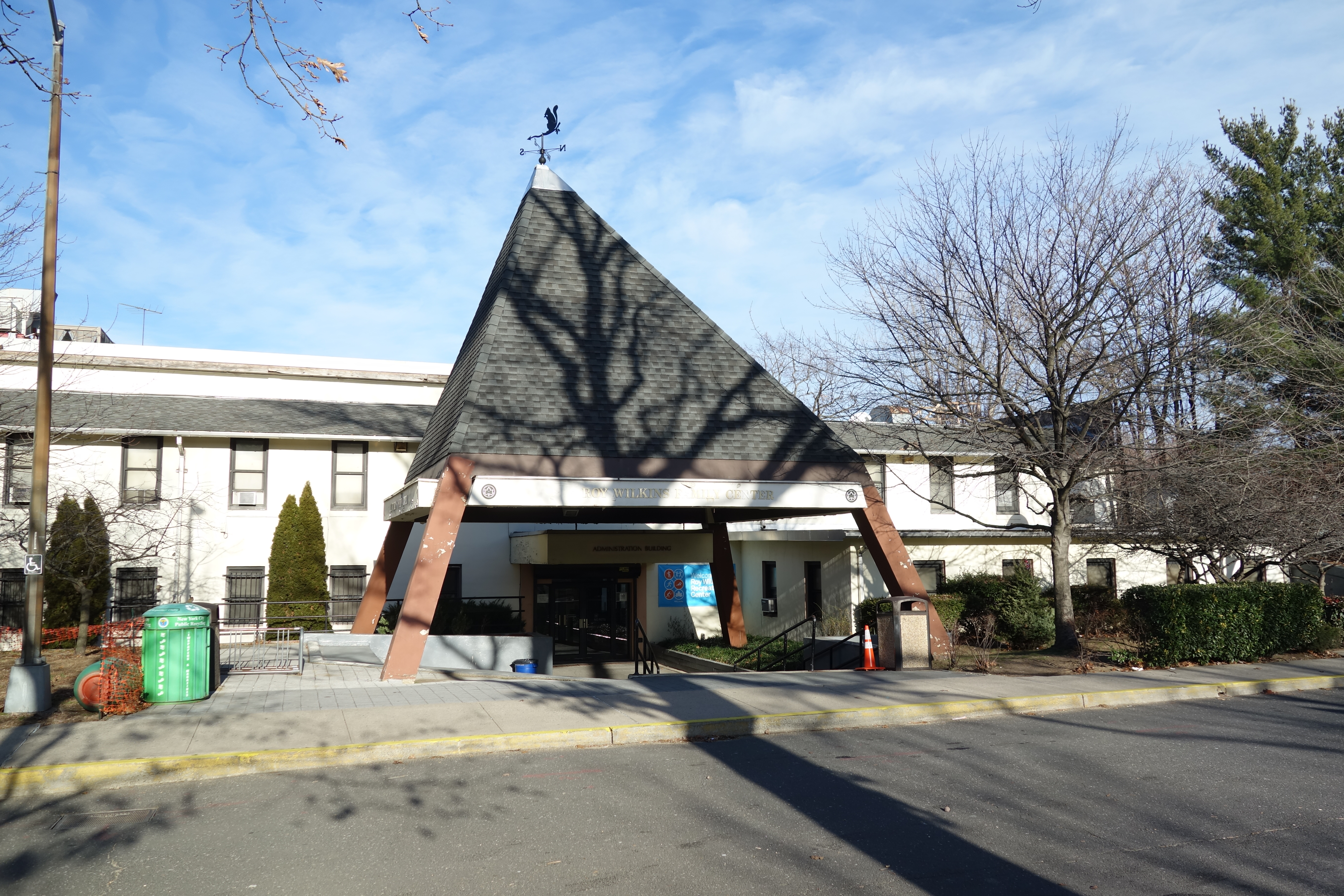
- Roy Wilkins Family Center
- Interactive map of Roy Wilkins Park
- Location: St. Albans, Queens, New York, US
- Coordinates: 40°41′16″N 73°46′20″W
- Area: 53 acres (21 ha)
- Created: 1977
- Operator: New York City Department of Parks and Recreation
- Open: 6 a.m. to 1 a.m.
- Status: open

Roy Wilkins Park, originally known as Southern Queens Park, is a 54-acre (22 ha) park in the St. Albans neighborhood of southeastern Queens in New York City. It is located on an irregular plot of land bounded by 115th and 116th Avenues to the north, 175th Street to the west, Merrick Boulevard to the southwest, Baisley Boulevard to the southeast, and the St. Albans Community Living Center to the east. Roy Wilkins Park contains the Roy Wilkins Recreation Center, a community center with an indoor swimming pool. It also includes various outdoor sporting facilities, a playground, and an artificial pond.

The land, formerly part of the St. Albans Naval Hospital, was given to the New York City government in 1977. Because of the city's financial shortfalls, caused by the 1975 New York City fiscal crisis, the land was leased to the Southern Queens Park Association (SQPA), which originally maintained the park. Roy Wilkins Park was named for civil rights activist Roy Wilkins in 1982, and the recreational center opened on the site in 1986. Throughout the years, Roy Wilkins Park has held numerous events and concerts. The New York City Department of Parks and Recreation took over control of the park from the SQPA between 2022 and 2025, and a new recreation center was planned during that decade.

== Description ==
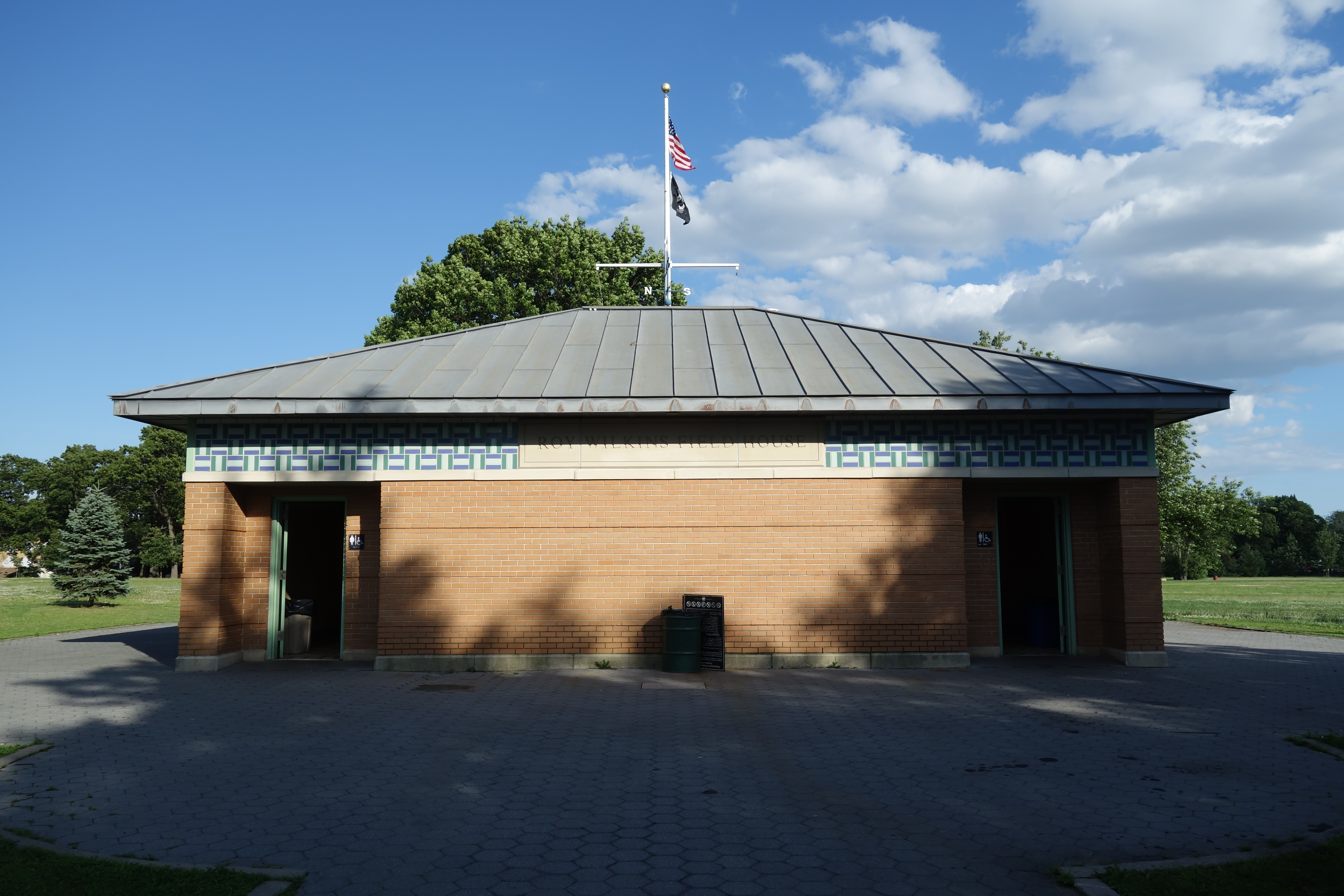
The park's field house

Roy Wilkins Park is located in St. Albans, south of Downtown Jamaica and east of South Jamaica. According to the New York City Department of Parks and Recreation, it occupies 53 acres (21 ha), though the precise area is 56.83 acres (23.00 ha). However, other sources such as The New York Times say that Roy Wilkins Park covers 54 acres (22 ha). The park is sometimes also known as the Southern Queens Park, its original name prior to 1982.

=== Family center ===
The Roy Wilkins Family Center is a 50,000-square-foot (4,600 m^{2}) building that was part of the St. Albans Naval Hospital. The Family Center is located near the eastern corner of the park, near Baisley Boulevard and 119th Road. Its largest feature is an Olympic-size swimming pool, but the center also houses other programs and events, including a daytime summer camp, after-school activities, and counseling.

The Black Spectrum Theatre, a 325-seat or 425-seat theater with piano and film rooms, is located next to the recreation center. It is occupied by the Black Spectrum Theatre Company, which was founded in 1970 and is the largest African American theater company in Queens. The troupe moved to Roy Wilkins Park in 1986. An African-American Hall of Fame is also located outside the family center; it contains 400-pound (180 kg) medallions of such figures as Ralph Bunche, a diplomat, and Shirley Chisholm, the first black female United States Representative.

=== Play facilities ===
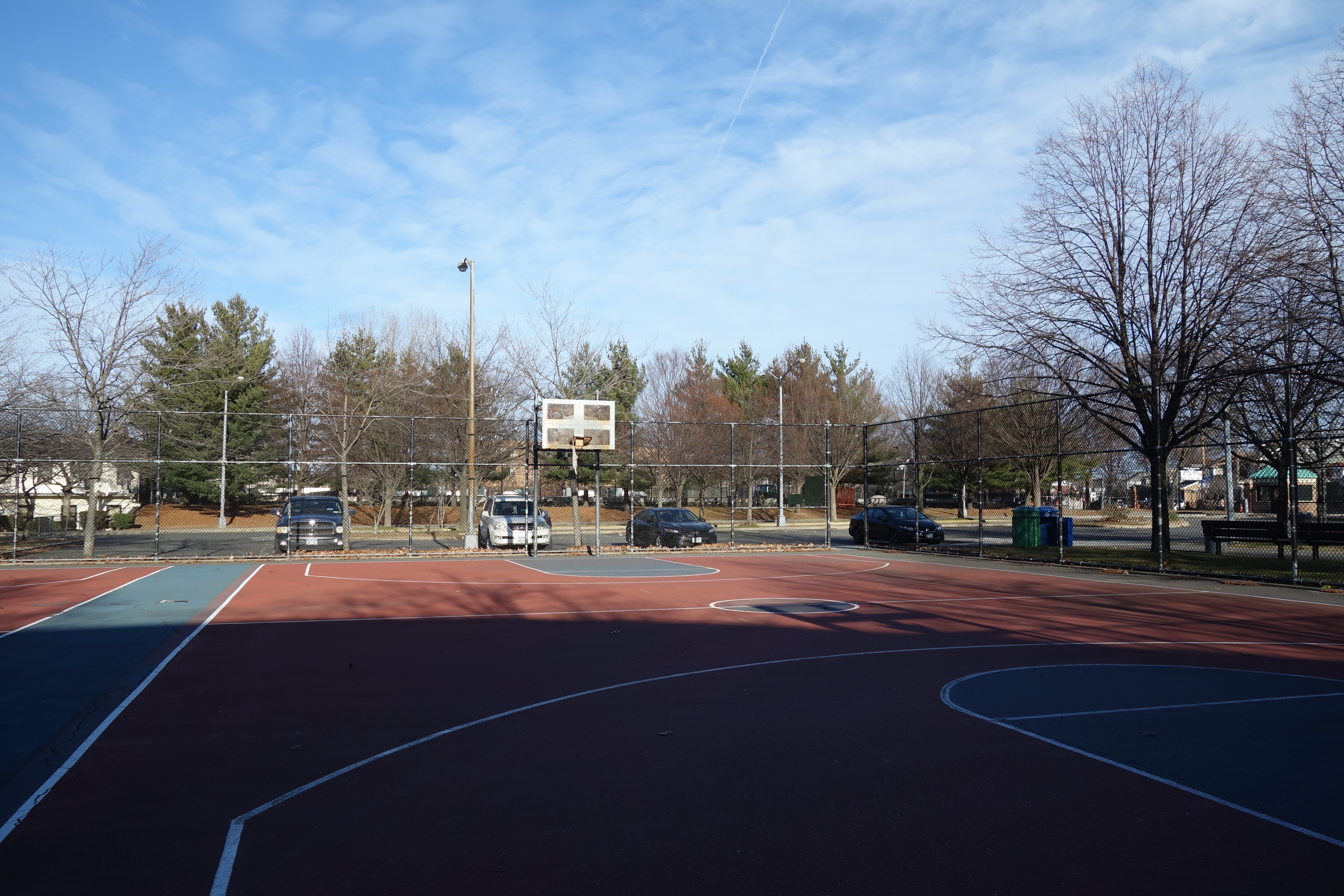
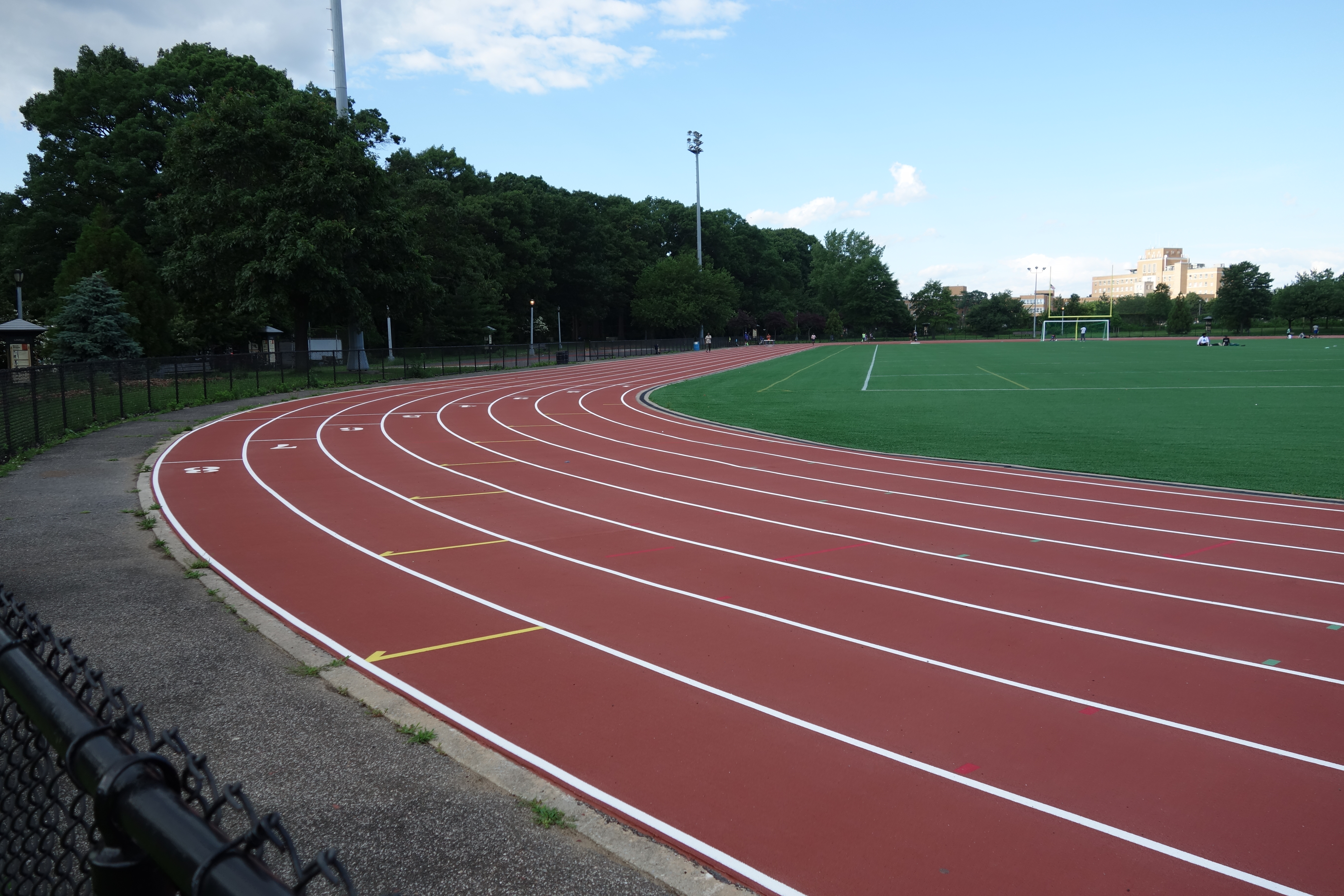
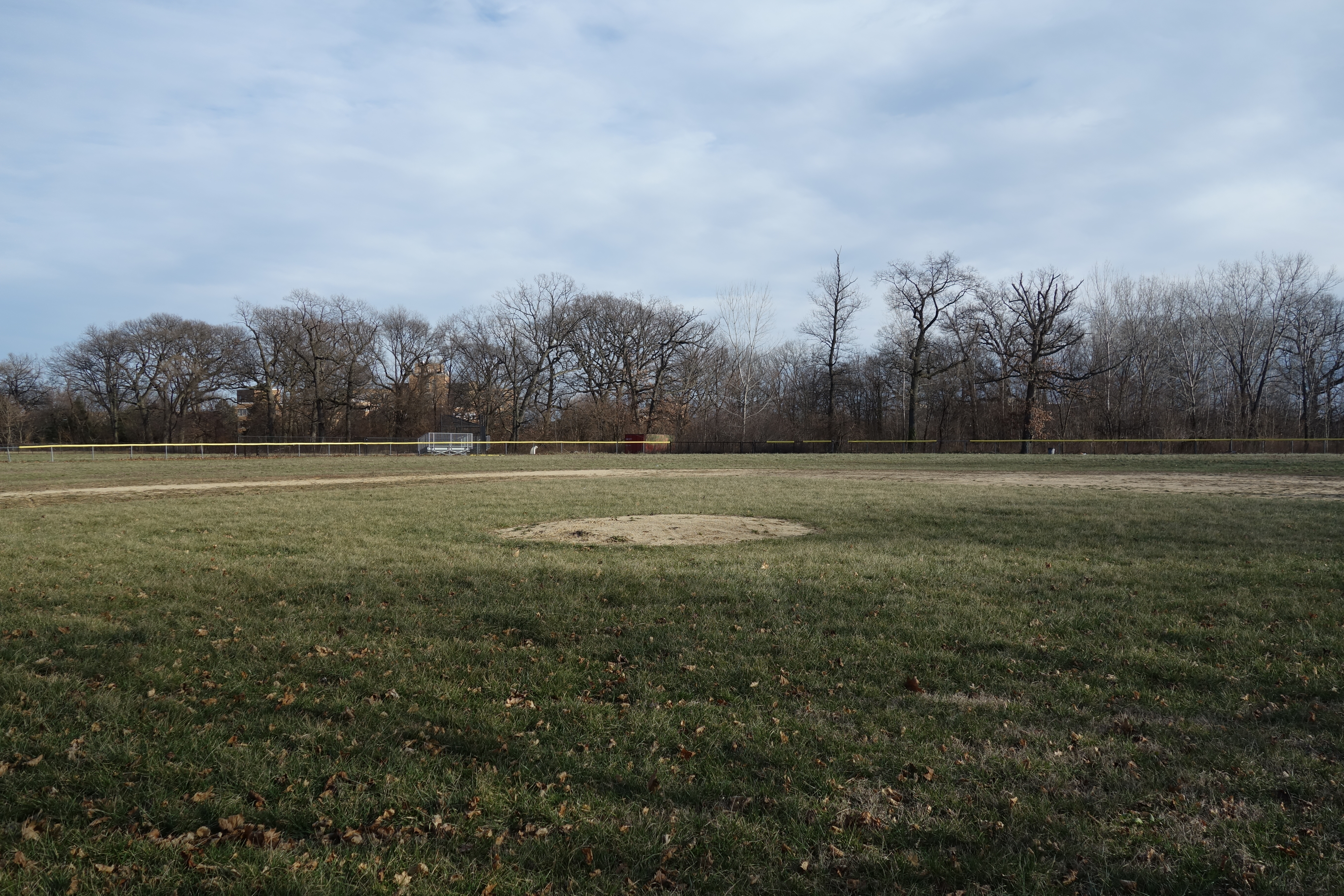
Basketball court, running track, and baseball field in Roy Wilkins Park

Close to the southern corner of Roy Wilkins Park are two baseball fields, two tennis/handball courts, two basketball courts, and play equipment. An additional six tennis/handball courts, four batting cages, four basketball courts, more play equipment, and restrooms are located on the eastern border of the park, directly to the north and facing Baisley Boulevard. To the northeast is a parking lot and the Roy Wilkins Family Center.

The central part of Roy Wilkins Park, near Merrick Boulevard, contains additional parking. There are also three cricket pitches, a running track, and restrooms. During the 1990s, hurdler Dalilah Muhammad had used the park's track-and-field facilities while growing up in Queens. The northern part of Roy Wilkins Park, facing 175th Street to the west and 115th Avenue to the north, contains additional parking as well as two baseball fields.

=== Other features ===
An artificial pond is located toward the southeastern end of Roy Wilkins Park. The unnamed pond was created in 1997.

A 4-acre (1.6 ha) vegetable garden is also located within the park, and is among New York City's largest community gardens, with 400 plots. The garden was established in 1980 on the site of the former Naval Hospital barracks. By the 1990s, the vegetable garden was annually growing $300,000 worth of produce. The plants are typically used by the individuals or families that grow each plot and are not for wholesale use.

== History ==
=== Site ===
The site was originally occupied by the St. Albans Golf Course and Country Club, which was completed in 1915. The club hosted the 1930 Metropolitan Amateur. The land was seized for the construction of St. Albans Naval Hospital in 1942, and the hospital started operating the next year. In the late 1940s, the temporary structures on the hospital site were replaced with more permanent structures.

After the Vietnam War, St. Albans Naval Hospital saw gradual personnel cuts, and it was ordered to be closed in 1973. After the announcement of the hospital's closure, several plans were proposed for the site. The United States Department of Agriculture wanted to use the site as a regional quarantine center, having searched for possible locations since 1964. Another proposal was to turn the abandoned buildings into a veterans' hospital. In 1974, it was announced that part of the hospital, comprising 74 acres (30 ha) of the hospital's 117-acre (47 ha) total, would be turned over to the General Services Administration and become a United States Department of Veterans Affairs facility. At the time, all naval hospital patients had been relocated to other facilities, and the barracks were set to be demolished. The St. Albans VA Hospital opened in 1976 and is still operating. The VA subsequently offered the unoccupied portion of the land to the city for use as a city park.

=== Park establishment ===
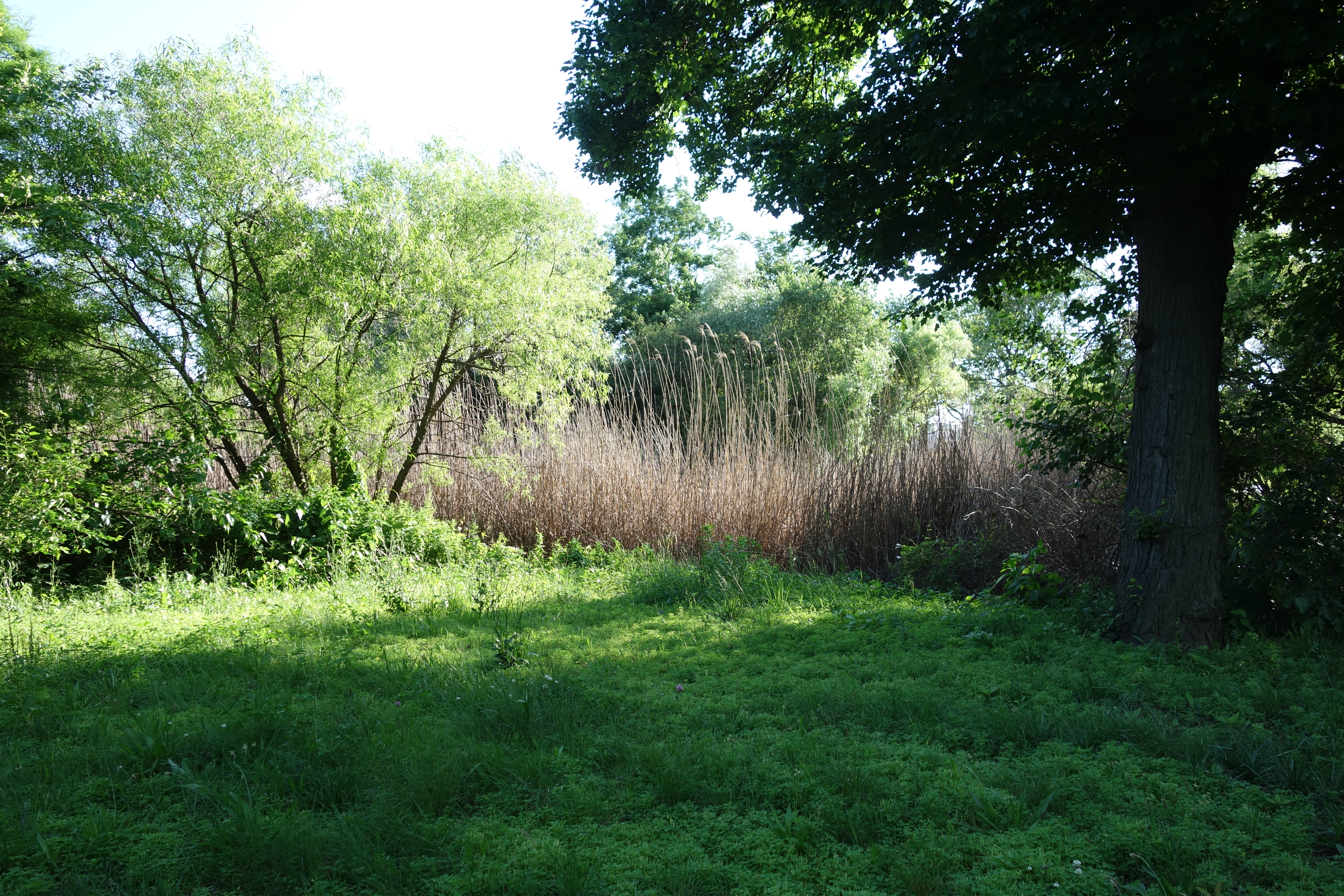
Vegetation near the park's pond

The Southern Queens Park Association (SQPA), composed of twelve community groups, was involved with the initial creation of the park, which was mainly the idea of the association's executive director Solomon Goodrich. The association's chairman, former New York City deputy mayor Paul Gibson, made an agreement for the association to lease the land from the city, as long as the New York City Department of Parks and Recreation funded improvements. Both men sought to make the land available to the majority-black populations in the surrounding area; one of Goodrich's goals was to "mobilize the blacks of St. Albans to help pull up the blacks of South Jamaica". Donald Manes, the Queens borough president, wrote a letter to the New York State Office of Parks, Recreation and Historic Preservation, advocating the construction of a park on the remaining portion of the St. Albans Naval Hospital site. However, the 1975 New York City fiscal crisis meant that the city's government did not have funds to redevelop the property. At the time, the unused land was seen as a "wasteland" with trash and vandalism amid the vacant buildings. A New York Daily News article later described the site as having 18 "rat-infested" buildings and "a leaking swimming pool full of dead dogs".

The Southern Queens Park was founded on the property in 1976. Maintenance duties passed to the SQPA, who leased the park from the city for $1 a year. The New York Youth Board provided a $200,000 grant to clean up the park, which had been vandalized while the land had been in disputed during the previous four years, while another $400,000 was provided in community development funds. The United States Army Corps of Engineers started clearing the unused barracks, and volunteers began cleaning up the park, though there was limited funding available to renovate the recreational facilities. A flower and vegetable garden operated by senior citizens was established in the Southern Queens Park in 1980, and a jobs program for youth was also started. The city started contributing funds once its fiscal crisis was resolved, and in 1980, entered into a public–private partnership with the SQPA to maintain the Southern Queens Park. On June 29, 1982, the park was renamed after NAACP leader Roy Wilkins, a longtime Queens resident who had died the previous year.

Starting in the mid-1980s, the city spent $5 million on converting one of St. Albans Naval Hospital's buildings into the Roy Wilkins Family Center. Work started in 1983, and it was supposed to be completed the next year at a cost of $3.7 million. However, the Family Center was not dedicated until April 1986 at a final cost of $10 million. The swimming pool opened in August of that year, becoming the first indoor public pool in southeast Queens. The Spectrum Theatre Company moved to a space adjacent to the Family Center the same year. In 1991, the local Little League built new baseball diamonds. At the time, a further $12 to $15 million program of improvements in the park was delayed to the city's early-1990s fiscal crisis.

=== Later years ===
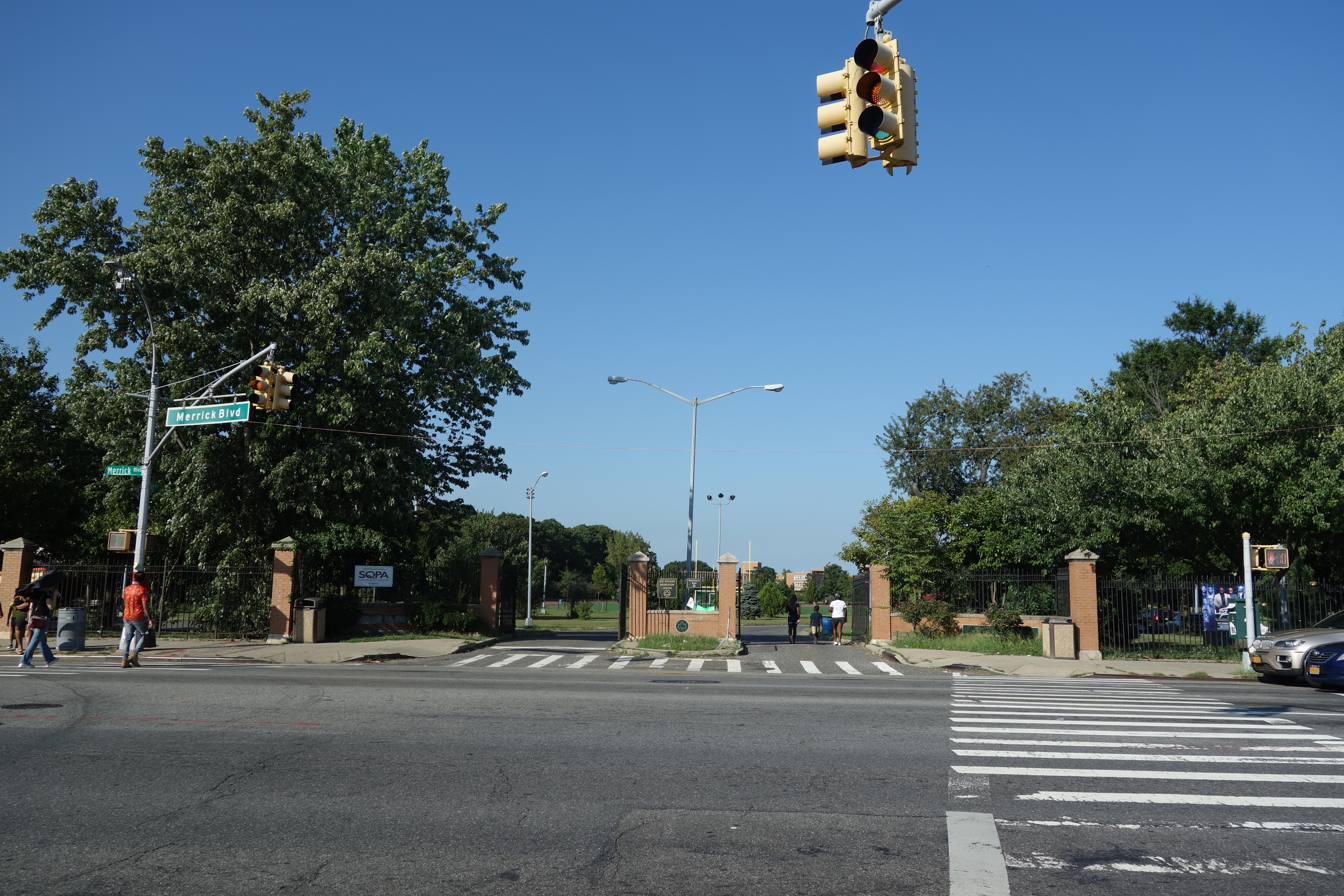
Main entrance to the park at Foch and Merrick Boulevards

In 1988, Queens borough president Claire Shulman announced that the African American Hall of Fame would be founded at Roy Wilkins Park. The first inductee was Wilkins, who was named to the Hall of Fame in 1989, followed by diplomat Ralph Bunche the next year. The Hall of Fame was originally located within the Family Center's courtyard. By the early 1990s, Goodrich hoped to build a structure for the Hall of Fame, which might possible contain memorabilia of such prominent African-American residents of Queens, such as Louis Armstrong, Malcolm X, and Jackie Robinson. However, the building would cost about $4–5 million, funds that were not available at the time. In 1999, the U.S. representative for the area, Gregory Meeks, requested $5 million for a Hall of Fame building, which he said would be the only one of its kind in the United States. This request was made following president Bill Clinton's signing of the National Underground Railroad Network to Freedom Act the previous year. According to the SPQA's website, the Hall of Fame building was not erected because funding priorities had shifted after the September 11 attacks in 2001.

By the early 1990s, Goodrich said that the park was a boon for South Jamaica, which at the time was majority-black and primarily lower-class. The region had long been neglected by city officials, having been "perceived as being part of an affluent middle-class community in Queens", namely the predominantly black neighborhood of St. Albans. To reduce danger in the park, the SQPA kept the park brightly lit, and gave its members walkie-talkies. The SQPA continued to make major renovations to the park, including adding baseball fields, soccer/football fields, tennis courts, and a gym. However, funding for the park was decreased by 60% in 1995 following a citywide fiscal crisis. Despite a radiothon that raised $40,000 for the park, security and maintenance funds were halved, and the park's free summer program for kids started charging $100 per child. An artificial pond in the park was created in 1997. The project also included the construction of a new stage for the theater.

NYC Parks released a plan in 2017 to restore the stage for $450,000, as part of a participatory-budgeting process wherein residents voted on projects that needed the most funding. A reconstruction of the park's track and field facility was finished in 2018. The next year, $2 million was allocated for upgrades to Nautilus Playground. NYC Parks also planned to renovate the Family Center's gymnasium starting in March 2020, but this was delayed due to the COVID-19 pandemic. The SQPA maintained the park until October 2021, when NYC Parks took over; the SQPA was attempting to regain control of Roy Wilkins Park by the next year. The office of mayor Bill de Blasio also allocated $92 million in 2021 for a new recreation center, which would be located between 116th Avenue and Baisley Boulevard, with a gym and multipurpose spaces. A request for proposals for the recreation center was launched in 2024, and a design-build contract for the recreation center was awarded the next year. The SQPA also regained control of the park in early 2025. By then, the park was in a state of neglect; the existing recreation center had a nonfunctioning ceiling system and missing ceiling tiles.

== Events and programming ==
Over the years, Roy Wilkins Park has held numerous events such as concerts; by 1999, the park's programs were drawing 100,000 visitors per year. Festivals have included the Groovin in the Park Festival, an annual event with reggae and R&B music, as well as Jamaican Jerk Festival, a Caribbean cuisine and culture event. The park also hosts events such as yoga and fitness challenges and a music program. Since 2003, Roy Wilkins Recreation Center has also hosted the annual Art Exhibit at Roy Wilkins Park, showing work from black artists. In the past, Roy Wilkins Park has also hosted such events as the Family Festival, a "Celebrating the Environment" festival, and the Queens Jazz Festival.

== Incidents ==
Roy Wilkins Park has been the site of numerous incidents and crimes. A body of a woman who had been missing for ten years was found in the park in 1998. Alvin Henry, an Olympic sprinter from Trinidad and Tobago, was accused in 2007 of at least two rapes in Roy Wilkins Park. Additionally, in 2014, a gang member was killed in the park by a member of a rival gang.

In 2026, Jaden Pierre was beaten, shot, and killed at the park. Former mayor of N.Y.C, Eric Adams, publicized video of the incident.

== See also ==
- Community gardens in New York City
