= 30th Space Communications Squadron =

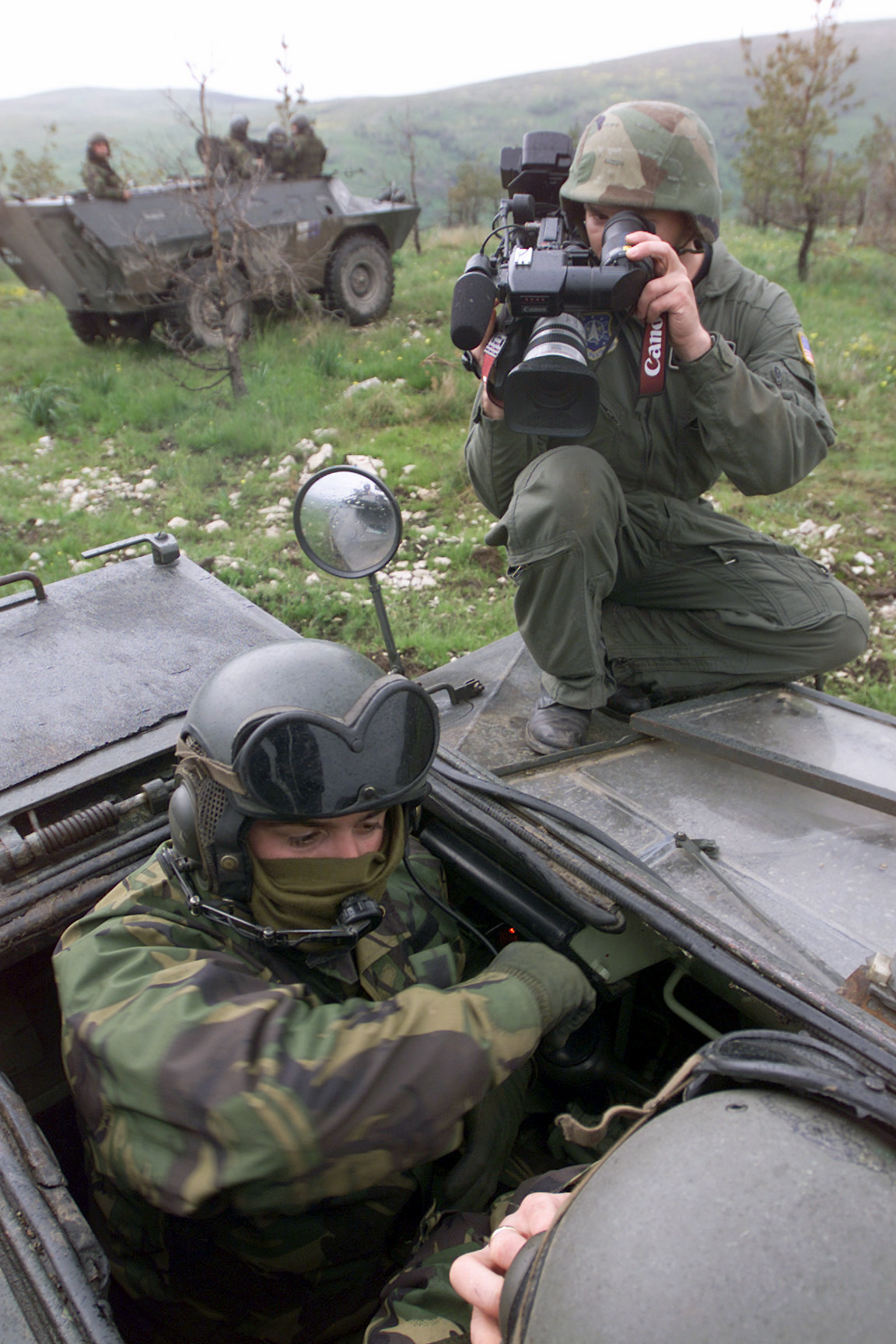
- A squadron videographer documents Portuguese Army soldiers during Exercise Iberian Resolve at Camp Butmir, Bosnia Herzegovina.
- Active: 1946–1970; 1991–2024
- Country: United States
- Branch: United States Space Force
- Type: Squadron
- Role: Communications support
- Part of: Space Launch Delta 30
- Garrison/HQ: Vandenberg Space Force Base
- Mottos: One Force, Many Strengths
- Mascot: gryphon
- Decorations: Air Force Outstanding Unit Award

Insignia
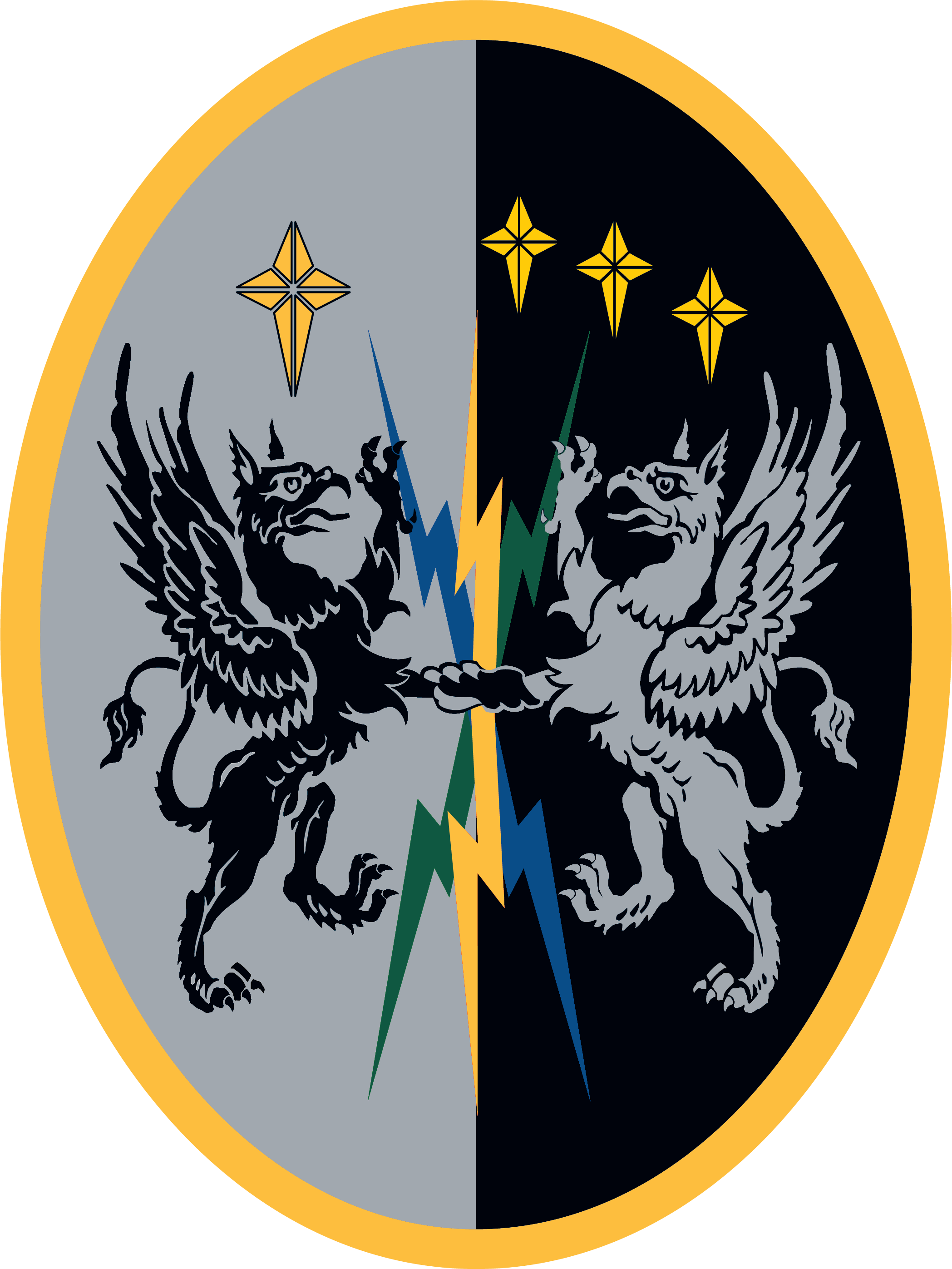
- 30th Space Communications Squadron emblem (Note: Approved in 2021. The prominent gold border represents Space Systems Command, the United States Space Force Field Command to which the 30th Space Communications Squadron was assigned. The divided oval symbolizes day and night and indicates the twenty-four hour services provided by the squadron. The gryphons, a mythological combination of two creatures represent the strength, diversity and teamwork of the squadron in the accomplishment of its missions. The three lightning bolts denote visual, voice and data services and reflect the power and synergy released by squadron unity and teamwork. The larger star represents the mission. The other three smaller stars indicate the personnel; military, government civilian, and contract support of the organization. Together, they suggest the direction and vision of the squadron's goals.)

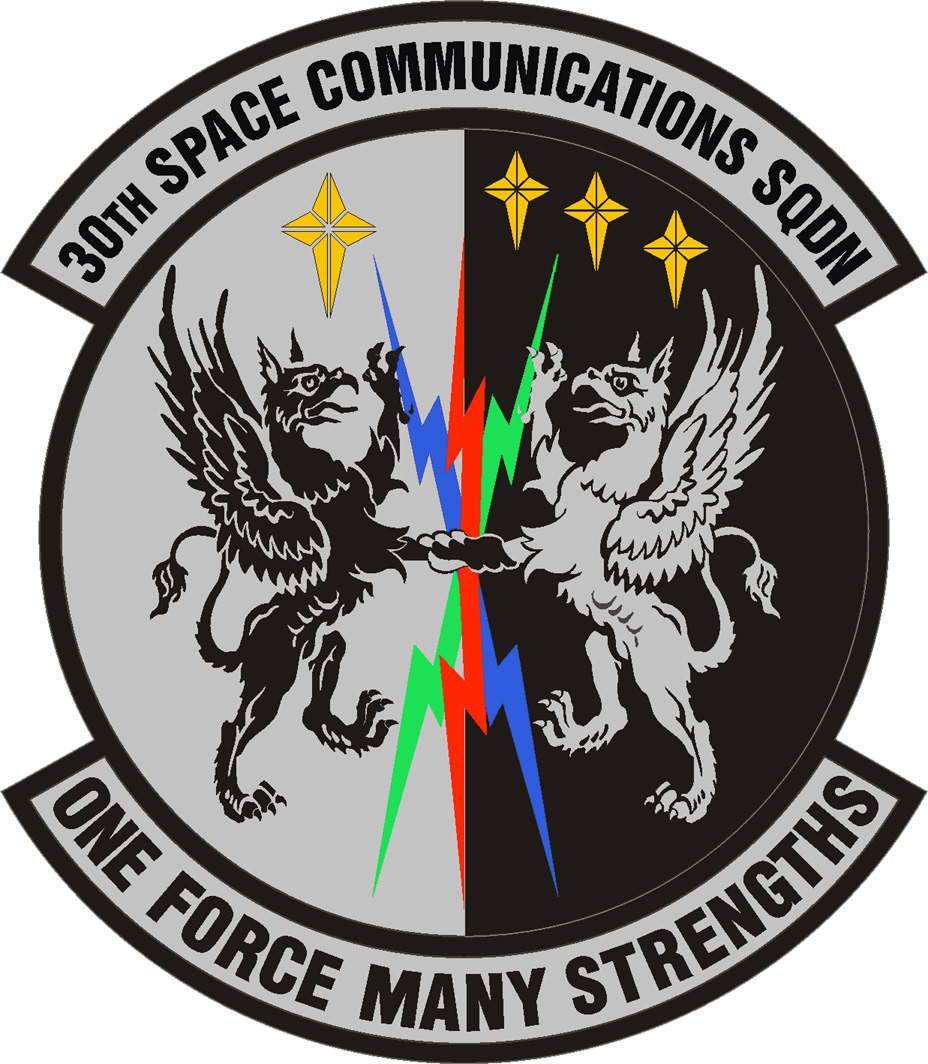
- 30th Communications Squadron emblem (Note: Approved 30 September 1996. The designation on the tab was updated in 2002 and in 2018, the tabs with the motto and designation were reversed.)

The 30th Space Communications Squadron was a United States Space Force unit, last assigned to Space Launch Delta 30 at Vandenberg Space Force Base, California, under the Space Systems Command. The unit was inactivated on 17 October 2024.

It was first activated in 1946 as the 30th Communications Squadron to provide communications support to Strategic Air Command. It continued this mission until 1970, when the mission was absorbed by the 1st Aerospace Communications Group. It was most recently activated at Vandenberg in 1991.

== Mission ==
Provide cyber, communications, and mobile optics support to Space Launch Delta 30 and Vandenberg tenant units through responsive and secure delivery of voice, video, and data information services and technologies.

== Squadron Structure ==
- 30th Space Communications Squadron
  - Operations Flight
  - Plans and Resources Flight
  - Special Missions Flight

== History ==
The squadron was activated at Andrews Field, Maryland in October 1946 as the 30th Communications Squadron, Air Force. (Note: This squadron is not related to the 30th Communications Squadron, Depot, that was activated at Kelly Air Force Base, Texas in November 1950 to provide communications support for the 30th Air Depot Wing, moved to England in 1951 and was inactivated in 1953.) The squadron's mission was to provide communications support for Headquarters, Strategic Air Command (SAC). It moved with SAC to Offutt Air Force Base, Nebraska in November 1948.

The squadron was reassigned to the host unit at Offutt, the 3902nd Air Base Wing, in August 1950, although SAC retained operational control of the squadron. In November 1954, the squadron was redesgnated the 30th Communications Squadron, Command, recogniing the level of support it provided. In February 1960, communications support for SAC was expanded as the 1st Communications Group was formed at Offutt and assumed that responsibility, and the 30th was reassigned to it. The 1st Aerospace Communications Group absorbed the functions of its subordinate units in October 1970, and the squadron was inactivated. When the Air Force eliminated redundant and obsolete units in 1983, it was formally disbanded.

The unit was reconstituted as the 30th Communications Squadron and activated at Vandenberg Air Force Base, on 1 November 1991 and was assigned to the 30th Support Group. It was reassigned to the 30th Logistics Group on 15 March 1999 (later the 30th Maintenance Group), then to the 30 Operations Group on 1 December 2003. With the establishment of the United States Space Force, the organizational hierarchy eliminated the group echelon, and the squadron became a direct report to Space Launch Delta 30 of Space Systems Command on 14 May 2021.

The squadron was inactivated on 17 October 2024 with its functions assumed by the 30th Base Communications Directorate in a Space Force wide reorganization of cyber resources.

== Lineage ==
- Constituted as the 30th Communications Squadron, Air Force on 8 October 1946

Activated on 17 October 1946
Redesignated 30th Communications Squadron, Command, on 8 November 1954
Inactivated on 1 October 1970
Disbanded on 15 June 1983
Reconstituted and redesignated 30th Communications Squadron on 1 November 1991
Activated on 19 November 1991
Redesignated 30th Space Communications Squadron on 1 October 2002
Inactivated c. 17 October 2024

=== Stations ===
- Andrews Field (later Andrews Air Force Base), Maryland, 17 October 1946
- Offutt Air Force Base, Nebraska, 9 November 1948 – 1 October 1970
- Vandenberg Air Force Base (later Vandenberg Space Force Base), California, 19 November 1991 – c. 17 October 2024

=== Assignments ===
- Strategic Air Command, 17 October 1946
- 3902nd Air Base Wing (remained under operational control of Strategic Air Command), 16 August 1950
- 1st Communications Group, Command (later 1 Aerospace Communications Group), 1 February 1960 – 1 October 1970
- 30th Support Group, 19 November 1991
- 30th Logistics Group (later 30th Maintenance Group), 15 March 1999
- 30th Operations Group, 1 December 2003
- Space Launch Delta 30, 14 May 2021 – c. 17 October 2024

=== Commanders ===
Years	30 SCS Commander
2002 - 2004	Lt Col Daniel Birrenkott, USAF
2004 - 2006	Lt Col Alan Claypool, USAF
2006 - 2008	Lt Col Christina Anderson, USAF
2008 - 2010	Lt Col Michael Dombrowski, USAF
2010 - 2012	Lt Col Youngkun Yu, USAF
2012 - 2014	Lt Col Katrina Terry, USAF
2014 - 2015	Lt Col Michael Myers, USAF
2015 - 2016	Lt Col Blake Jeffries, USAF
2016 - 2018	Lt Col Matthew Hyland, USAF
2018 - 2020	Lt Col Ryan White, USAF
2020 – 2022	Lt Col Jason Fields, USAF
2022 - Present	Lt Col Mark DeYoung, USSF
