= John G. Witherspoon =

American military officer (1939–1994)

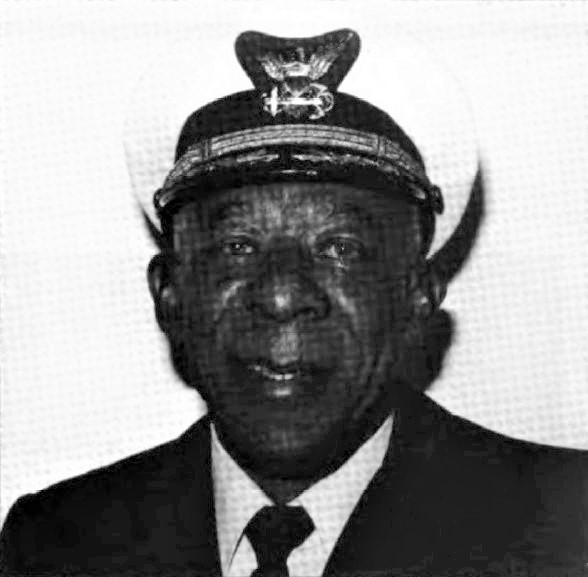
- Witherspoon in 1993
- Born: August 26, 1939; Yadkin Valley, North Carolina, U.S.
- Died: January 4, 1994 (aged 54); New Orleans, Louisiana, U.S.
- Other names: John Gordon Witherspoon; John G. Witherspoon; Papa Spoon
- Occupation: sailor
- Known for: Only the second individual of African-American descent to command a Coast Guard Cutter

John Gordon Witherspoon Sr. (August 26, 1939 – January 4, 1994) was a distinguished sailor in the United States Coast Guard. Born in Yadkin Valley, North Carolina and raised in Lenoir, North Carolina, Witherspoon started his military career in the United States Army and later enlisted in the Coast Guard in 1963, where, after promotion to Quartermaster First Class, he was invited to attended Officer training school, and was commissioned an ensign, in 1971. Witherspoon would eventually command three Coast Guard cutters, Mallow, Valiant and Dependable, and rise to the rank of captain. He was only the second individual of African-American descent to command a cutter, and was the first individual of African-American descent to command a Coast Guard base.

Witherspoon died on January 4, 1994, in New Orleans, Louisiana and was buried at Arlington National Cemetery.

== Legacy ==
In 1994 the National Association for the Advancement of Colored People (NAACP), named Witherspoon and a Coast Guard colleague Cynthia M. Morris, as recipients of the Roy Wilkins Renown Service Award for their achievements in civil rights.

The Coast Guard established an annual award for distinguished leadership named after Witherspoon.

In 2010, Charles "Skip" W. Bowen, who was then the Coast Guard's most senior non-commissioned officer, proposed that all the cutters in the Sentinel class should be named after enlisted sailors in the Coast Guard, or one of its precursor services, who were recognized for their heroism. In 2019 the Coast Guard announced that John Witherspoon would be the namesake of the 58th cutter, USCGC John Witherspoon.
