= Space Launch Delta 30 =

United States Space Force launch unit

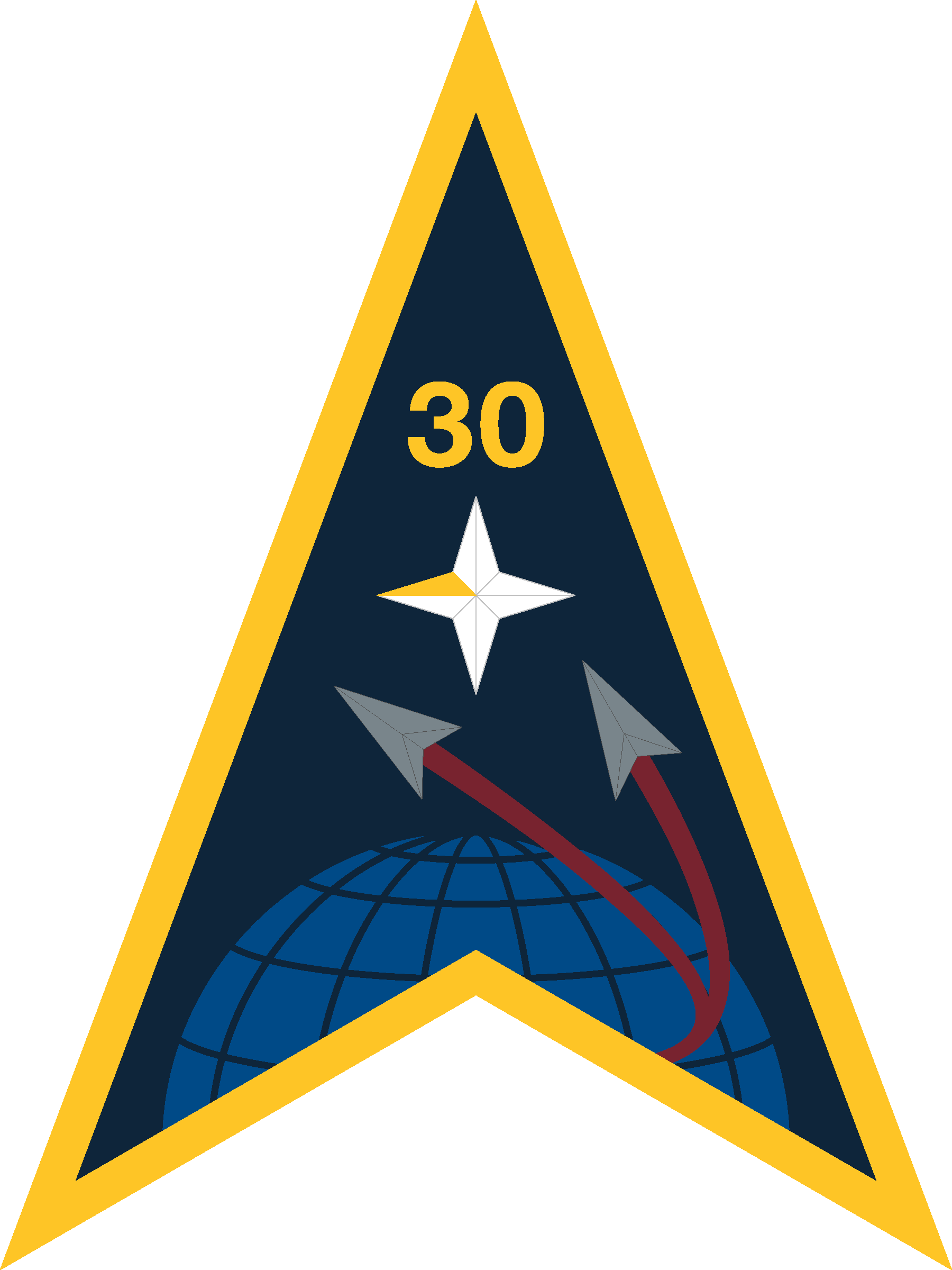
- Emblem of Space Launch Delta 30
- Founded: 19 November 1991; 34 years, 6 months 15 May 1964 (as Air Force Western Test Range)
- Country: United States
- Branch: United States Space Force
- Type: Space wing
- Role: Space launch
- Part of: Space Systems Command
- Headquarters: Vandenberg Space Force Base, California, U.S.
- Mascot: Hawks
- Decorations: Air Force Outstanding Unit Award Air Force Organization Excellence Award
- Website: www.vandenberg.spaceforce.mil

Commanders
- Commander: Col James T. Horne III
- Vice Commander for Operations: Col Dorian C. Hatcher
- Vice Commander for Support: Col Michael Hunsberger
- Senior Enlisted Leader: CMSgt Heath L. Jennings

Insignia
- Guidon

Space Launch Delta 30 (SLD 30) is a United States Space Force space launch delta, equivalent to an Air Force air base wing, assigned to Space Systems Command and headquartered at Vandenberg Space Force Base, California. Space Launch Delta 30 is responsible for all space launch operations from the west coast, which includes all polar launches. It manages the Western Range and launch activities for the Space Force, Department of Defense, NASA, and other private space corporations. Space Launch Delta 30 also supports test and evaluation launches of the U.S. Air Force's intercontinental ballistic missile force.

== Operations ==
Space Launch Delta 30 is one of two space launch wings for the U.S. Space Force, being responsible for executing military, intelligence, civil, and commercial space launches using the Western Range. Primary launch vehicles include the Atlas V, Delta IV, Pegasus, Minotaur, and Falcon rockets. It also supports Air Force Global Strike Command ballistic missile tests and evaluation and Missile Defense Agency test and operations.

Space Launch Delta 30 serves as the host wing for Vandenberg Space Force Base, providing base support for the Space Force's Space Operations Command and its Space Delta 5, and the Space Delta 6's 21st Space Operations Squadron. Space Launch Delta 30 also provides support to non-Space Force units, such as the Air Force's 532d Training Squadron and 576th Flight Test Squadron, Space Command's Combined Force Space Component Command and Combined Space Operations Center, and elements of the Missile Defense Agency, National Reconnaissance Office, and NASA.

== Structure ==
30th Operations Group (30 OG)

- 2nd Range Operations Squadron (2 ROPS)
- 2nd Space Launch Squadron (2 SLS)
- 30th Operations Support Squadron (30 OSS)
- 30th Space Communications Squadron (30 SCS)

30th Mission Support Group (30 MSG)

- 30th Civil Engineer Squadron (30 CES)
- 30th Contracting Squadron (30 CONS)
- 30th Force Support Squadron (30 FSS)
- 30th Logistics Readiness Squadron (30 LRS)
- 30th Security Forces Squadron (30 SFS)

30th Medical Group (30 MDG)

- 30th Healthcare Operations Squadron (30 HCOS)
- 30th Operational Medical Readiness Squadron (30 OMRS)

30th Comptroller Squadron (30 CPTS)

630th Cyberspace Squadron (630 CYS)

== Shield ==
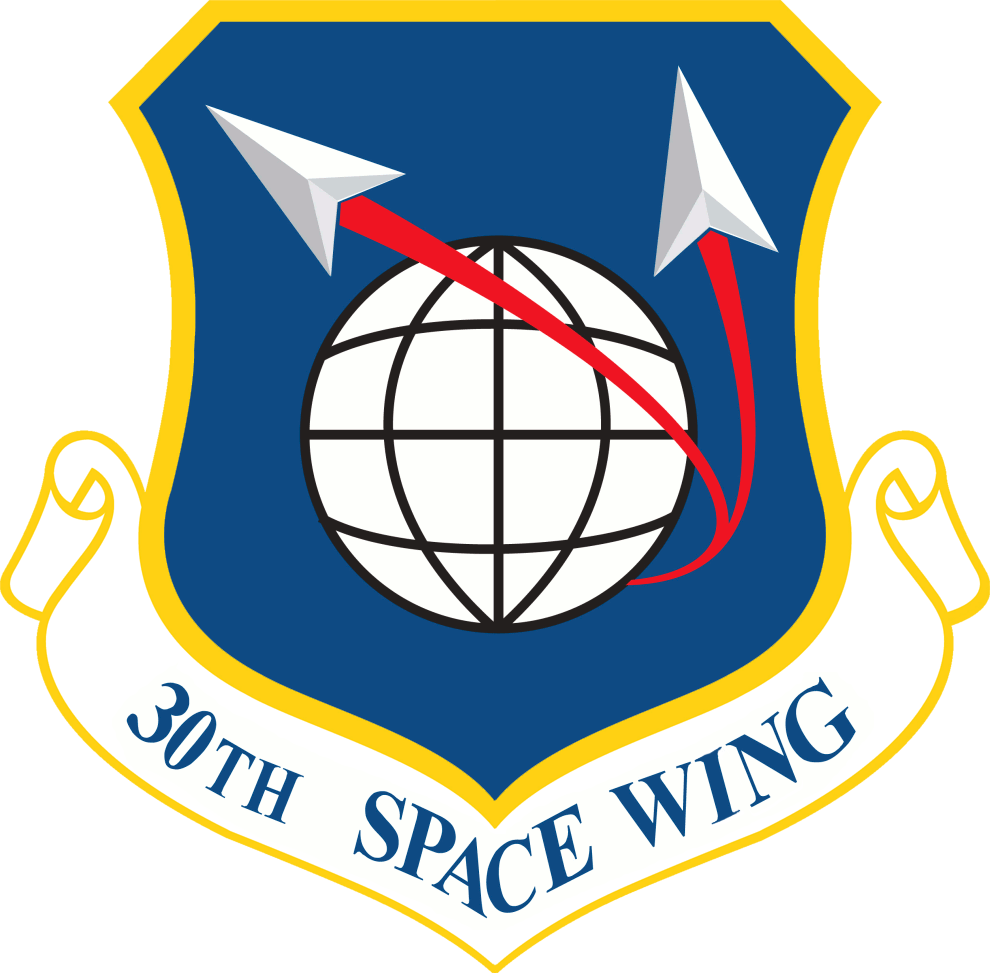
30th Space Wing shield

The 30th Space Wing shield was approved for use on 13 March 1995. The blue and yellow in the shield are the Air Force's colors, which the wing was a part of when the shield was created. The blue alludes to the sky, while the Yellow refers to the sun and the excellence required of its personnel. The two launch vehicles emanating from behind the globe represent the 30th Space Wing's intercontinental ballistic missile test and space launch missions. The remaining red, white, and blue elements represent the national colors of the United States.

== History ==
=== Air Force Western Test Range (1964–1970) ===
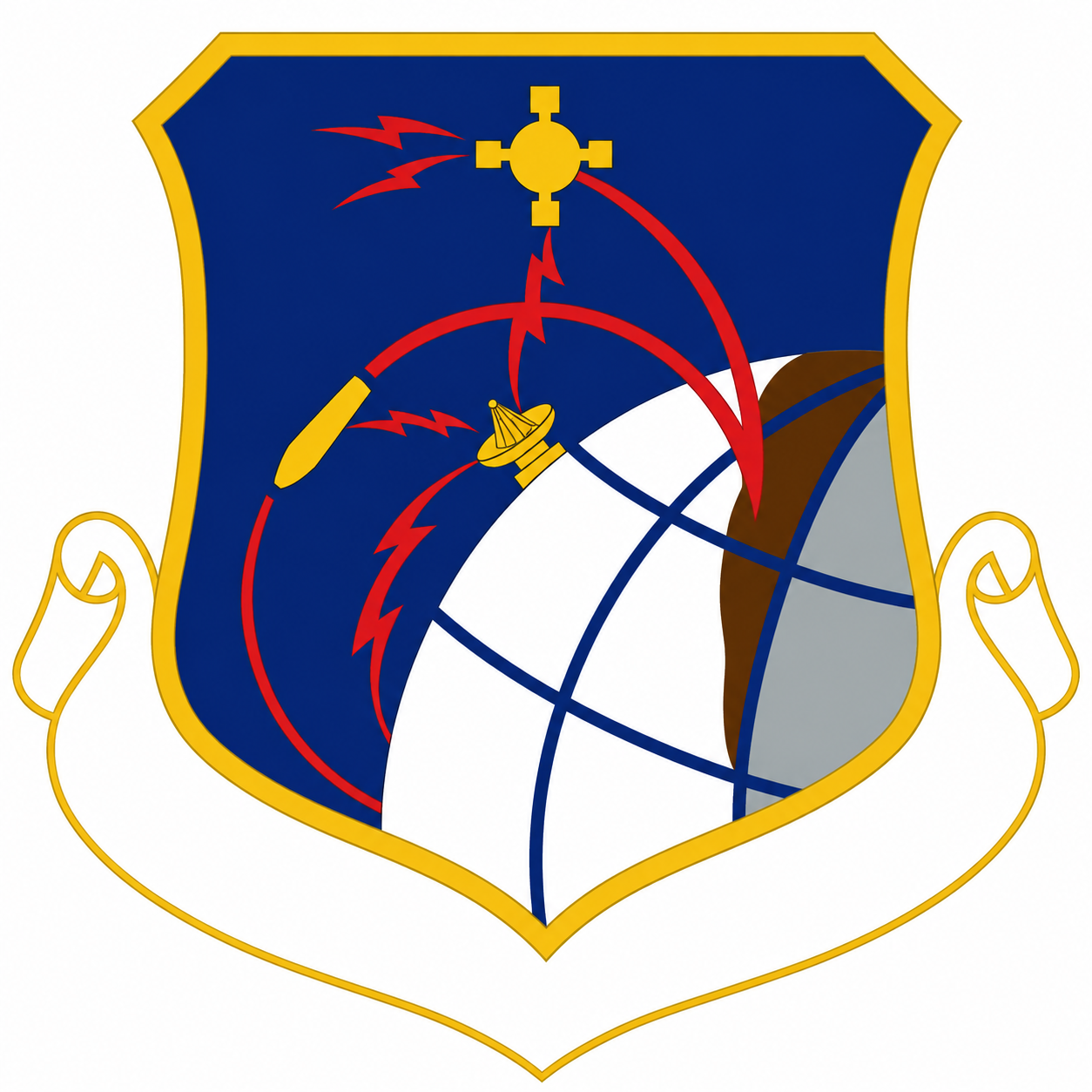
Air Force Western Test Range shield

The Air Force Western Test Range (AFWTR) was established on 15 May 1964. Initially organized as part of Air Force Systems Command's National Range Division, the Air Force Western Test Range managed all space and missile launches from the West Coast of the United States, which primarily were launched from Vandenberg Air Force Base. The AFWTR established a network of instrumentation sites along the California coast and in the Pacific islands to monitor ballistic missile and space launches in its region, although actual launches were conducted by the Space Systems Division's 6595th Aerospace Test Wing.

On 1 April 1970 the Air Force Western Test Range was inactivated, as the responsibility for managing the range was passed to the Space and Missile Systems Organization's Space and Missile Test Center.

=== Western Space and Missile Center (1979–1991) ===
In 1979 the Space and Missile Test Center was reorganized, becoming the Space and Missile Test Organization and the Air Force Western Test Range was reestablished on 1 October 1970 as the Western Space and Missile Center (WSMC), replacing the 6595th Aerospace Test Wing. Organized under the new center were the 6595th Aerospace Test Group, 6595th Test and Evaluation Group, and the 6595th Shuttle Test Group.

Initially designated as the 6595th Satellite Test Group, the 6595th Aerospace Test Group managed space launches from Vandenberg Air Force Base. The 6595th Test and Evaluation Group was initially designated as the 6595th Missile Test Group, performing missile tests for the LGM-118 Peacekeeper and LGM-30 Minuteman intercontinental ballistic missiles. Initially planned to serve as an alternate launch and landing location for the Space Shuttle, the 6595th Shuttle Group was intended to prepare facilities for its operations, before shuttle operations from Vandenberg AFB were canceled in 1987.

On 1 October 1979 the Space and Missile Test Organization was inactivated and the Western Space and Missile Center was directly subordinated to the Space Systems Division. A year later Air Force Systems Command began to transition the space launch mission to Air Force Space Command. On 1 October 1990 the Western Space and Missile Systems Center transferred to Air Force Space Command's 9th Space Division. Vandenberg Air Force Base had been a Strategic Air Command installation until 15 January 1991, when it became an Air Force Space Command base, with the Western Space and Missile Systems Center as the host organization. After the 9th Space Division was inactivated on 1 October 1991, the Western Space and Missile Systems Center directly reported to Air Force Space Command.

=== 30th Space Wing (1991–2021) ===
On 19 November 1991, as part of a larger Air Force heritage initiative, the Western Space and Missile Center was redesignated as the 30th Space Wing (30 SW), with the 30th Operations Group assuming the lineage of the World War II-era 30th Bombardment Group (Heavy). The Western Test Range was also renamed as the Western Range, to emphasize its operational nature. On 1 July 1993 the 30th Space Wing was assigned to the newly-reactivated Fourteenth Air Force.

On 1 December 2003 the 30th Launch Group was activated to manage launch operations. On 20 July 2018 the 30th Launch Group was reemerged with the 30th Operations Group in an effort to streamline Air Force Space Command organizations.

On 20 December 2019 the 30th Space Wing, along with the rest of Air Force Space Command became part of the United States Space Force. The Fourteenth Air Force was redesignated as Space Operations Command, which the 30th Space Wing remained assigned to.

=== Space Launch Delta 30 (2021–present) ===
Upon the activation of Space Systems Command, the 30th Space Wing was transferred over from Space Operations Command and was renamed as Space Launch Delta 30.

== List of commanders ==
No.	Commander		Term		
No.	Portrait	Name	Took office	Left office	Duration
30th Space Wing
1	Sebastian F. Coglitore	Brigadier General; Sebastian F. Coglitore	10 September 1991	13 August 1993	1 year, 337 days
2	Lance W. Lord	Brigadier General; Lance W. Lord	13 August 1993	7 August 1995	3 years, 331 days
3	Franklin J. Blaisdell	Colonel; Franklin J. Blaisdell	7 August 1995	5 June 1996	303 days
4	C. Robert Kehler	Colonel; C. Robert Kehler	5 June 1996	15 June 1998	2 years, 10 days
5	Roosevelt Mercer Jr.	Colonel; Roosevelt Mercer Jr.	15 June 1998	11 June 1999	361 days
6	Stephen L. Lanning	Colonel; Stephen L. Lanning	11 June 1999	30 May 2001	1 year, 353 days
7	Robert M. Worley II	Colonel; Robert M. Worley II	30 May 2001	16 June 2003	2 years, 17 days
8	Frank Gallegos	Colonel; Frank Gallegos	16 June 2003	30 June 2005	2 years, 14 days
9	Jack Weinstein	Colonel; Jack Weinstein	30 June 2005	5 March 2007	1 year, 248 days
10	Stephen M. Tanous	Colonel; Stephen M. Tanous	5 March 2007	27 June 2008	1 year, 114 days
11	David J. Buck	Colonel; David J. Buck	27 June 2008	26 April 2010	1 year, 303 days
12	Richard W. Boltz	Colonel; Richard W. Boltz	26 April 2010	23 January 2012	1 year, 272 days
13	Nina M. Armagno	Colonel; Nina M. Armagno	23 January 2012	28 May 2013	1 year, 125 days
14	Keith Balts	Colonel; Keith Balts	28 May 2013	9 July 2015	4 years, 42 days
15	J. Christopher Moss	Colonel; J. Christopher Moss	9 July 2015	9 June 2017	1 year, 335 days
16	Michael S. Hough	Colonel; Michael S. Hough	9 June 2017	12 July 2019	2 years, 33 days
17	Anthony J. Mastalir	Colonel; Anthony J. Mastalir	12 July 2019	14 May 2021	1 year, 306 days
Space Launch Delta 30
17	Anthony J. Mastalir	Colonel; Anthony J. Mastalir	14 May 2021	11 June 2021	28 days
18	Robert A. Long	Colonel; Robert A. Long	11 June 2021	13 July 2023	2 years, 32 days
19	Mark A. Shoemaker	Colonel; Mark A. Shoemaker	13 July 2023	8 July 2025	1 year, 360 days
20	James T. Horne III	Colonel; James T. Horne III	8 July 2025	Incumbent	331 days
