= Roy Wilkins Renown Service Award =

Civil rights award

Roy Wilkins was a highly respected senior official of the National Association for the Advancement of Colored People, and in 1980 the Association created the Roy Wilkins Renown Service Award for members of United States Armed Forces who had advanced civil rights.

== List of notable recipients ==
Notable recipients of the Roy Wilkins Renown Service Award have included:
image	year	service	name	rank	notes
	1992	USMC	Sam Spain	Master Gunnery Sergeant	His son Terry received the award in 2014.
	1994	USCG	John G. Witherspoon	Captain	Second African American to command a USCG cutter.
	2007	USN	Jimmy Ryals	Lieutenant Commander	
	2009	USN	Robert A. Sanders	Captain	
	2011	USMC	Larry McCutcheon	Gunnery Sergeant	
	2013	civilian	Michael C. Crosby	civilian	Worked for the Defense Contract Management Agency.
	2013	USCG	John W. Pruitt, III	Lieutenant Commander	
	2014	USN	Terry Spain	Chief Mass Communication Specialist	His father Sam received the award in 1992.
	2014	USMC	Andrew Smith IV	Officer Selection Officer	Marine Corps Major
	2014	USAF	Kevin Brown		
	2019	USAF	Tenaugrie Malone	1st Lieutenant	
		USN	Richard G. Stewart Jr.	Captain	A JAG officer.
