= ASC-15 =

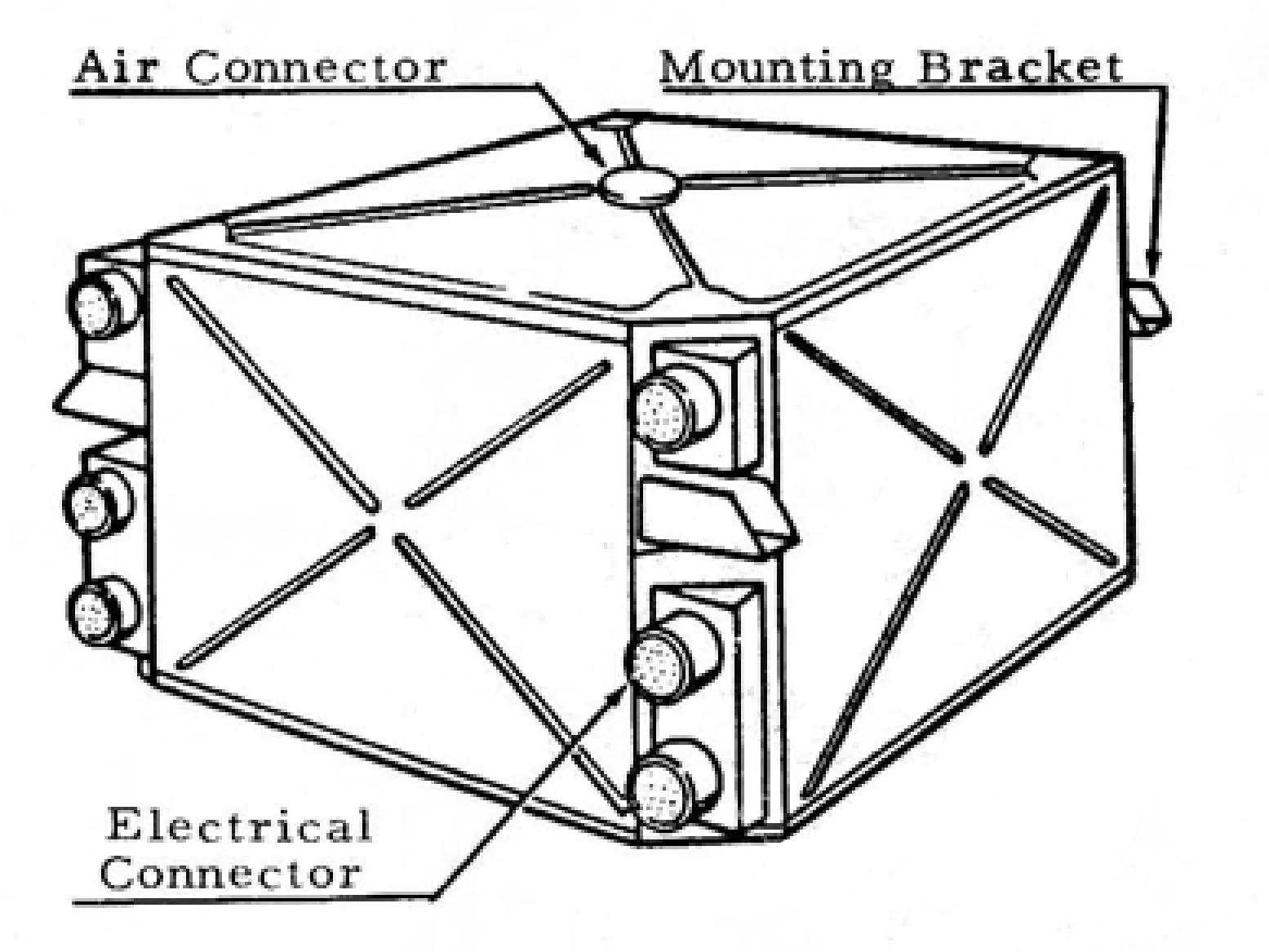
ASC-15 digital computer.

The ASC-15 (Advance System Controller Model 15) was a digital computer developed by International Business Machines (IBM) for use on the Titan II intercontinental ballistic missile (ICBM). It was subsequently modified and used on the Titan III and Saturn I Block II launch vehicles.

Its principal function on these rockets was to make navigation calculations using data from inertial sensor systems. It also performed readiness checks before launch. It was a digital serial processor using fixed-point data with 27-bit words. The storage was a drum memory. Electronic circuits were soldered encapsulated modules, consisting of discrete resistors, transistors, capacitors, and other components soldered together and encapsulated in a foam material. It was manufactured in the IBM plant at Owego, NY.

== ASC-15 for Titan II ==
The first inertial guidance system for the Titan II was built by AC Spark Plug, and included an inertial measurement unit based on designs from Draper Labs at MIT, and the ASC-15 computer designed and built by IBM in Owego, NY. The first Titan II missile carrying this system was launched 16 March 1962. Acquiring spares for this system became difficult, and the Air Force decided to replace it with a new system. The AC Spark Plug system, including the ASC-15, was replaced by the Delco Electronics Universal Space Guidance System (USGS) on operational Titan II missiles starting in January 1978. The guidance computer in the USGS was the Magic 352, made by Delco.

The ASC-15 was built on an aluminum frame about 1.5 ft × 1.5 ft × 1 ft (46 cm × 46 cm × 30 cm). The sides, top and bottom were covered by pieces of laminated plastic, covered with gold-plated aluminum foil. These covers were slightly convex and ribbed for stiffness. Inside the covers were fifty-two logic sticks, each containing four welded encapsulated modules. These surrounded a bell frame housing a drum memory.

The drum was a thin-walled stainless steel cylinder 3 in (76 mm) long and 4.5 in (110 mm) in diameter covered with a magnetic nickel-cobalt alloy. It was driven by a synchronous motor at 6,000 rpm. The drum had 70 tracks, of which 58 were used and 12 were spare. These tracks were used as follows:

NO. TRACKS	USE OF TRACKS
34	Instruction tracks
7	Constants
8	Target data
2	Data for temporary storage
5	Revolvers for extra fast access storage
2	Timing tracks

The capacity of a track was 1,728 bits. Instruction words were 9-bits long, and data was stored in 27-bit words.

Coincident with 58 tracks were 67 read heads and 13 write heads. While the drum was spinning at 6,000 rpm, the heads floated above the surface of the drum on a thin layer of air. When the drum was spinning up or slowing down, the heads were raised off the drum by camshafts rotated by a chain that was driven by a motor on top of the drum housing, to avoid scoring the magnetic surface.

== ASC-15 for Titan III ==
The Titan III was a space launch vehicle based on the Titan II ICBM. The ASC-15 was kept as the vehicle guidance computer, but the drum was lengthened slightly to provide 78 usable tracks, an increase of 20 over the drum used in the Titan II. The memory held 9,792 instructions (51 tracks) and 1,152 constants (18 tracks). The speed was the same as for the Titan II: 100 revolutions/second × 64 words/revolution × 27 bits/word = 172.8 kilobits/second. The time for an addition operation was 156 μs; for a multiplication, 1,875 μs; and for a division, 7,968 μs.

== ASC-15 for Saturn I ==
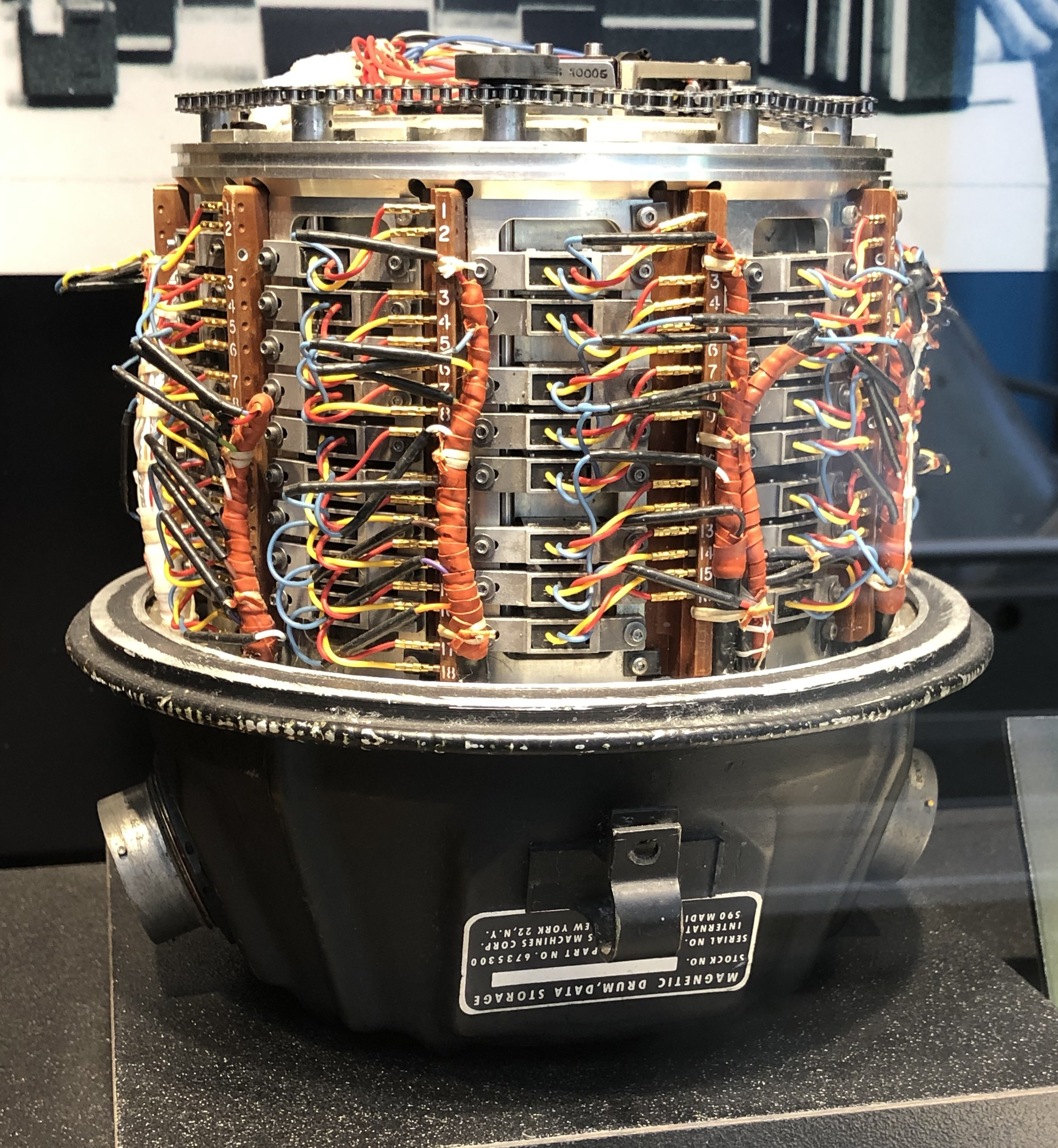
Saturn I Drum memory ASC-15 guidance computer

No guidance computer was used for Saturn I Block I (missions SA-1, 2, 3 and 4). The pitch program was provided by a cam device located in the Servo Loop Amplifier Box. The sequence of events was controlled by a program device that was also used on Jupiter missiles. This was a 6-track tape recorder that sent pulses to a set of relays (the flight sequencer) to activate and deactivate various circuits in a precisely timed sequence.

The ASC-15 was first flown on SA-5, the first Saturn I Block II vehicle and the first to achieve orbit. It was a passenger on this mission, not guiding the vehicle but generating test data for later evaluation. The active guidance system on SA-5 was similar to that of earlier flights. The passenger system was the ASC-15 and the ST-124 inertial platform. Guidance was open loop; that is guidance commands were functions only of time. SA-5 also saw the introduction of the Instrument Unit.

On SA-6, while open loop ST-90S guidance was used for the first stage (S-I), after separation the ST-124 and ASC-15 used path adaptive guidance (closed loop) to control the second stage (S-IV). The effectiveness of the path adaptive guidance was demonstrated inadvertently when premature shutdown of S-I engine number eight had virtually no effect on the vehicle trajectory.

On SA-7 the ST-124 system guided the firing of both stages. The digital computer is the ASC-15. It replaced both the cam device that contained the S-I tilt program for earlier missions and the program device that controlled the sequence of events on those missions.

The next mission flown after SA-7 was SA-9. It carried a new version of the Instrument Unit, one that was unpressurized and 2 feet (0.61 m) shorter than version 1. Version 2 flew on the remaining Saturn I missions (SA-8, 9, and 10).

== Gallery ==
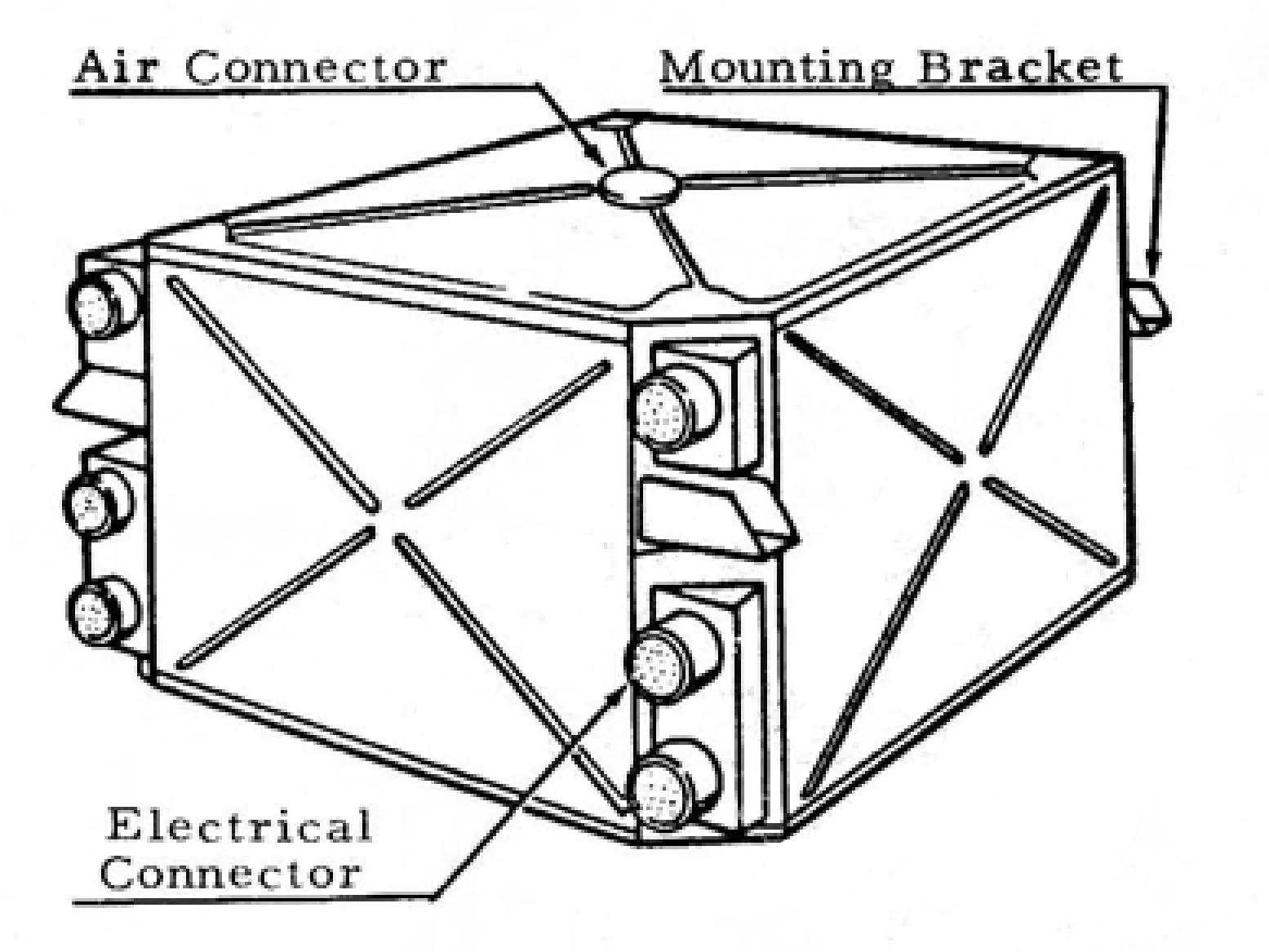
Missile Guidance Computer (MGC) for Titan II.

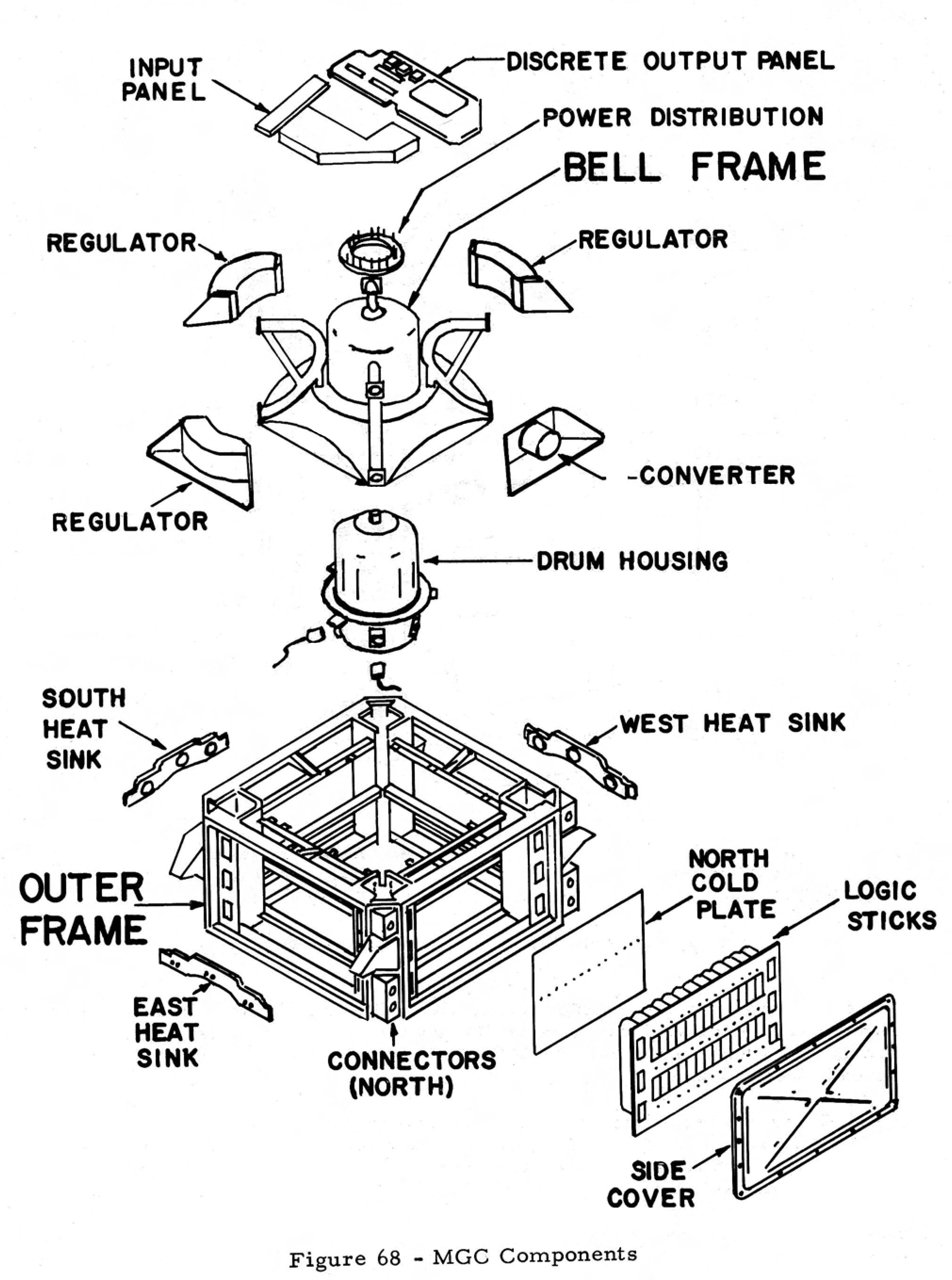
Exploded view of MGC.

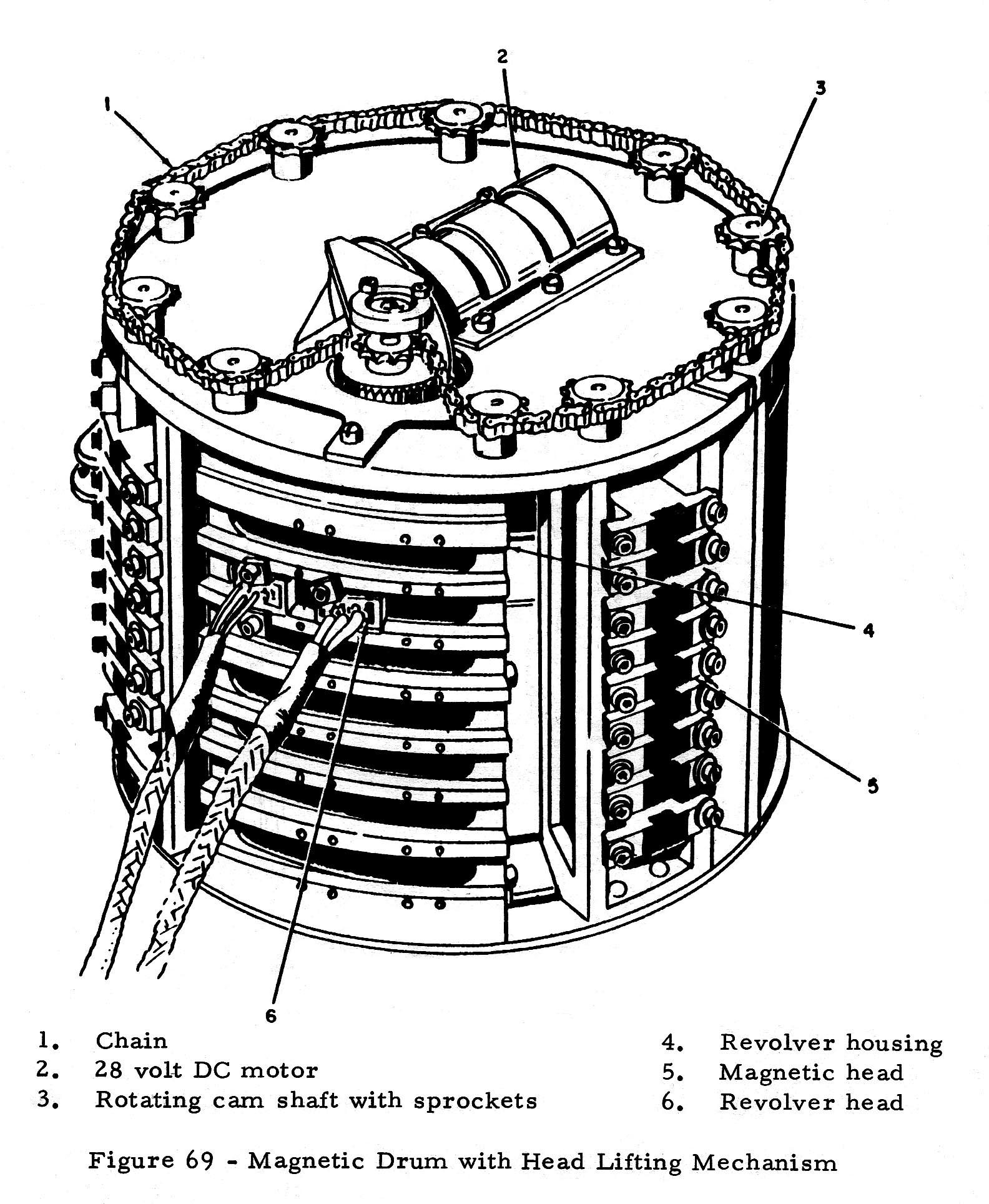
Drum memory of the ASC-15

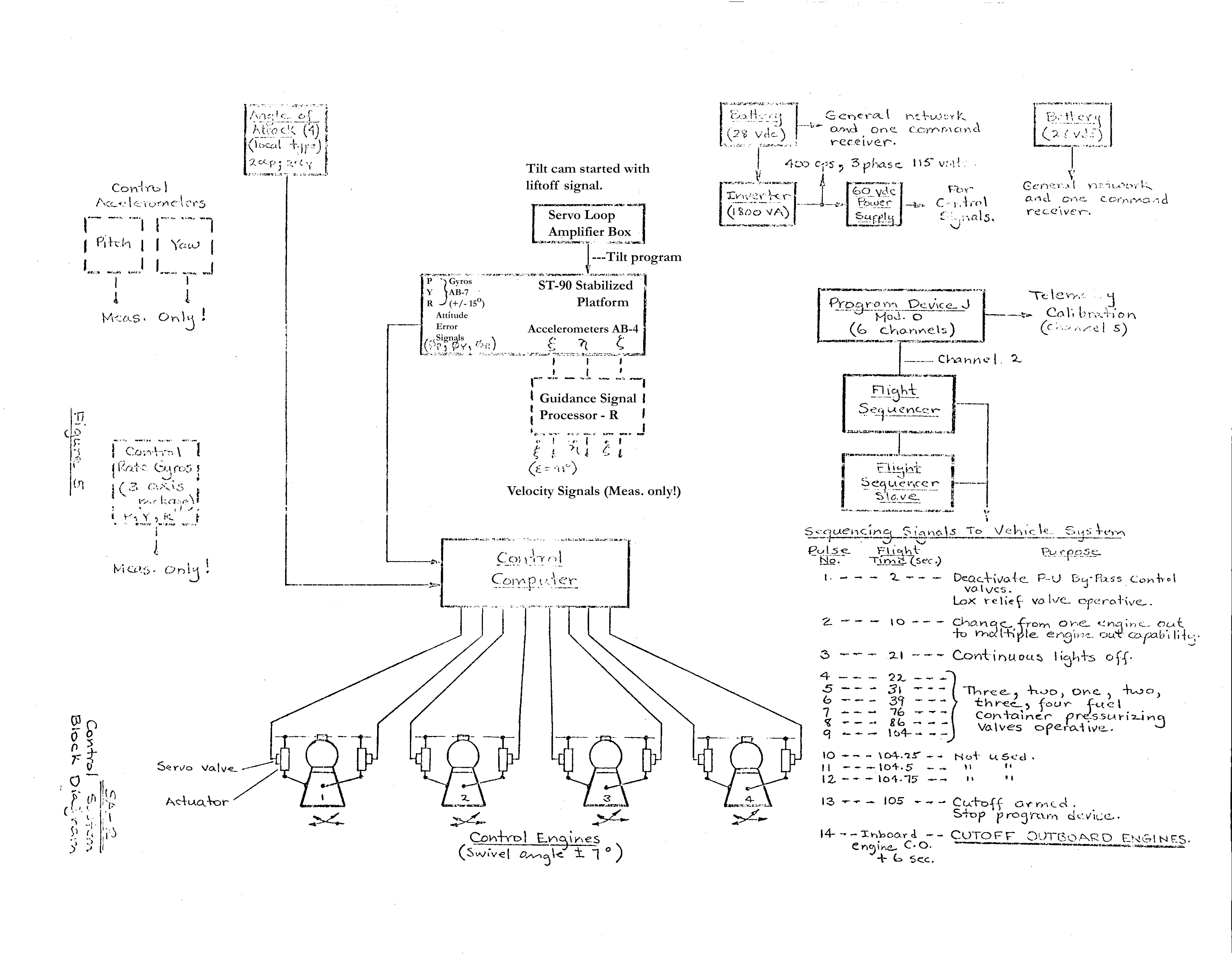
SA-2 control system

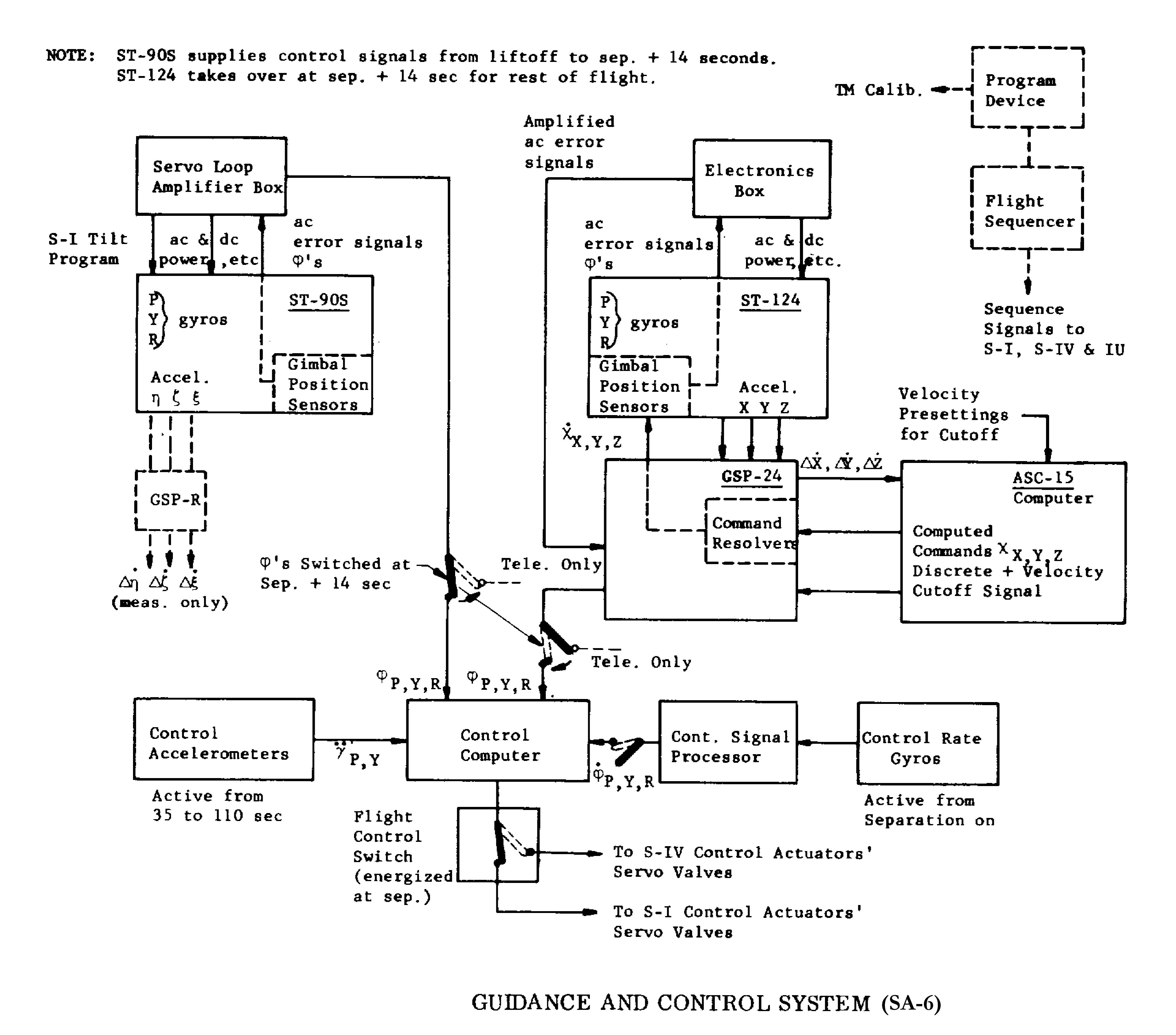
SA-6 guidance and control system

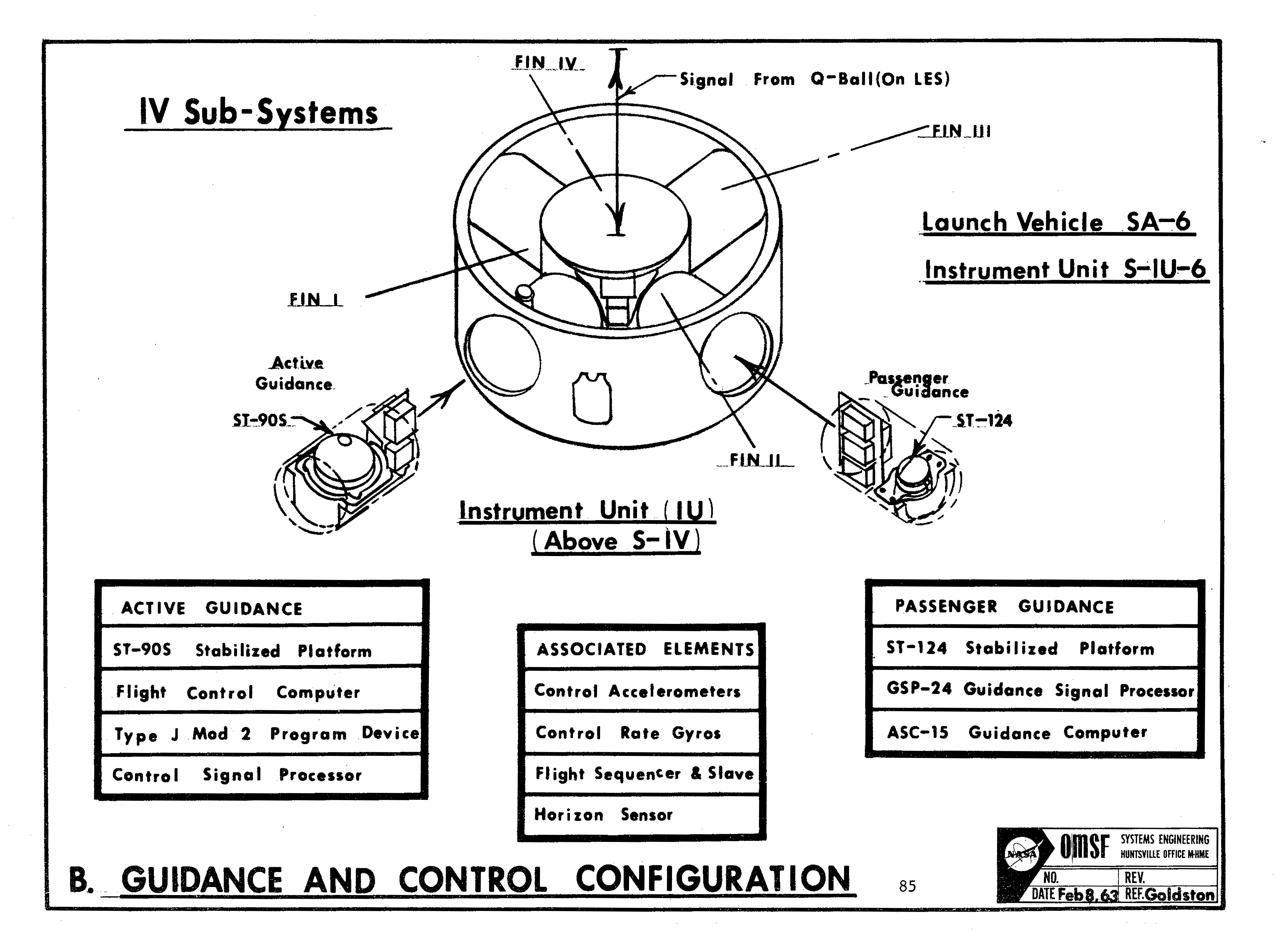
Instrument Unit for SA-6

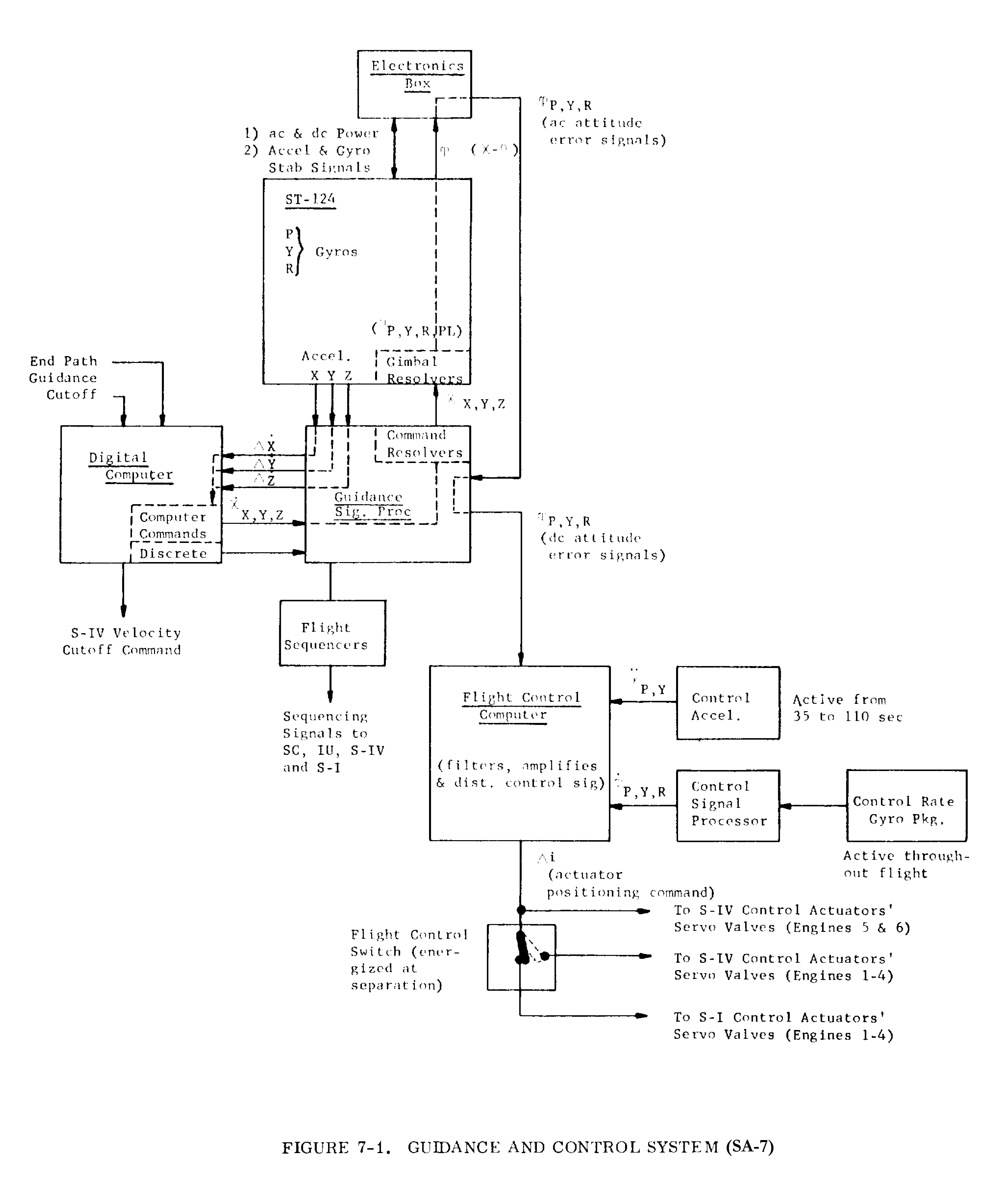
SA-7 guidance and control system

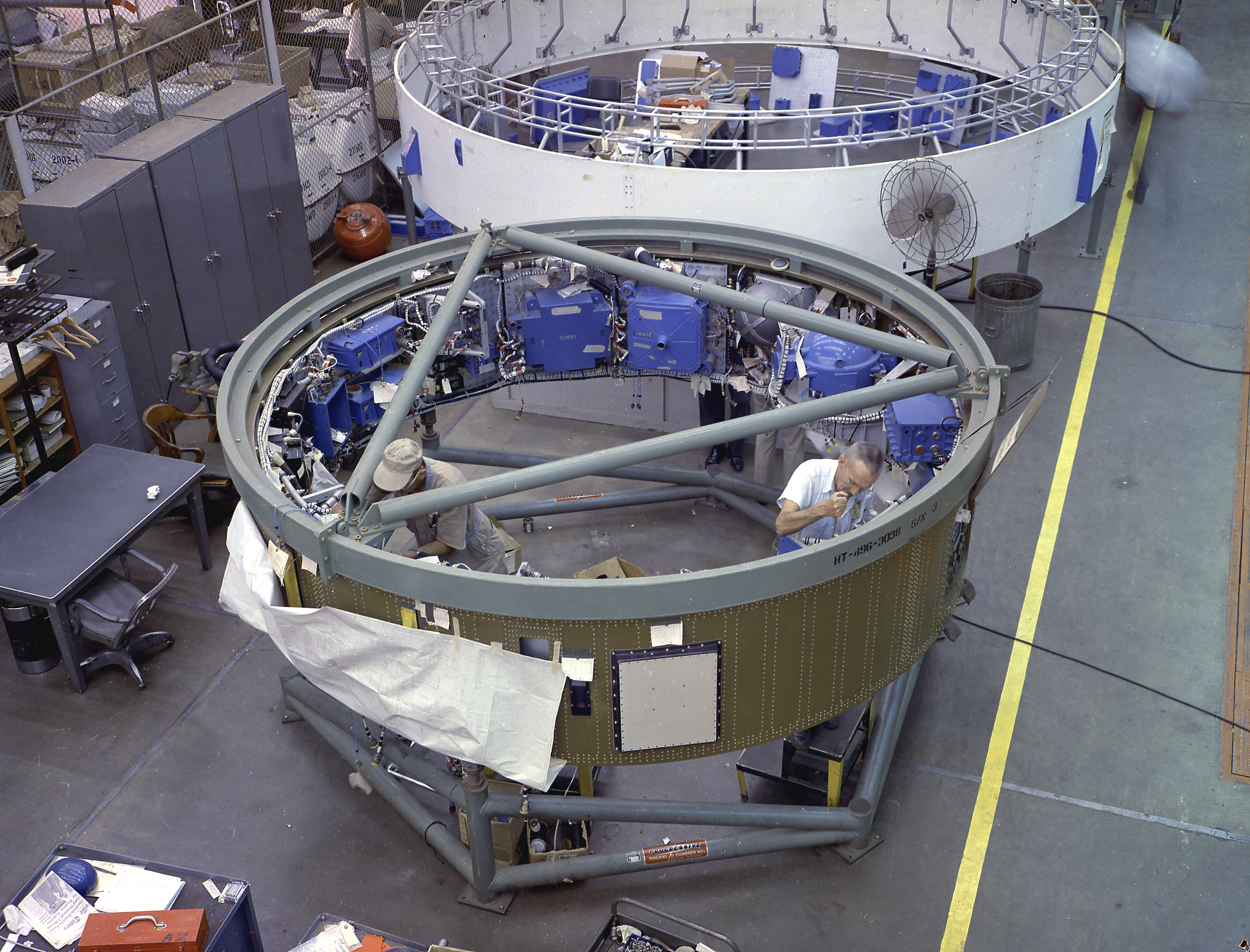
SA-8 instrument unit under construction at Marshall Space Flight Center (MSFC)

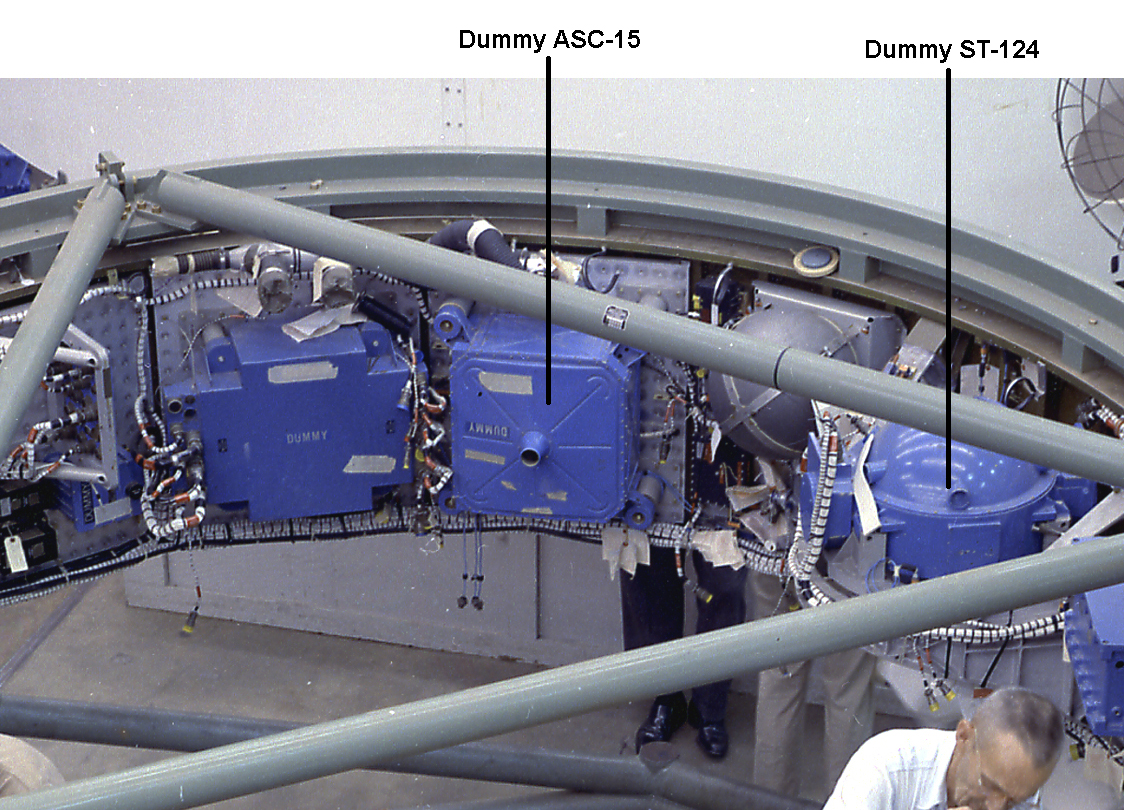
Detail of SA-8 instrument unit, with dummies marked for ASC-15 and ST-124.
