= 532d Training Squadron =

532d Training Squadron

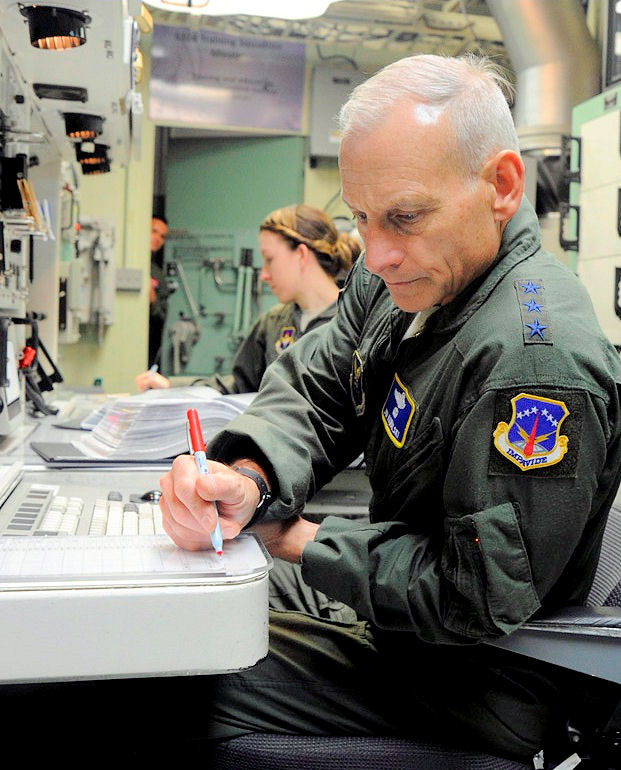
- Lt Gen James Kowalski, Air Force Global Strike Command commander, runs a procedural checklist during a launch simulation at the 532d Training Squadron simulator
- Active: 1942-1945; 1947–1949; 1962-1986; 1994-present
- Country: United States
- Branch: United States Air Force
- Type: Squadron
- Role: Intercontinental ballistic missile training
- Part of: Air Education and Training Command
- Garrison/HQ: Vandenberg Space Force Base, CA
- Engagements: World War II (EAME Theater)
- Decorations: Distinguished Unit Citation; Air Force Outstanding Unit Award

Commanders
- Current commander: Lt Col Luke Oman

Insignia
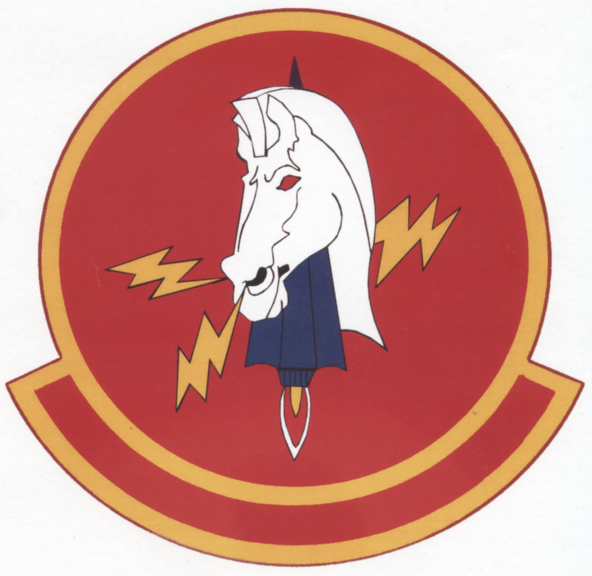
- 532d Training Squadron emblem (Note: Approved 23 April 1963. Description: On a red disc edged Air Force golden yellow, an Air Force blue stylized missile in palewise upward flight emitting Air Force golden yellow, red, and white exhaust to base, all surmounted by a white Trojan horse's head in profile, his eye red, outlines and details black; originating in sinister an Air Force golden yellow lightning bolt disappearing behind the horse's head and issuing from the horse’s nostrils to dexter and dexter base. Significance: Against a scarlet background (to represent valor), the head of a white Trojan horse, his eye flashing red, his nostrils emitting lightning bolts, represents the strength and might of this unit. The stylized missile indicates this unit's space age weapons system.)

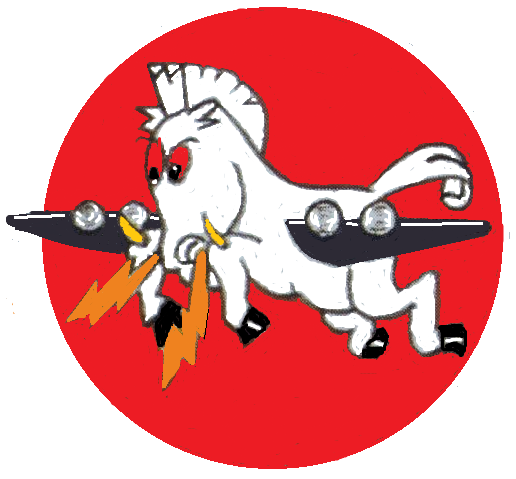
- 532d Bombardment Squadron emblem (Note: Approved 4 October 1943. Description: On a scarlet disc, a white flying Trojan horse, outlined in black, winged with Fortress wings ultramarine blue, edged white, having a golden lance spike on the knees of each foreleg. eyes red, and breathing jagged golden orange lightning flash from each nostril.)
- World War II fuselage code: VE

The 532d Training Squadron is a United States Air Force unit, assigned to the 82nd Training Group at Vandenberg Space Force Base, California. The squadron was first activated in 1942 as the 532d Bombardment Squadron. After training in the United States, it moved to England and engaged in strategic bombing campaign against Germany with Boeing B-17 Flying Fortress bombers. In the European Theater of Operations, it earned two Distinguished Unit Citations. It returned to the United States after the war and was inactivated. The squadron was activated briefly in the reserves from 1947-1949, but was not fully manned or equipped.

From 1963 to 1986, the squadron stood alert with LGM-25C Titan II intercontinental ballistic missiles as the 532d Strategic Missile Squadron. It assumed its current training mission in 1994.

== Mission ==
The mission of the unit is to conduct training for the nation's intercontinental ballistic missile (ICBM) operations and ICBM and air launched cruise missile (ALCM) maintenance forces. It trains electronic, electro- and missile-mechanical, facility, and spacelift maintenance technicians.

== History ==
=== World War II ===
==== Training in the United States ====
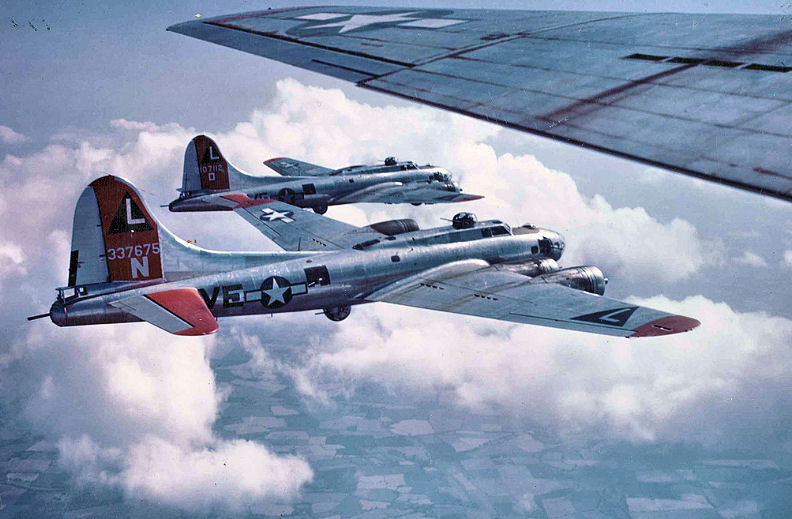
B-17s of the 532d Bombardment Squadron (Note: Aircraft in the foreground is Boeing B-17G-70-BO Flying Fortress, serial 43-37675, VE-N, Patches/Flak Magnet (after October 1944, Trudie's Terror). It survived the war and was transferred to Kingman, Arizona on 17 December 1945. It was sold for scrap in July 1946. Baugher, Joe (10 April 2023). "1943 USAF Serial Numbers". Joe Baugher.)

The squadron was first activated on 3 November 1942 at Gowen Field, Idaho as the 532d Bombardment Squadron, one of the four original squadrons of the 381st Bombardment Group. It gathered its initial cadre at Gowen, but only began training for combat with the Boeing B-17 Flying Fortress after moving to Pyote Army Air Field, Texas at the end of the year. On 8 May 1943, the ground echelon began moving to the port of embarkation at Camp Kilmer, New Jersey, and boarded the RMS Queen Elizabeth for the European Theater of Operations on 27 May. The air echelon marshalled at Salinas Army Air Field, Kansas and began movement by the North Atlantic Ferry Route on 15 May.

==== Combat in the European Theater ====
The air echelon of the squadron arrived at RAF Bovingdon in late May 1943. The following month, the squadron was reunited at RAF Ridgewell, which was to be its combat station for the rest of the war. The squadron entered the strategic bombing campaign against Germany, when it flew its first mission on 21 June, a diversionary attack against Antwerp. Its targets in France included an aircraft assembly plant near Villacoublay, and an engine plant at Le Mans, locks at Saint-Nazaire, and Amiens – Glisy Aerodrome. It also attacked an aircraft plant in Brussels, Belgium. During Blitz Week, it bombed nitrate factories in Heroya, Norway, stopping production for over three months.

The squadron also flew deeper penetration missions into Germany. It hit oil refineries at Gelsenkirchen, submarine pens at Kiel, aircraft plants at Kassel and Leipzig, industrial targets in Münster, marshalling yards at Offenberg, and the ball bearing plants at Schweinfurt. On 8 October 1943, despite heavy enemy interceptor opposition, it accurately struck shipyards at Bremen, for which it was awarded the Distinguished Unit Citation (DUC). All squadron bombers that returned from this mission (Note: Eight of the 17 bombers dispatched by the 381st Group were shot down on this mission. Freeman, p. 75.) received battle damage. It received a second DUC for attacks on aircraft plants in Germany on 11 January 1944. In late February 1944, the unit participated in Big Week, the intensive attacks on the German aircraft industry.

The squadron was occasionally taken off strategic operations to perform air support and interdiction missions. It bombed bridges and airfields near the beachhead to support Operation Overlord, the invasion of Normandy, in June 1944. The following month, it attacked positions of enemy forces opposing Operation Cobra, the breakout at Saint Lo. It supported Operation Market Garden, the airborne attacks in the Netherlands near Arnhem, in the fall. From December 1944, through January 1945, it attacked lines of communications and airfields near the battle zone during the Battle of the Bulge. It also supported the Allied crossing of the Rhine and push through central Germany in March 1945.

==== Return to the United States and inactivation ====
The squadron flew its last mission on 26 April 1945 and the majority of the unit's aircraft departed the theater on 24 May 1945. Ground personnel sailed on the RMS Queen Elizabeth on 24 June, arriving in the US by the end of the month. The squadron was located at Sioux Falls Army Air Field, South Dakota a few days later and was inactivated on 24 August 1945.

=== Air Force reserve ===
The squadron was activated in the reserve at Offutt Field, Nebraska, where its training was supervised by the 4131st AAF Base Unit (later the 2473d Air Force Reserve Training Center) of Air Defense Command (ADC). It was originally assigned directly to Second Air Force, but the following year again became part of the 381st Group. Although designated a very heavy bombardment group, it does not appear to have been fully manned and was equipped with North American AT-6 Texan and Beechcraft AT-11 training aircraft. In 1948 Continental Air Command assumed responsibility for managing reserve and Air National Guard units from ADC. President Truman's reduced 1949 defense budget also required reductions in the number of units in the Air Force, and the 532d was inactivated In June 1949.

=== Strategic missile operation ===
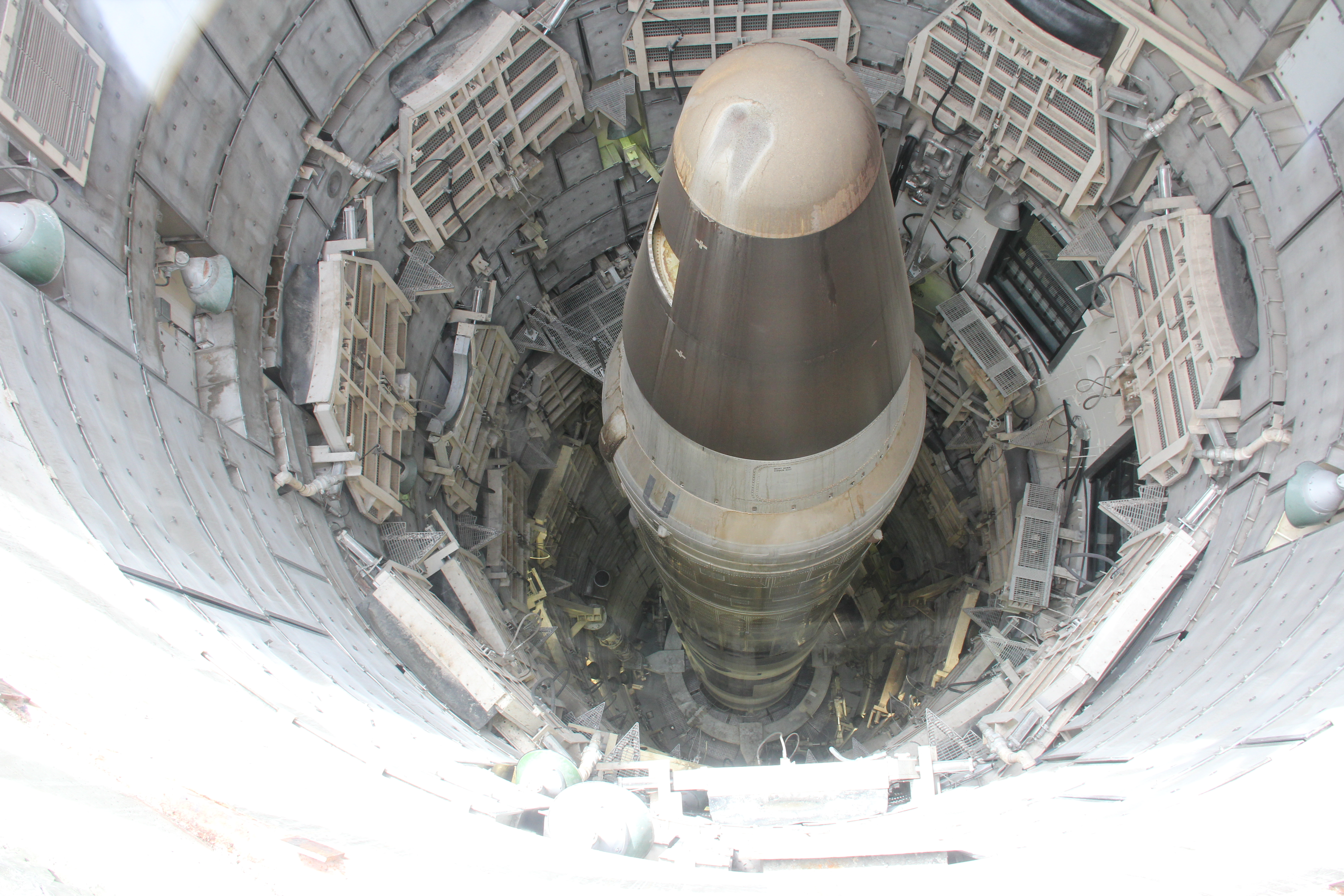
Titan II missile in its silo

The unit was redesignated the 532d Strategic Missile Squadron and organized at McConnell Air Force Base, Kansas on 1 March 1962 as a part of the 381st Strategic Missile Wing. The squadron began training in preparation for LGM-25C Titan II, and the 381st Wing put its first Titans on alert in July 1963. It operated nine Titan II underground silos constructed beginning in 1960; the first site going operationally ready in October 1963 The nine missiles remained on alert for over 20 years during the Cold War.

In October 1981, President Ronald Reagan announced that as part of the strategic modernization program, Titan II systems were to be retired by 1 October 1987. Inactivation of the sites began in September 1984, In November 1985, the 533d Strategic Missile Squadron was inactivated and its remaining active missiles were transferred to the 532d. The squadron became nonoperational in May 1986, and the squadron was inactivated on 8 August 1986.

After removal from service, the silos had reusable equipment removed by Air Force personnel, and contractors retrieved salvageable metals before destroying the silos with explosives and filling them in. Access to the vacated control centers was blocked off. Missile sites were later sold off to private ownership after demilitarization. Today the remains of the sites are still visible in aerial imagery, in various states of use or abandonment.

=== Missile training ===
The squadron was redesignated the 532d Training Squadron and activated at Vandenberg Air Force Base, California on 1 October 1994, when Air Education and Training Command expanded its space and missile training organizations from a single squadron to a group. The 532nd serves Air Force Global Strike Command by providing initial and advanced maintenance training in LGM-30G Minuteman III, and AGM-86 ALCM air-launched cruise missile systems. Following the creation of the United States Space Force, the 381st Training Group was inactivated and the 532d Training Squadron was reorganized as a geographically separated unit under the 82d Training Group, Sheppard AFB, Texas.

== Lineage ==
- Constituted as the 532d Bombardment Squadron (Heavy) on 28 October 1942

Activated on 3 November 1942
Redesignated 532d Bombardment Squadron, Heavy on 20 August 1943
Inactivated on 28 August 1945

- Activated in the reserve on 20 December 1946

Redesignated 532d Bombardment Squadron, Very Heavy on 27 December 1946
Inactivated on 27 June 1949

- Redesignated 532d Strategic Missile Squadron (ICBM-Titan) and activated on 26 February 1962

Organized on 1 March 1962
Inactivated on 8 August 1986

- Redesignated 532d Training Squadron on 4 August 1994
- Activated on 1 October 1994

=== Assignments ===
- 381st Bombardment Group, 3 November 1942 – 28 August 1945
- Second Air Force, 20 December 1946
- 381st Bombardment Group, 30 September 1947 – 27 June 1949
- Strategic Air Command, 26 February 1962 (not organized)
- 381st Strategic Missile Wing, 1 August 1962 – 8 August 1986
- 381st Training Group, 1 October 1994 – 7 December 2020
- 82nd Training Wing, 7 December 2020 – present

=== Stations ===
- Gowen Field, Idaho, 3 November 1942
- Ephrata Army Air Base, Washington, 1 December 1942
- Pyote Army Air Field, Texas, 27 December 1942
- Pueblo Army Air Base, Colorado, 6 April–10 May 1943
- RAF Ridgewell (AAF-167), England, 2 June 1943 – 24 June 1945
- Sioux Falls Army Air Field, South Dakota, 3 July–28 August 1945
- Offutt Field (later Offutt Air Force Base), Nebraska, 27 April 1947 – 27 June 1949
- McConnell Air Force Base, Kansas, 1 August 1962 – 8 August 1986
- Vandenberg Space Force Base, California, 1 October 1994 – present

=== Aircraft and missiles ===
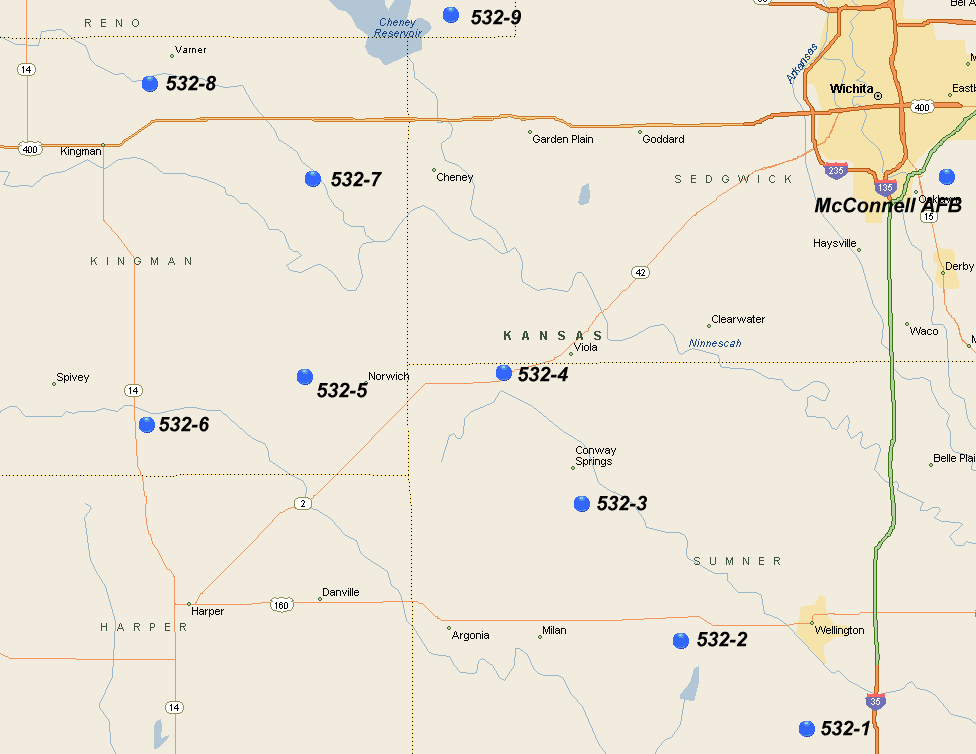
LGM-25C Titan II Sites

- Boeing B-17 Flying Fortress, 1942–1945
- North American AT-6 Texan, 1947–1949
- Beechcraft AT-11, 1947–1949
- LGM-25C Titan II, 1962–1986

Missile sites:

532-1 (21 Nov 1963 – 8 Jan 1985), 2.2 mi NN of Rome, KS 37°11′04″N 097°24′31″W
532-2 (29 Nov 1963 – 16 Nov 1985), 0.6 mi ESE of Mayfield, KS 37°15′16″N 097°32′03″W
532-3 (4 Dec 1963 – 17 Sep 1984), 1.9 mi SSE of Conway Springs, KS 37°21′48″N 097°37′59″W
532-4 (13 Nov 1963 – 20 Feb 1986), 3.9 mi WSW of Viola, KS 37°28′04″N 097°42′41″W
532-5 (10 Nov 1963 – 10 Aug 1984), 3.5 mi W of Norwich, KS 37°27′51″N 097°54′40″W
532-6 (31 Oct 1963 – 16 Jan 1986), 8.8 mi WSW of Belmont, KS 37°25′31″N 098°04′08″W
532-7 (14 Nov 1963 – 29 Oct 1984), 1.6 mi ENE of Murdock, KS 37°37′17″N 097°54′13″W
532-8 (23 Oct 1963 – 29 Jan 1986), 2.3 mi SW of Varner, KS 37°41′47″N 098°04′03″W
532-9 (15 Oct 1963 – 25 Mar 1986), 1.9 mi W of Saint Joe, KS 37°45′08″N 097°45′55″W

=== Awards and campaigns ===
Award streamer	Award	Dates	Notes
	Distinguished Unit Citation	8 October 1943	Bremen, 532d Bombardment Squadron
	Distinguished Unit Citation	11 January 1944	Germany, 532d Bombardment Squadron
	Air Force Outstanding Unit Award	1 January 1966-30 June 1967	532d Strategic Missile Squadron
	Air Force Outstanding Unit Award	1 July 1971-30 June 1972	532d Strategic Missile Squadron
	Air Force Outstanding Unit Award	1 July 1971-30 June 1972	532d Strategic Missile Squadron
	Air Force Outstanding Unit Award	1 July 1974-30 June 1975	532d Strategic Missile Squadron
	Air Force Outstanding Unit Award	1 July 1984-30 June 1986	532d Strategic Missile Squadron
	Air Force Outstanding Unit Award	1 July 1998-30 June 2000	532d Training Squadron
	Air Force Outstanding Unit Award	1 July 2000-30 June 2001	532d Training Squadron
	Air Force Outstanding Unit Award	1 July 2002-30 June 2003	532d Training Squadron
	Air Force Outstanding Unit Award	1 July 2005-30 June 2006	532d Training Squadron
	Air Force Outstanding Unit Award	1 July 2008-30 June 2010	532d Training Squadron

Campaign Streamer	Campaign	Dates	Notes
	Air Offensive, Europe	2 June 1943 – 5 June 1944	532d Bombardment Squadron
	Air Combat, EAME Theater	2 June 1943 – 11 May 1945	532d Bombardment Squadron
	Normandy	6 June 1944 – 24 July 1944	532d Bombardment Squadron
	Northern France	25 July 1944 – 14 September 1944	532d Bombardment Squadron
	Rhineland	15 September 1944 – 21 March 1945	532d Bombardment Squadron
	Ardennes-Alsace	16 December 1944 – 25 January 1945	532d Bombardment Squadron
	Central Europe	22 March 1944 – 21 May 1945	532d Bombardment Squadron

== See also ==
- List of United States Air Force missile squadrons
- B-17 Flying Fortress units of the United States Army Air Forces
