= 307th Division =

307th Division may refer to:

- 307th Rifle Division, Soviet Union
- 307th Air Division, United States

== See also ==
- List of military divisions by number
