= 577th Strategic Missile Squadron =

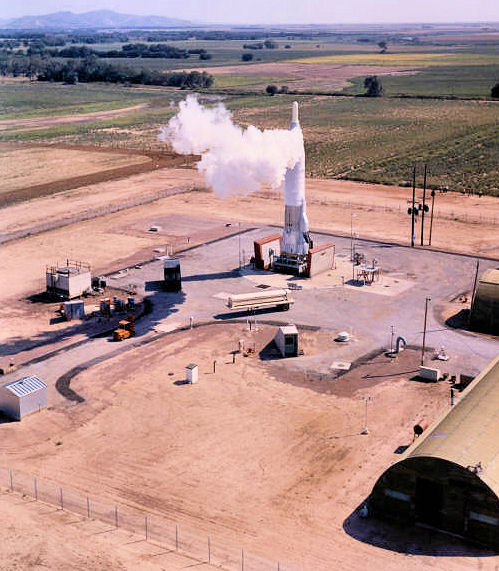
- Squadron SM-65F Atlas (Note: Missile is Convair SM-65F Atlas No. 56, at Site 577-11, Willow, Oklahoma.)
- Active: 1943–1945; 1947–1949; 1961–1965
- Country: United States
- Branch: United States Air Force
- Type: Squadron
- Role: Intercontinental ballistic missile
- Engagements: European Theater of Operations
- Decorations: Distinguished Unit Citation

Insignia
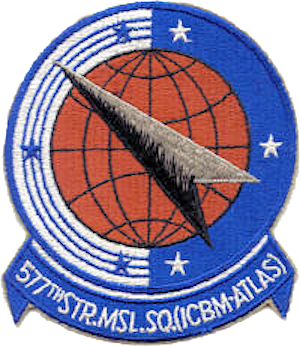
- 577th Strategic Missile Squadron emblem (Note: Approved 1 February 1962. Description: On a disc per pale)
- World War II fuselage code: DC

The 577th Strategic Missile Squadron is an inactive United States Air Force unit. It was last assigned to the 11th Strategic Aerospace Wing, stationed at Altus Air Force Base, Oklahoma.

The unit was first established in January 1943 as the 577th Bombardment Squadron. After training with Consolidated B-24 Liberators in the United States, the squadron deployed to the European Theater of Operations, where it participated in the strategic bombing campaign against Germany. The squadron was awarded a Distinguished Unit Citation for its actions in an attack on Gotha, Germany in February 1944. Following V-E Day, the squadron returned to the United States and was inactivated. It was again active between September 1947 and June 1949 in the reserve, but does not appear to have been fully manned or equipped with tactical aircraft at this time.

On 1 July 1961, the squadron went on alert as a Strategic Air Command intercontinental ballistic missile squadron, equipped with the SM-65F Atlas, with a mission of nuclear deterrence. The squadron was inactivated as part of the phaseout of the Atlas ICBM on 25 March 1965.

== History ==
=== World War II ===
==== Organization and training ====
The squadron was first activated at Davis-Monthan Field, Arizona, on 26 January 1943 as the 577th Bombardment Squadron, one of the four original squadrons of the 392d Bombardment Group. The squadron was equipped with Consolidated B-24 Liberators, completing its training in July. Its ground echelon departed its last training base, Alamogordo Army Air Field, New Mexico on 18 July for the New York Port of Embarkation, sailing on 25 July for the United Kingdom, while the air echelon ferried their Liberators across the Atlantic.

==== Combat in the European Theater ====
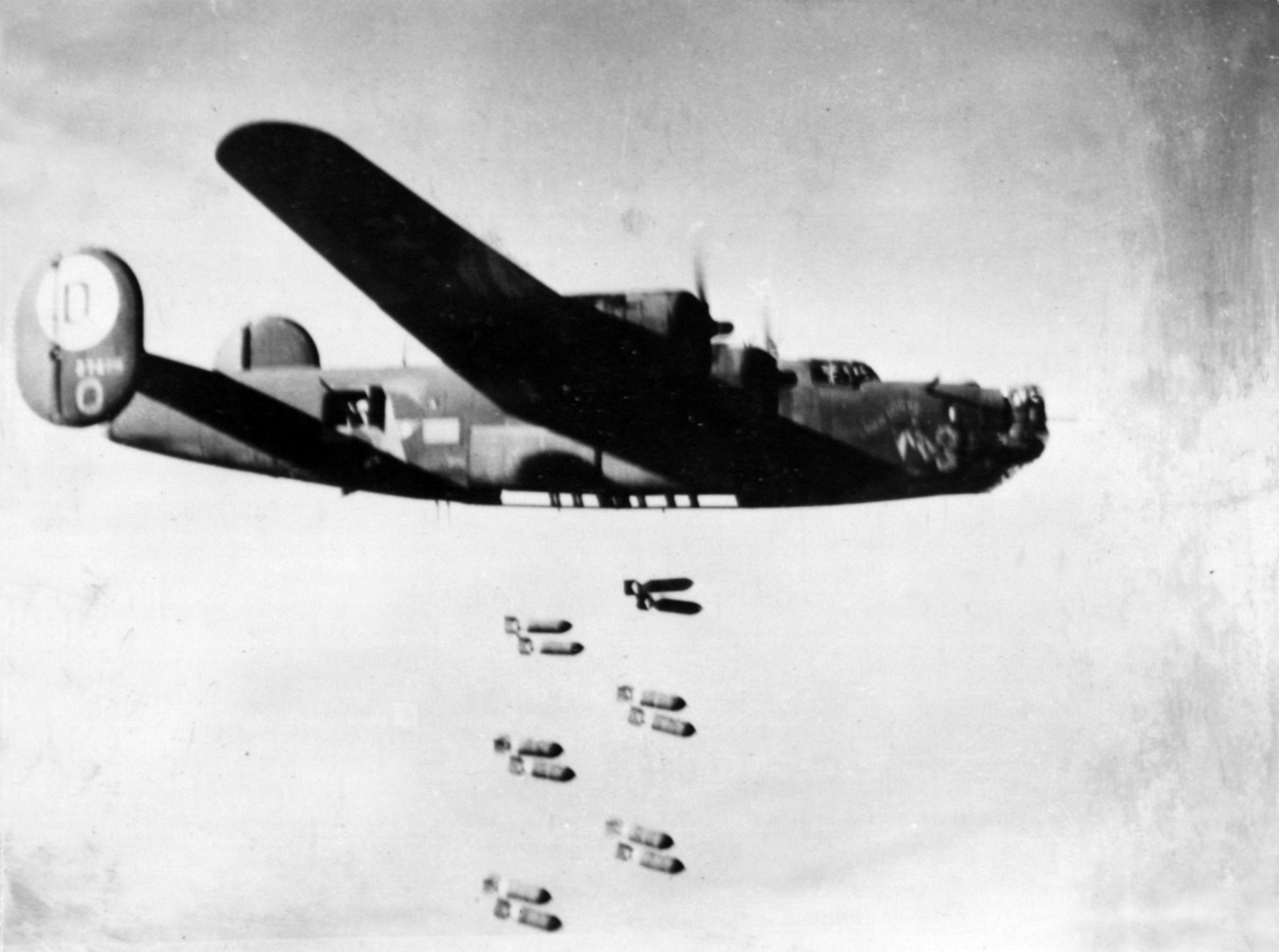
392nd Bombardment Group B-24 Liberator dropping bombs (Note: Aircraft is Ford built Consolidated B-24H-1-FO Liberator, serial 42-7479. This aircraft was lost on the 4 January 1944 mission to Kiel, Germany, with the loss of the entire crew.)

The ground echelon arrived in the United Kingdom on 30 July and arrived at RAF Wendling, the squadron's combat station, the following day. The air echelon had arrived at the station by 15 August. The squadron flew its first combat mission on 9 September. Most of the established B-24 units of VIII Bomber Command were deployed to reinforce efforts in the Mediterranean Theater of Operations when the squadron began operations, and during September and until the other Liberator units returned in early October, the squadron was primarily involved in flying decoy missions near the North Sea, while the command's main raids were being conducted by its Boeing B-17 Flying Fortresses. Until April 1945, the squadron was primarily engaged in the strategic bombing campaign against Germany. Strategic targets included an oil refinery at Geilenkirchen, a marshalling yard at Osnabruck, a railway viaduct at Bielefeld, steel plants at Braunschweig an armored vehicle factory at Kassel and gas works at Berlin.

The squadron participated in the heavy attacks against the German aircraft manufacturing industry during Big Week in late February 1944. During this campaign it earned a Distinguished Unit Citation for an attack on a component manufacturing plant for the Messerschmitt Me 210 at Gotha. The squadron formed part of the group leading the second wing in the attack. It began to experience heavy fighter opposition soon after crossing the coast in the Netherlands. Although the trailing elements of the first wing to attack had missed the target when a wounded lead bombardier collapsed and inadvertently toggled the plane's bombs, the 392d Group did not follow that formation, but attacked the Gotha factory with an extremely accurate bomb run with 98% of its bombs falling within 2000 feet of the aiming point. Despite losses, the plant was put out of commission for an estimated six to seven weeks.

The squadron was sometimes diverted from its strategic mission to perform air support and interdiction missions. In preparing for Operation Overlord, the invasion of Normandy, it participated in Operation Crossbow, attacking V-1 flying bomb and V-2 rocket launching sites, and airfields. On D-Day, it struck coastal defenses and choke points. It struck enemy positions opposing Operation Cobra, the breakout at Saint Lo in July 1944. During the Battle of the Bulge in December 1944 and January 1945, it bombed railroads, bridges and highways to break German lines of communication. It supported airborne attacks by dropping supplies, both near Arnhem in the Netherlands for Operation Market Garden in September 1944 and during Operation Varsity, the airborne assault across the Rhine in March 1945.

==== Return to the United States and inactivation ====
The squadron flew its last combat mission on 25 April 1945. Flooding in areas of the Netherlands not occupied by the Allies had reduced the Dutch population to near starvation. During the first week of May, the squadron flew missions dropping food for the population. The first squadron Liberators departed for the United States on 29 May 1945. Ground personnel sailed on the RMS Queen Mary on 15 June, arriving at the New York Port of Embarkation on 20 June. After leave, the squadron reassembled at Charleston Army Air Field, South Carolina, to perform airlift duties, but apparently was not fully manned or equipped before inactivating on 13 September 1945.

=== Reserve operations ===
The squadron was reactivated at Adams Field, Arkansas on 25 August 1947 as a very heavy bombardment squadron. Its training was supervised by Air Defense Command (ADC)'s 176th AAF Base Unit. It does not appear that the squadron was fully manned or equipped with tactical aircraft during this period. In 1948, Continental Air Command assumed responsibility for managing reserve and Air National Guard units from ADC. However, President Truman's reduced 1949 defense budget required reductions in the number of units in the Air Force, and the squadron was inactivated on 27 June 1949.

=== Intercontinental ballistic missile squadron ===
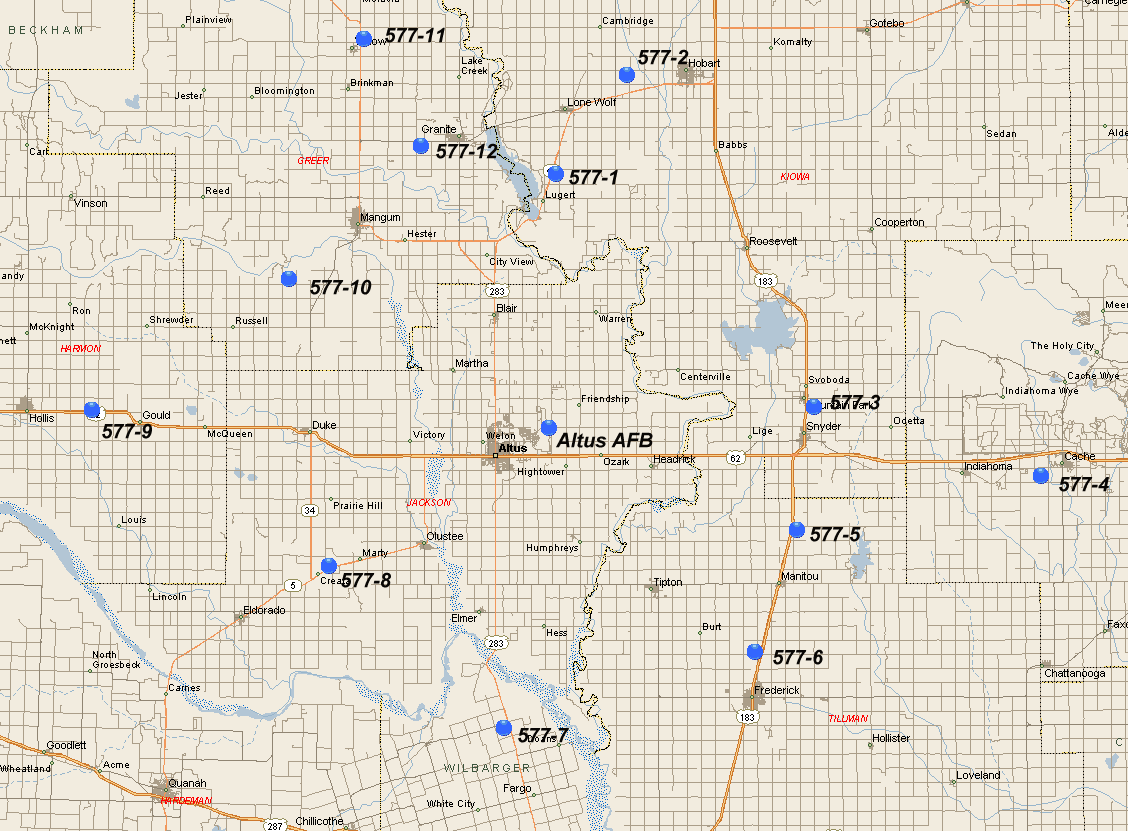
577th Atlas missile sites

The squadron was redesignated the 577th Strategic Missile Squadron and organized in June 1961 at Altus Air Force Base, Oklahoma, where it was assigned to the 11th Bombardment Wing. (Note: In February 1963, Strategic Air Command bombardment wings that operated both bombers and missiles were redesignated strategic aerospace wings.) In August 1962, the squadron was the first to place an Atlas F missile on alert status. (Note: Earlier models of the Atlas had been placed on alert, but the F model with which the 577th was equipped was the first to be in a protected silo, although it had to be elevated above ground before it could be launched. Narducci, p. 10.) The squadron was assigned twelve missiles, with twelve independent widely dispersed launch sites. The Atlas F used all inertial guidance and had more powerful engines and improved reentry vehicles than earlier models. The Atlas Fs were stored in a silo lift launcher. The missile was stored on its launcher in a hardened silo, but was lifted along with its launcher above ground before launch. The SM-65F was designed for long-term storage of liquid fuel and shortened countdown

Missile sites

577–1 2.2 mi NNE of Lugert, Oklahoma 34°55′32″N 099°15′35″W
577–2 3.8 mi SSE of Cambridge, Oklahoma 35°01′34″N 099°10′14″W
577–3 0.8 mi SE of Mountain Park, Oklahoma 34°41′16″N 098°56′27″W
577–4 2.1 mi WSW of Cache, Oklahoma 34°36′56″N 098°39′39″W
577–5 4.0 mi NNE of Manitou, Oklahoma 34°33′44″N 098°57′43″W
577–6 2.2 mi NNE of Frederick, Oklahoma 34°26′18″N 099°00′53″W
577–7 4.8 mi SE of Ranchland, Texas 34°21′43″N 099°19′27″W
577–8 0.6 mi NE of Creta, Oklahoma 34°31′36″N 099°32′24″W
577–9 3.7 mi NNW of Gould, Oklahoma 34°41′05″N 099°50′02″W
577–10 6.2 mi SW of Mangum, Oklahoma 34°49′04″N 099°35′26″W
577–11 1.0 mi NE of Willow, Oklahoma 35°03′43″N 099°29′49″W
577–12 2.7 mi WSW of Granite, Oklahoma 34°57′13″N 099°25′37″W

On 20 October 1962, after the detection of Soviet missiles in Cuba, Strategic Air Command (SAC) directed the squadron to reinstate all "degraded" missiles to alert status. (Note: Degraded sorties included missiles withdrawn from alert for modifications and those being used for operational readiness training. Kipp, et al., p. 62.) SAC directed that this be done "as covertly as possible", for it was not until 22 October that President John F. Kennedy announced the presence of the Soviet missiles publicly. Atlas F missiles used for operational readiness training would be put on alert as soon as liquid oxygen became available, All squadron missiles were placed on alert during the crisis.

The Atlas squadron at Plattsburgh Air Force Base, New York lacked sufficient qualified crews to man its sites and bring its missiles to alert status. SAC directed the 577th to send two crews to augment the 556th Strategic Missile Squadron on 29 October and two more crews three days later. These crews remained at Plattsburgh until 17 November. On 15 November, SAC directed that the squadron would be permitted to remove one of its missiles from alert to perform operational training and "shakedown" testing. From 3 November the number of alert missiles was reduced until on 29 November the number was the same as before the crisis.

On 14 May 1964, during a propellant loading exercise at the squadron's Site 577–6, an explosion occurred that destroyed the launch complex. The missile involved had been turned over to engineers from General Dynamics for modification and the exercise was being performed in conjunction with the return of the missile to SAC control.

On 19 November 1964, Secretary of Defense Robert S. McNamara announced that, in addition to the phaseout of the SM-65D and SM-65E models, announced earlier, all SM-65F Atlas missiles would be phased out by the end of June 1965, in Project Added Effort. Prior to the scheduled stand-down, in December, one of the squadron's missiles required extensive maintenance and was removed from alert to avoid the necessity for expensive repairs. The squadron was inactivated on 25 March 1965.

== Lineage ==
- Constituted 577th Bombardment Squadron (Heavy) on 15 January 1943

Activated on 26 January 1943
Inactivated on 13 September 1945

- Redesignated 577th Bombardment Squadron, Very Heavy on 13 August 1947

Activated in the reserve on 25 August 1947
Inactivated on 27 June 1949

- Redesignated 577th Strategic Missile Squadron (ICBM-Atlas) and activated on 25 January 1961 (not organized)

Organized on 1 June 1961
Inactivated on 25 March 1965

=== Assignments ===
- 392nd Bombardment Group, 26 January 1943 – 13 September 1945
- 392nd Bombardment Group, 25 August 1947 – 27 June 1949
- Strategic Air Command, 25 January 1961 (not organized)
- 11th Bombardment Wing (later 11th Strategic Aerospace Wing), 1 June 1961 – 25 March 1965

=== Stations ===
- Davis-Monthan Field, Arizona, 26 January 1943
- Biggs Field, Texas, 1 March 1943
- Alamogordo Army Air Field, New Mexico, 18 April – 18 July 1943
- RAF Wendling (AAF-118), England, 1 August 1943 – c. 7 June 1945
- Charleston Army Air Field, South Carolina, 23 June – 13 September 1945
- Adams Field, Arkansas, 25 August 1947 – 27 June 1949
- Altus Air Force Base, Oklahoma, 1 June 1961 – 25 March 1965

=== Aircraft and missiles ===
- Consolidated B-24 Liberator, 1943–1945
- Convair SM-65F Atlas, 1961–1965

=== Awards and campaigns ===
Award streamer	Award	Dates	Notes
	Distinguished Unit Citation	24 February 1944	577th Bombardment Squadron Gotha, Germany

Campaign Streamer	Campaign	Dates	Notes
	Air Offensive, Europe	31 July 1943 – 5 June 1944	577th Bombardment Squadron
	Air Combat, EAME Theater	31 July 1943 – 11 May 1945	577th Bombardment Squadron
	Normandy	6 June 1944 – 24 July 1944	577th Bombardment Squadron
	Northern France	25 July 1944 – 14 September 1944	577th Bombardment Squadron
	Rhineland	15 September 1944 – 21 March 1945	577th Bombardment Squadron
	Ardennes-Alsace	16 December 1944 – 25 January 1945	577th Bombardment Squadron
	Central Europe	22 March 1944 – 21 May 1945	577th Bombardment Squadron

== See also ==
- List of United States Air Force missile squadrons
