= 578th Strategic Missile Squadron =

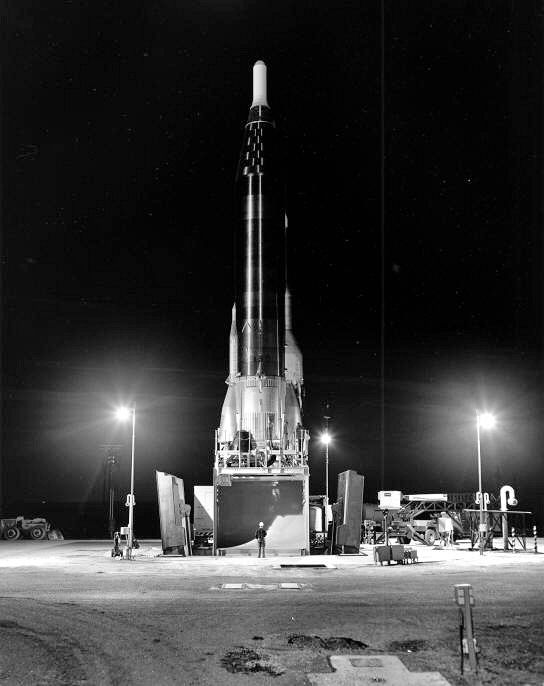
- Convair SM-65F Atlas at Site 578-12 Corinth, Texas
- Active: 1943–1945; 1947–1949; 1961–1965
- Country: United States
- Branch: United States Air Force
- Type: Squadron
- Role: Intercontinental ballistic missile
- Motto: Pax Per Potentem Latin Peace Through Power
- Engagements: European Theater of Operations
- Decorations: Distinguished Unit Citation

Insignia
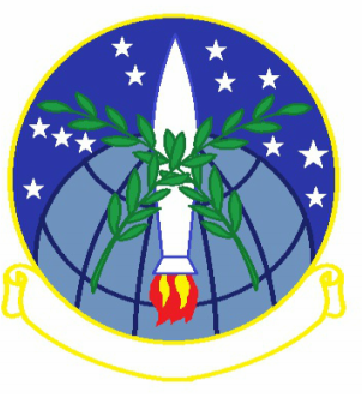
- 578th Strategic Missile Squadron emblem
- World War II fuselage code: EC
- World War II group tail code: Circle D

The 578th Strategic Missile Squadron is an inactive United States Air Force unit. It was last assigned to the 96th Strategic Aerospace Wing at Dyess Air Force Base, Texas, where it served from July 1961 until it was inactivated as part of the phaseout of the SM-65F Atlas intercontinental ballistic missile on 25 March 1965.

The squadron was first organized during World War II as the 578th Bombardment Squadron, a heavy bomber unit. After training with Consolidated B-24 Liberators in the United States, the unit deployed to the European Theater of Operations, where it participated in the strategic bombing campaign against Germany. The squadron was awarded a Distinguished Unit Citation for its actions in an attack against Gotha, Germany in 1944. It returned to the United States after V-E Day, but was inactivated in September 1945. From 1947 to 1949, the squadron was active in the reserve, but was apparently not fully manned or equipped with operational aircraft.

== History ==
=== World War II ===
==== Organization and training ====
The squadron was first activated at Davis-Monthan Field, Arizona in January 1943 as the 578th Bombardment Squadron, one of the original four squadrons of the 392nd Bombardment Group. The squadron trained with Consolidated B-24 Liberators at bases in the southwestern United States, completing its training in July. On 18 July 1943, the squadron's ground echelon left its last training base, Alamogordo Army Air Field for the New York Port of Embarkation, sailing for the European Theater of Operations a week later, while the air echelon ferried their Liberators across the Atlantic.

==== Combat in the European Theater ====
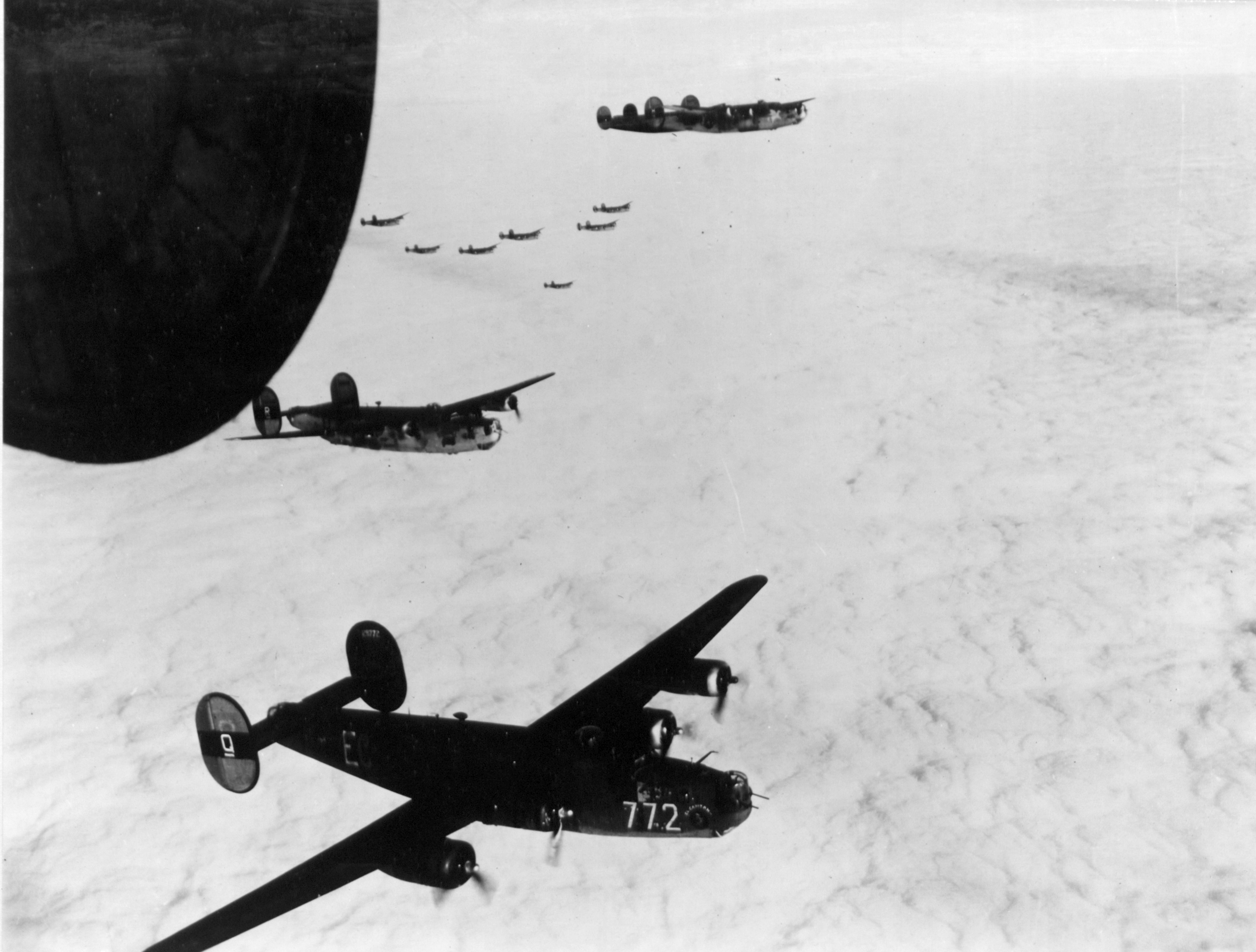
392d Bombardment Group Liberators

The squadron arrived at its combat station, RAF Wendling on 1 August 1943 and flew its first combat mission on 9 September.

The ground echelon arrived in the United Kingdom on 30 July and arrived at RAF Wendling, the squadron's combat station, the following day. The air echelon had arrived at the station by 15 August. The squadron flew its first combat mission on 9 September. Most of the established B-24 units of VIII Bomber Command were deployed to reinforce efforts in the Mediterranean Theater of Operations when the squadron began operations, and during September and until the other Liberator units returned in early October, the squadron was primarily involved in flying decoy missions near the North Sea, while the command's main raids were being conducted by its Boeing B-17 Flying Fortresses. Until April 1945, the squadron was primarily engaged in the strategic bombing campaign against Germany. Strategic targets included an oil refinery at Geilenkirchen, a marshalling yard at Osnabruck, a railway viaduct at Bielefeld, steel plants at Braunschweig an armored vehicle factory at Kassel and gas works at Berlin.

The squadron participated in the heavy attacks against the German aircraft manufacturing industry during Big Week in late February 1944. During this campaign it earned a Distinguished Unit Citation for an attack on a component manufacturing plant for the Messerschmitt Me 210 at Gotha. The squadron formed part of the group leading the second wing in the attack. It began to experience heavy fighter opposition soon after crossing the coast in the Netherlands. Although the trailing elements of the first wing to attack had missed the target when a wounded lead bombardier collapsed and inadvertently toggled the plane's bombs, the 392d Group did not follow that formation, but attacked the Gotha factory with an extremely accurate bomb run with 98% of its bombs falling within 2000 feet of the aiming point. Despite losses, the plant was put out of commission for an estimated six to seven weeks.

The squadron was sometimes diverted from its strategic mission to perform air support and interdiction missions. In preparing for Operation Overlord, the invasion of Normandy, it participated in Operation Crossbow, attacking V-1 flying bomb and V-2 rocket launching sites, and airfields. On D-Day, it struck coastal defenses and choke points. It struck enemy positions opposing Operation Cobra, the breakout at Saint Lo in July 1944. During the Battle of the Bulge in December 1944 and January 1945, it bombed railroads, bridges and highways to break German lines of communication. It supported airborne attacks by dropping supplies, both near Arnhem in the Netherlands for Operation Market Garden in September 1944 and during Operation Varsity, the airborne assault across the Rhine in March 1945.

==== Return to the United States and inactivation ====
The squadron flew its last combat mission on 25 April 1945. Flooding in areas of the Netherlands not occupied by the Allies had reduced the Dutch population to near starvation. During the first week of May, the squadron flew missions dropping food for the population. The first squadron Liberators departed for the United States on 29 May 1945. Ground personnel sailed on the RMS Queen Mary on 15 June, arriving at the New York Port of Embarkation on 20 June. After leave, the squadron reassembled at Charleston Army Air Field, South Carolina, to perform airlift duties, but apparently was not fully manned or equipped before inactivating on 13 September 1945.

=== Air Force reserve ===
On 9 September 1947, the squadron was activated in the reserve under Air Defense Command (ADC) at Barksdale Field, Louisiana, where its training was supervised by the 174th AAF Base Unit (later the 2509th Air Force Reserve Training Center). It is not clear whether or not the squadron was fully staffed or equipped at this time. In 1948 Continental Air Command assumed responsibility for managing reserve and Air National Guard units from ADC.

The May 1949 Air Force Reserve program called for a new type of unit, the Corollary unit, which was a reserve unit integrated with an active duty unit. The plan called for corollary units at 107 locations. It was viewed as the best method to train reservists by mixing them with an existing regular unit to perform duties alongside the regular unit. The 47th Bombardment Wing had moved to Barksdale in 1948, and on 27 June 1949, the squadron became a light bomber squadron as a corollary of the 47th Wing, flying its Douglas B-26 Invaders. However, President Truman’s reduced 1949 defense budget required reductions in the number of units in the Air Force, and the 47th Wing was inactivated in October 1949. As a result, the 578th was also inactivated on 10 November 1949.

=== Intercontinental ballistic missile squadron ===
The squadron was redesignated the 578th Strategic Missile Squadron and organized in July 1961 at Dyess Air Force Base, Texas, where it was assigned to the 96th Bombardment Wing. (Note: In February 1963, Strategic Air Command bombardment wings that operated both bombers and missiles were redesignated strategic aerospace wings.) The squadron was assigned twelve missiles, with twelve independent widely dispersed launch sites. The Atlas F used all inertial guidance and had more powerful engines and improved reentry vehicles than earlier models. The Atlas Fs were stored in a silo lift launcher. The missile was stored on its launcher in a hardened silo, but was lifted along with its launcher above ground before launch. The SM-65F was designed for long term storage of liquid fuel and shortened countdown

Missile sites

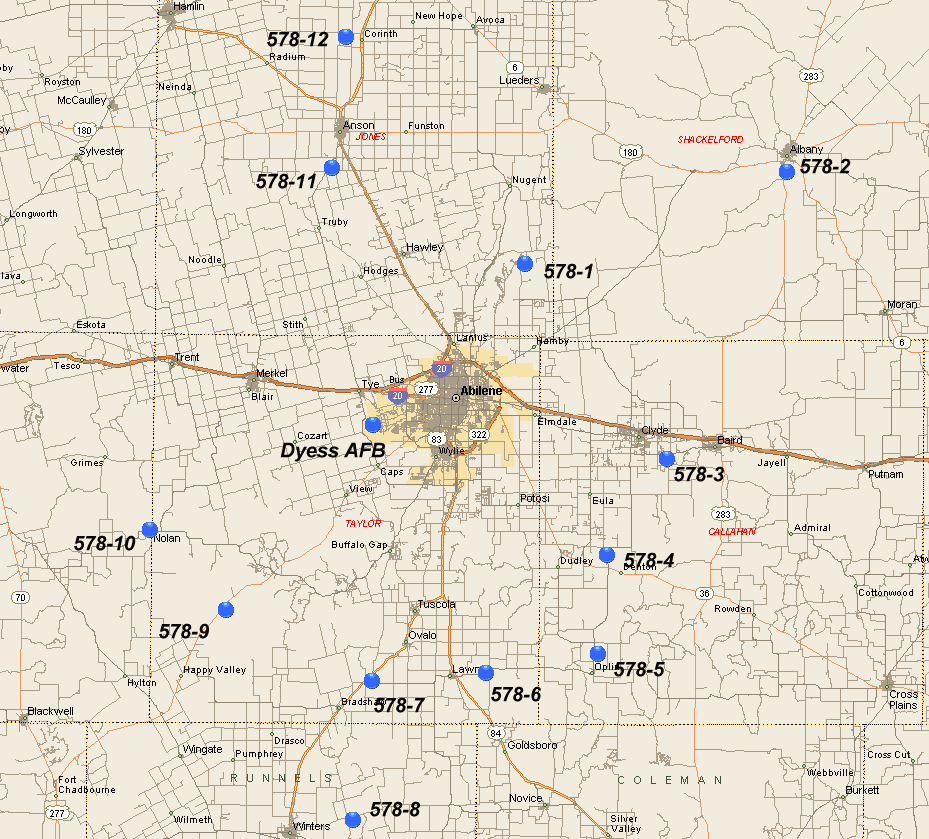
578th Atlas Missile Sites

578–1 1.5 mi SE of Lake Fort Phantom Hill, Texas 32°36′09″N 099°38′59″W
578–2 1.5 mi S of Albany, Texas 32°42′23″N 099°17′51″W
578–3 2.5 mi SE of Clyde, Texas 32°22′54″N 099°27′37″W
578–4 9.6 mi SSW of Clyde, Texas 32°16′25″N 099°32′28″W
578–5 1.5 mi SE of Lake Coleman, Texas 32°09′42″N 099°33′10″W
578–6 2.7 mi E of Lawn, Texas 32°08′25″N 099°42′12″W
578–7 3.4 mi NE of Bradshaw, Texas 32°07′51″N 099°51′18″W
578–8 4.9 mi ENE of Winters, Texas 31°58′24″N 099°52′48″W
578–9 11.9 mi NW of Bradshaw, Texas 32°12′37″N 100°03′03″W
578–10 13.1 mi S of Trent, Texas 32°18′05″N 100°09′11″W
578–11 3.2 mi SSW of Anson, Texas 32°42′40″N 099°54′34″W
578–12 7.52 mi N of Anson, Texas 32°51′37″N 099°53′29″W

On 20 October 1962, after the detection of Soviet missiles in Cuba, Strategic Air Command (SAC) directed the squadron to reinstate all "degraded" missiles to alert status. (Note: Degraded sorties included missiles withdrawn from alert for modifications and those being used for operational readiness training. Kipp, et al., p. 62.) SAC directed that this be done "as covertly as possible", for it was not until 22 October that President John F. Kennedy announced the presence of Soviet the missiles publicly. Atlas F missiles used for operational readiness training would be put on alert as soon as liquid oxygen became available, On 15 November, SAC directed that the squadron would be permitted to remove one of its missiles from alert to perform operational training and "shakedown" testing.

SAC also invoked the SAC/Air Force Systems Command (AFSC) Agreement for Emergency Combat Capability, which called for AFSC to turn over missiles still under its control to SAC to place them on alert. As a result an additional missile was turned over to the squadron to be placed on alert. On 15 November, SAC directed that the squadron would be permitted to remove one of its missiles from alert to perform operational training and "shakedown" testing. From 3 November the number of alert missiles was reduced until on 29 November the number was the same as before the crisis.

On 19 November 1964, Secretary of Defense Robert S. McNamara announced that, in addition to the phaseout of the SM-65D and SM-65E models, announced earlier, all SM-65F Atlas missiles would be phased out by the end of June 1965, in Project Added Effort. The first missile of the 578th Squadron was removed from alert in December to avoid the necessity for expensive repairs just before inactivation. The squadron was inactivated on 25 March 1965.

== Lineage ==
- Constituted as the 578th Bombardment Squadron (Heavy) on 15 January 1943

Activated on 26 January 1943
Redesignated 578th Bombardment Squadron, Heavy on 20 August 1943
Inactivated on 13 September 1945

- Redesignated 578th Bombardment Squadron, Very Heavy on 13 August 1947

Activated in the reserve on 9 September 1947
Redesignated 578th Bombardment Squadron, Light on 27 June 1949
Inactivated on 10 November 1949

- Redesignated 578th Strategic Missile Squadron (ICBM-Atlas) and activated, on 25 January 1961 (not organized)

Organized on 1 July 1961
Inactivated on 25 March 1965

=== Assignments ===
- 392nd Bombardment Group, 26 January 1943 – 13 September 1945
- 392nd Bombardment Group, 9 September 1947 – 10 November 1949
- Strategic Air Command, 25 January 1961 (not organized)
- 96th Bombardment Wing (later 96th Strategic Aerospace Wing), 1 July 1961 – 25 March 1965

=== Stations ===
- Davis-Monthan Field, Arizona, 26 January 1943
- Biggs Field, Texas, 1 March 1943
- Alamogordo Army Air Field, New Mexico, 18 April – 18 July 1943
- RAF Wendling (AAF-118), England, 1 August 1943 – c. 7 June 1945
- Charleston Army Air Field, South Carolina, 23 June – 13 September 1945
- Barksdale Field (later Barksdale Air Force Base), Louisiana, 9 September 1947 – 10 November 1949
- Dyess Air Force Base, Texas, 1 July 1961 – 25 March 1965

=== Aircraft and missiles ===
- Consolidated B-24 Liberator, 1943–1945
- Convair SM-65F Atlas, 1961–1965

=== Awards and campaigns ===
Award streamer	Award	Dates	Notes
	Distinguished Unit Citation	24 February 1944	578th Bombardment Squadron Gotha, Germany

Campaign Streamer	Campaign	Dates	Notes
	Air Offensive, Europe	31 July 1943 – 5 June 1944	578th Bombardment Squadron
	Air Combat, EAME Theater	31 July 1943 – 11 May 1945	578th Bombardment Squadron
	Normandy	6 June 1944 – 24 July 1944	578th Bombardment Squadron
	Northern France	25 July 1944 – 14 September 1944	578th Bombardment Squadron
	Rhineland	15 September 1944 – 21 March 1945	578th Bombardment Squadron
	Ardennes-Alsace	16 December 1944 – 25 January 1945	578th Bombardment Squadron
	Central Europe	22 March 1944 – 21 May 1945	578th Bombardment Squadron

== See also ==
- List of United States Air Force missile squadrons
