= 392d Air Expeditionary Group =

392d Air Expeditionary Group

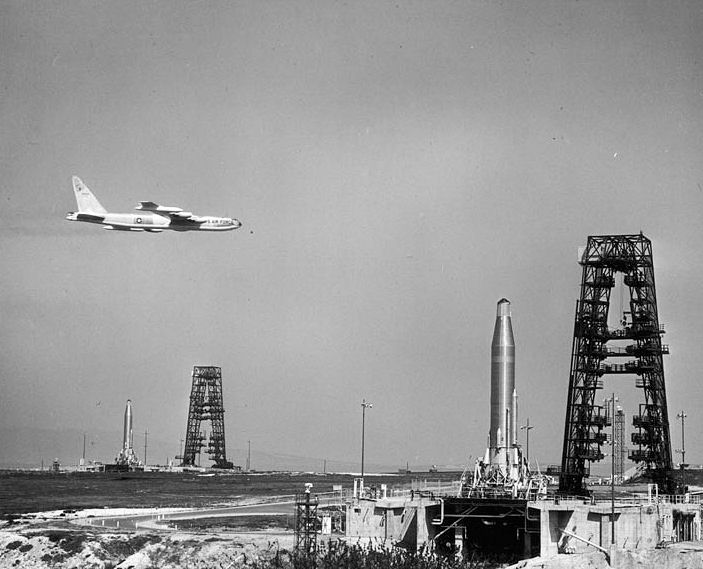
- Atlas missiles at Vandenberg Air Force Base
- Active: 1943–1945, 1947–1949; 1961
- Country: United States
- Branch: United States Air Force
- Role: Expeditionary operations
- Part of: Air Combat Command
- Engagements: European Theater of Operations
- Decorations: Distinguished Unit Citation

Insignia
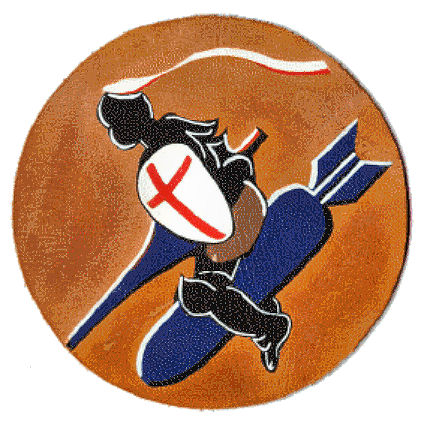
- Unofficial 392d Bombardment Group emblem
- VIII Bomber Command tail marking until May 1944: Circle D
- VIII Bomber Command tail marking after May 1944: White with 3-foot horizontal black stripe

The 392d Air Expeditionary Group is a provisional United States Air Force unit. It is assigned to Air Combat Command to activate or inactivate as needed. The group was last active as the 392d Strategic Missile Wing at Vandenberg Air Force Base, California, where it briefly operated three early models of intercontinental ballistic missile during 1961. In 1984, the wing was consolidated with the 392d Bombardment Group

During World War II, the 392d Bombardment Group was an Eighth Air Force Consolidated B-24 Liberator heavy bombardment group. The group flew combat missions from RAF Wendling in England, earning a Distinguished Unit Citation. The group flew 285 combat missions, suffering 1,552 casualties including 835 killed in action or line of duty and 184 aircraft lost. After VE Day the group returned to the United States and flew airlift missions until inactivated in September 1945.

The group was reactivated in the reserve in 1947 as a very heavy bomber group. In 1949, it converted to a light bomber group and was assigned to the wing under the wing base organization system. It was a corollary unit of the 47th Bombardment Group until inactivating in November 1949.

== History ==
=== World War II ===
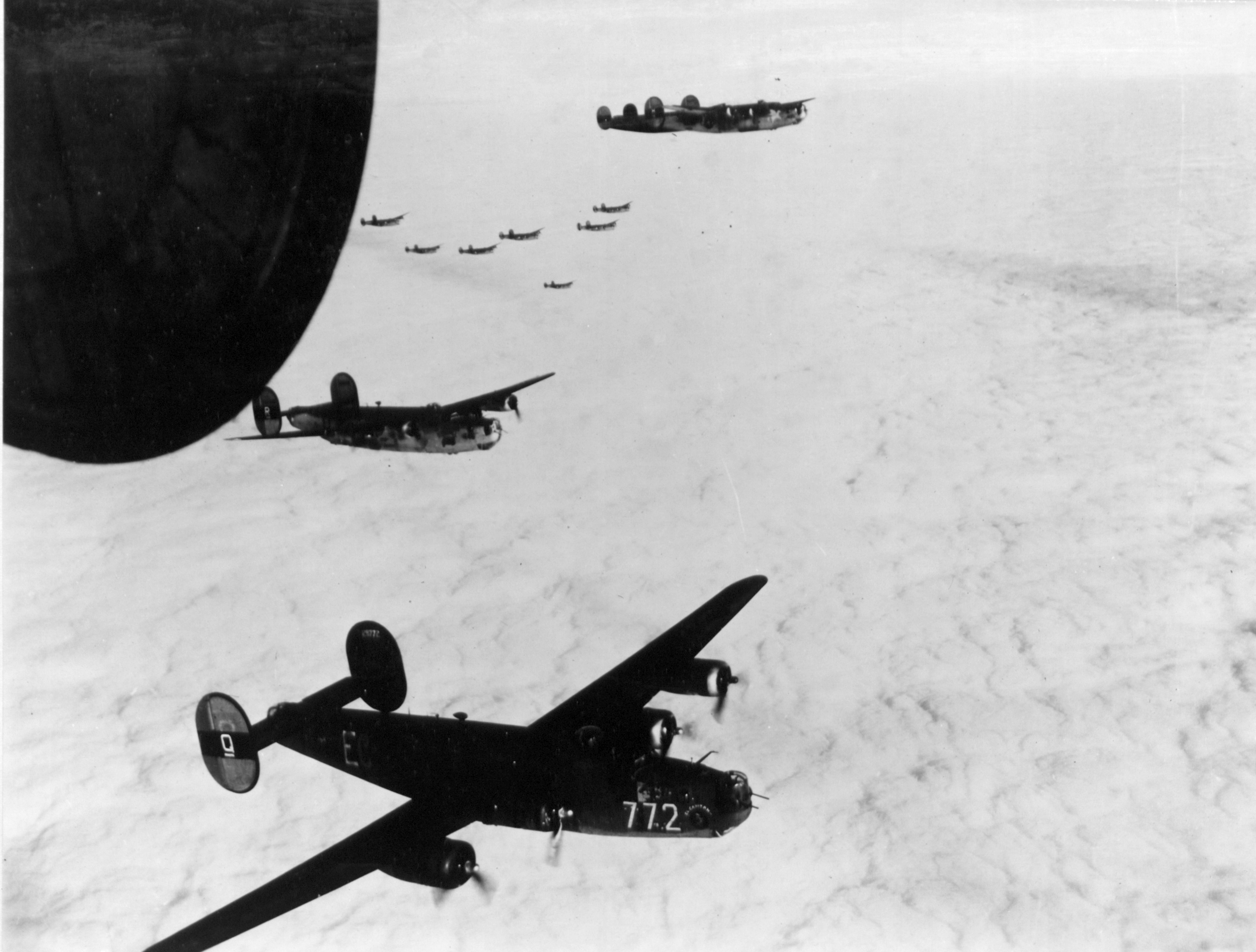
B-24 Liberators of the 392d Bomb Group on a mission over enemy-occupied territory.

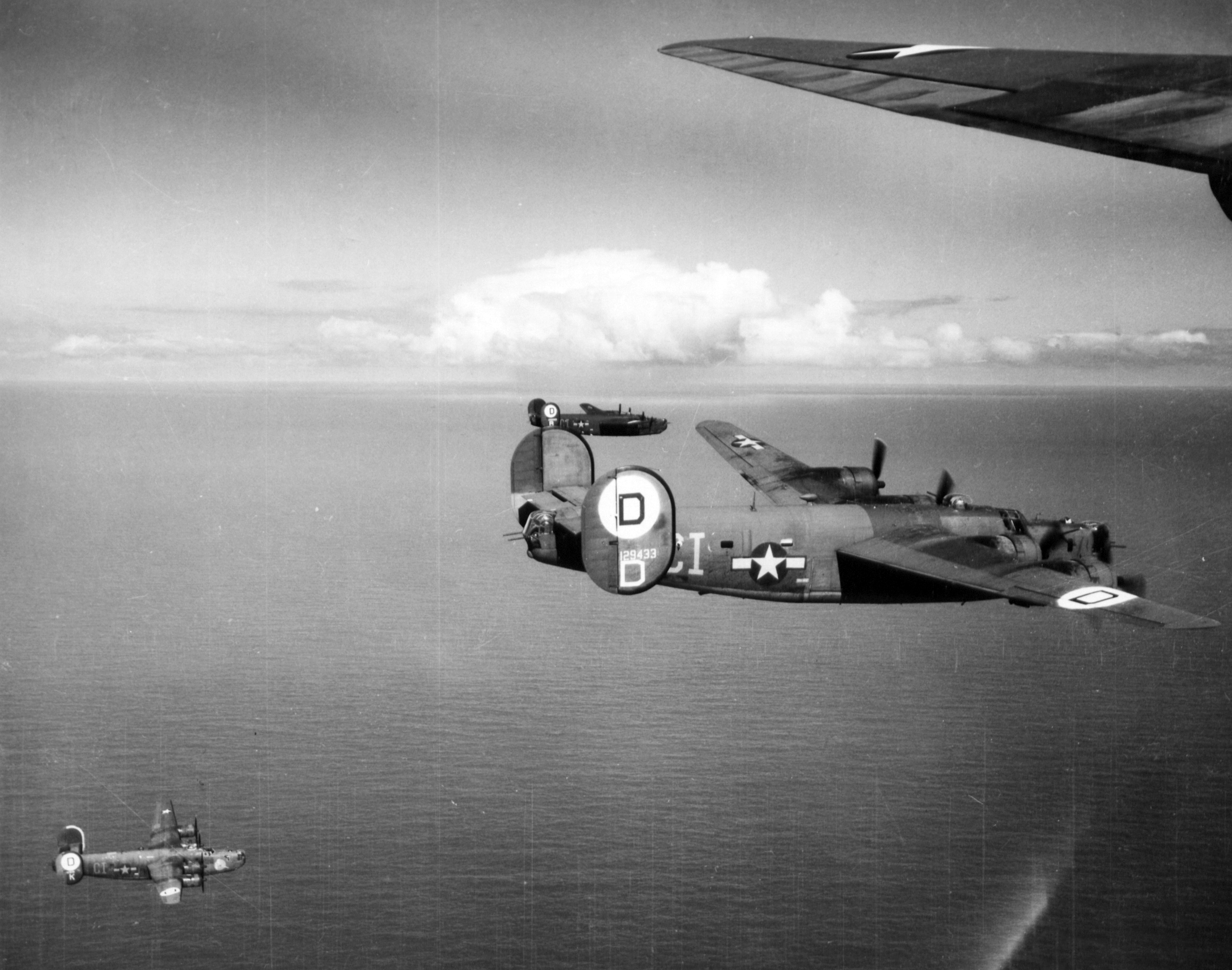
B-24 of the 576th Bomb Squadron (Note: Taken on a combat mission. Aircraft is Consolidated B-24H-15-CF Liberator serial 41-29433. This aircraft crash-landed 29 May 1944 at Sporle, near Little Fransham, UK.)

Activated 26 January 1943 at Davis Monthan AAFd, Arizona, and trained there until February 1943. The unit moved to Biggs Field, Texas, and in March 1943, and then to Alamogordo AAB, New Mexico on 18 April 1943. The ground unit left for the New York Port of Embarkation on 18 July 1943. The unit sailed out from New York on 25 July 1943, and arrived in England on 30 July 1943. Assigned to the Eighth Air Force at RAF Wendling in East Anglia. The group was assigned to the 14th Combat Bombardment Wing, and the group tail code was a "Circle-D".

The 392d BG entered combat on 9 September 1943 and engaged primarily in bombardment of strategic objectives on the Continent until April 1945. The group attacked such targets as an oil refinery at Gelsenkirchen, a marshalling yard at Osnabrück, a railroad viaduct at Bielefeld, steel plants at Brunswick, a tank factory at Kassel, and gas works at Berlin.

The group took part in the intensive campaign of heavy bombers against the German aircraft industry during Big Week, 20–25 February 1944, being awarded a Distinguished Unit Citation for bombing an aircraft and component parts factory at Gotha on 24 February. The unit sometimes supported ground forces or carried out interdictory operations along with bombing airfields and V-weapon sites in France prior to the Normandy invasion in June 1944 and struck coastal defenses and choke points on D-Day.

The group hit enemy positions to assist ground forces at Saint-Lô during the breakthrough in July 1944. Bombed railroads, bridges, and highways to cut off German supply lines during the Battle of the Bulge, December 1944 – January 1945. Dropped supplies to Allied troops during the air attack on the Netherlands in September 1944 and during the airborne assault across the Rhine in March 1945.

The 392d Bomb Group flew its last combat mission on 25 April 1945, then carried food to the Dutch. The unit returned to Charleston AAF South Carolina on 25 June 1945 and was inactivated on 13 September 1945.

Redeployed to the US May/June 1945. First of the aircraft departed the United Kingdom on 29 May 1945. Ground echelon sailed on Queen Mary on 15 June 1945, arriving in New York on 20 June 1945. Personnel had 30 days R and R with the unit assembling in Charleston AAFd, South Carolina, in late June 1945 for air transport duties but was not fully manned and inactivated on 13 September 1945.

=== Reserve operations ===
Reactivated as a reserve corollary of the 47th Bombardment Wing, Light in 1949.

=== Strategic missiles ===
The wing was reformed in 1961 to control missile training operations at Vandenberg Air Force Base, Lompoc, California. It operated the Atlas missile, with the 564th SMS (18 October 1961 – 20 December 1961) and the 565th SMS (1 July 1961 – 1 December 1964)and the Titan. However it was eliminated by a reorganization of 1st Strategic Aerospace Division.

=== Expeditionary operations ===
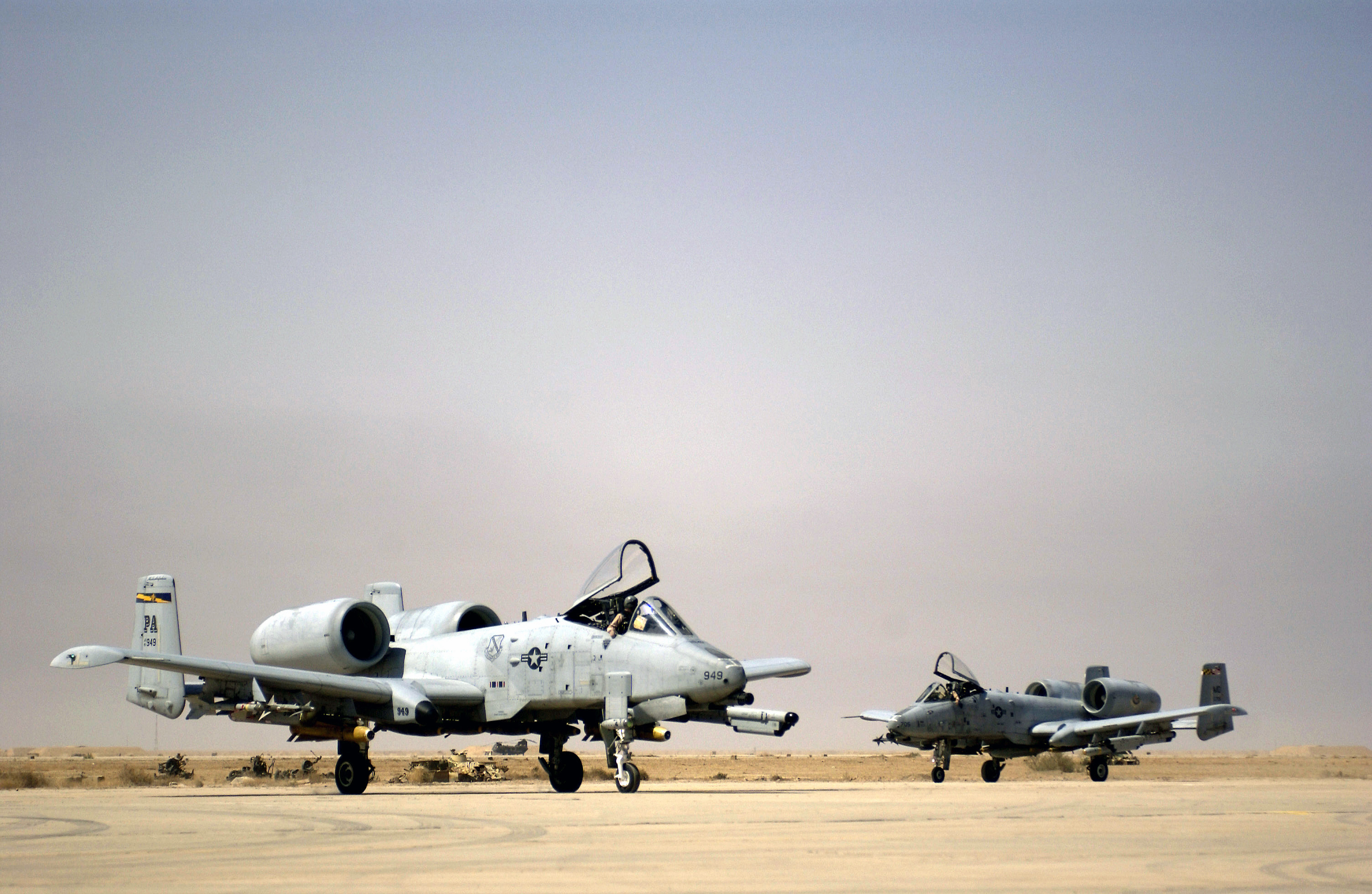
Maryland and Pennsylvania ANG A-10s in Iraq 2003

In 2003, the wing was converted to provisional status as the 392d Air Expeditionary Group and assigned to Air Combat Command to activate or inactivate as needed. Although details apparently remain classified, the group earned campaign credit for the Liberation of Iraq campaign. (Note: One web site suggests the group may have conducted operations with the Fairchild Republic A-10 Thunderbolt II at Talil Air Base. Warthog Deployments.)

The 103d Fighter Squadron and 104th Fighter Squadron (Maryland and Pennsylvania ANGs) apparently operated with the group during the Kuwait/Talil deployment.

== Lineage ==
392d Bombardment Group

- Constituted as the 392d Bombardment Group (Heavy) on 15 January 1943

Activated on 26 January 1943

- Redesignated 392d Bombardment Group, Heavy on 20 August 1943

Inactivated on 13 September 1945

- Redesignated 392d Bombardment Group, Very Heavy on 14 July 1947

Activated in the Reserve on 30 July 1947

- Redesignated 392d Bombardment Group, Light on 27 June 1949

Inactivated on 10 November 1949

- Consolidated with the 392d Strategic Missile Wing as the 392d Strategic Missile Wing on 31 January 1984

392d Air Expeditionary Group

- Established as the 392d Bombardment Wing, Light on 16 May 1949

Activated in the reserve on 27 June 1949
Inactivated on 10 November 1949

- Redesignated 392d Fighter-Day Wing on 23 March 1953
- Redesignated 392d Strategic Missile Wing and activated on 6 October 1961 (not organized)

Organized on 18 October 1961
Discontinued and inactivated on 20 December 1961

- Consolidated with the 392d Bombardment Group on 31 January 1984
- Redesignated 392d Air Expeditionary Group and converted to provisional status on 24 March 2003

=== Assignments ===
- II Bomber Command, 26 January 1943
- 2d Bombardment Wing, c. 1 August 1943 (attached to 202d Provisional Combat Bombardment Wing after 3 September 1943)
- 2d Bombardment Division, 13 September 1943
- 14th Combat Bombardment Wing, 14 September 1943
- 96th Combat Bombardment Wing, 1 June 1945
- Air Transport Command, c. 25 June – 13 September 1945
- 307th Bombardment Wing (later 307th Air Division), 30 July 1947
- Twelfth Air Force, 27 June – 10 November 1949 (attached to 47th Bombardment Wing (Light) until 2 October 1949
- Strategic Air Command, 6 October 1961 (not organized)
- 1st Strategic Aerospace Division, 18 October-20 December 1961
- Air Combat Command to activate or inactivate at any time after 24 March 2003

=== Components ===
Group

- 392d Bombardment Group, 27 June – 10 November 1949

Squadrons

- 576th Bombardment Squadron (later 576th Strategic Missile Squadron), 26 January 1943 – 13 September 1945; 24 September 1947 – 10 November 1949; 18 October-20 December 1961 (detached until 19 October and after 15 December 1961)
- 577th Bombardment Squadron, 26 January 1943 – 13 September 1945; 25 August 1947 – 27 June 1949
- 578th Bombardment Squadron, 26 January 1943 – 13 September 1945; 9 September 1947 – 10 November 1949
- 579th Bombardment Squadron, 26 January 1943 – 13 September 1945; 26 September 1947 – 27 June 1949

=== Stations ===
- Davis–Monthan Field, Arizona, 26 January 1943
- Biggs Field, Texas, 1 March 1943
- Alamogordo Army Air Field, New Mexico, 18 March– 18 July 1943
- RAF Wendling (USAAF Station 118), England, July 1943 – 15 June 1945
- Charleston Army Air Base, South Carolina, 25 June – 13 September 1945
- Barksdale Field (later Barksdale Air Force Base), Louisiana, 30 July 1947 – 10 November 1949
- Vandenberg Air Force Base, California, 18 October – 20 December 1961

=== Aircraft and missiles ===
- Consolidated B-24 Liberator, 1943–1945
- Douglas B-26 Invader, 1949
- SM-65 Atlas, 1961
- SM-68 Titan I, 1961
- SM-80 Minuteman I, 1961
