= 576th Flight Test Squadron =

US Air Force unit

576th Flight Test Squadron

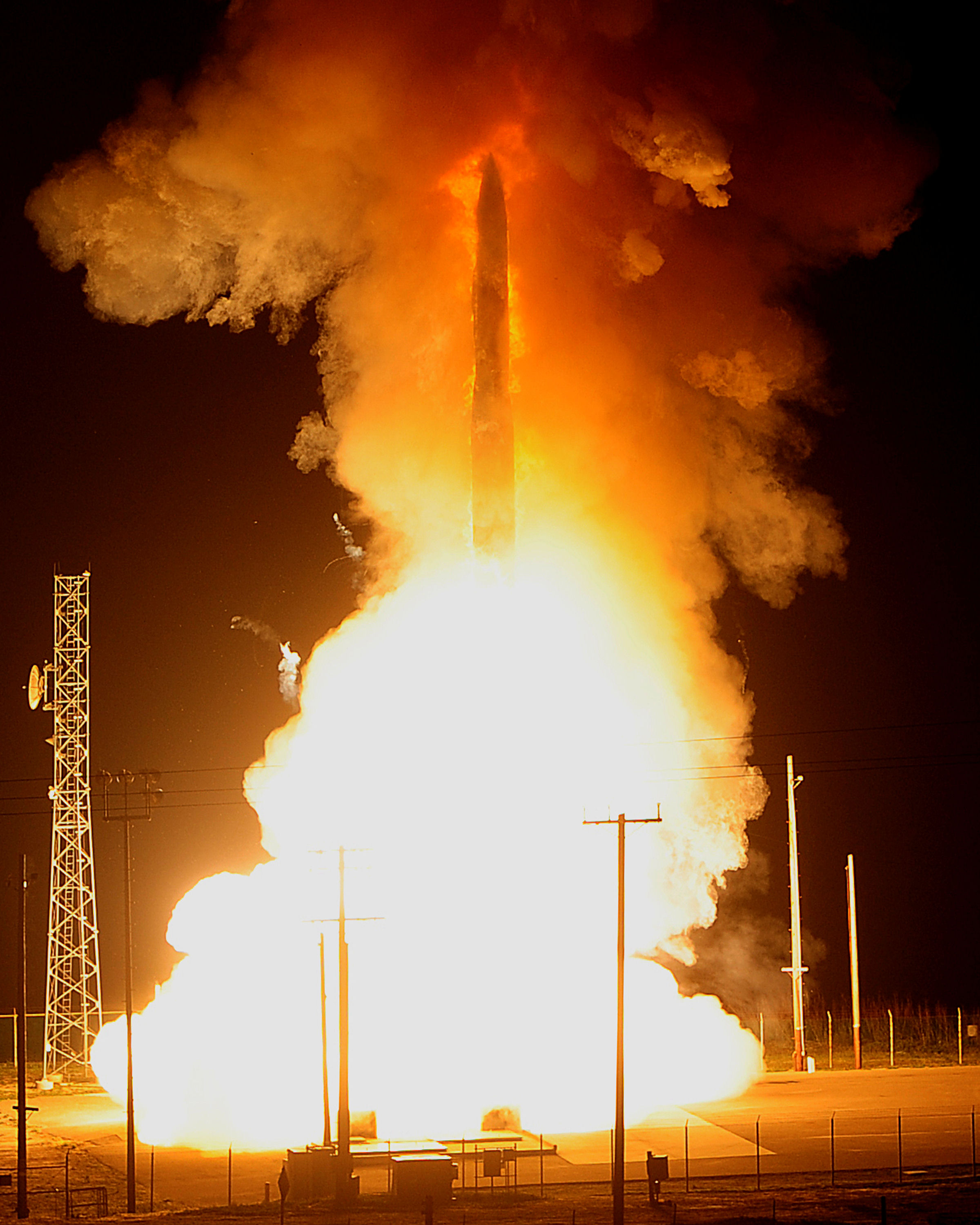
- 576th Squadron LGM-30G Minuteman III test launch at Vandenberg SFB, California, 25 February 2012
- Active: 1943–1945; 1947–1949; 1958–1966; 1991-present
- Country: United States
- Branch: United States Air Force
- Type: Squadron
- Role: Intercontinental ballistic missile testing
- Part of: Air Force Global Strike Command
- Garrison/HQ: Vandenberg SFB, California
- Motto: Ducimus (Latin for 'We Lead') (since 1959)
- Engagements: European Theater of Operations
- Decorations: Distinguished Unit Citation; Air Force Outstanding Unit Award; Air Force Organizational Excellence Award

Insignia
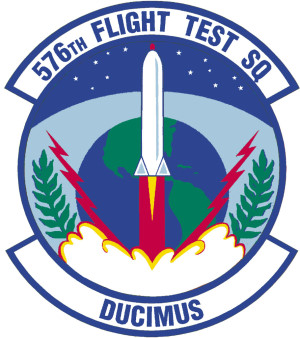
- 576th Flight Test Squadron emblem (Note: Approved 2 March 1995.)

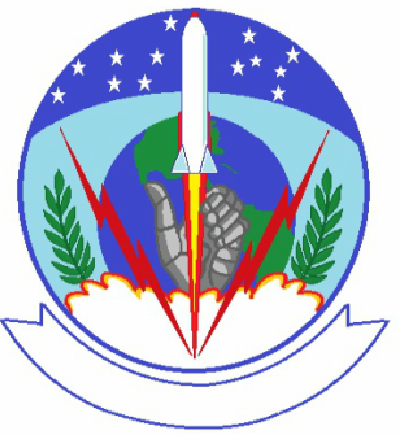
- 576th Strategic Missile Squadron emblem (Note: Approved 5 March 1959. Description: On a disc divided per fess enhanced arched, Air Force blue and light blue, an Air Force blue globe, land areas green, surmounted by a white cloud formation issuing from base edged Air Force golden yellow and red; issuing from the cloud an armored hand launching a missile in pale, all white, shaded light blue, outlines and details Air Force blue, the missile trimmed red and leaving trail of red and Air Force golden yellow flame to base, all between two red lightning flashes and two green olive branches radiating from cloud; in dexter chief six stars forming the Southern Cross and in sinister seven stars white forming the Big Dipper and Polaris.,)
- World War II fuselage code: CI

The 576th Flight Test Squadron is a United States Air Force unit assigned to Air Force Global Strike Command. The 576th is stationed at Vandenberg Space Force Base, California. The unit was first established in January 1943 as the 576th Bombardment Squadron. After training with Consolidated B-24 Liberators in the United States, the squadron deployed to the European Theater of Operations, where it participated in the strategic bombing campaign against Germany. The squadron was awarded a Distinguished Unit Citation for its actions in an attack on Gotha, Germany in February 1944. Following V-E Day, the squadron returned to the United States and was inactivated. It was again active between September 1947 and November 1949 in the reserve, but does not appear to have been fully manned or equipped with tactical aircraft at this time.

The squadron was redesignated the 576th Strategic Missile Squadron and activated with early model SM-65 Atlas missiles in April 1958. It continued to operate the Atlas until it was phased out and the squadron was inactivated in April 1966.

The squadron was activated in the missile test role in September 1991 as the 576th Test Squadron. It changed to its current designation in 1994, without a change in function.

== Mission ==
The squadron is America's only dedicated intercontinental ballistic missile (ICBM) test squadron executing tests that measure the current and future capability of the ICBM force. In executing the ICBM initial operational test and evaluation and force development evaluation programs, the squadron prepares for and conducts ground and flight tests to collect, analyze, and report performance, accuracy, and reliability data for the Joint Staff, United States Strategic Command, the Air Staff and Air Force Global Strike Command. The squadron identifies missile system requirements, demonstrates current and future missile war fighting capabilities and validates missile system improvements and upgrades.

== History ==
=== World War II ===
==== Organization and training ====
The squadron was first activated at Davis-Monthan Field, Arizona, on 26 January 1943 as the 576th Bombardment Squadron, one of the four original squadrons of the 392d Bombardment Group. The squadron was equipped with Consolidated B-24 Liberators, completing its training in July. Its ground echelon departed its last training base, Alamogordo Army Air Field, New Mexico on 18 July for the New York Port of Embarkation, sailing on 25 July for the United Kingdom, while the air echelon ferried their Liberators across the Atlantic.

==== Combat in the European Theater ====
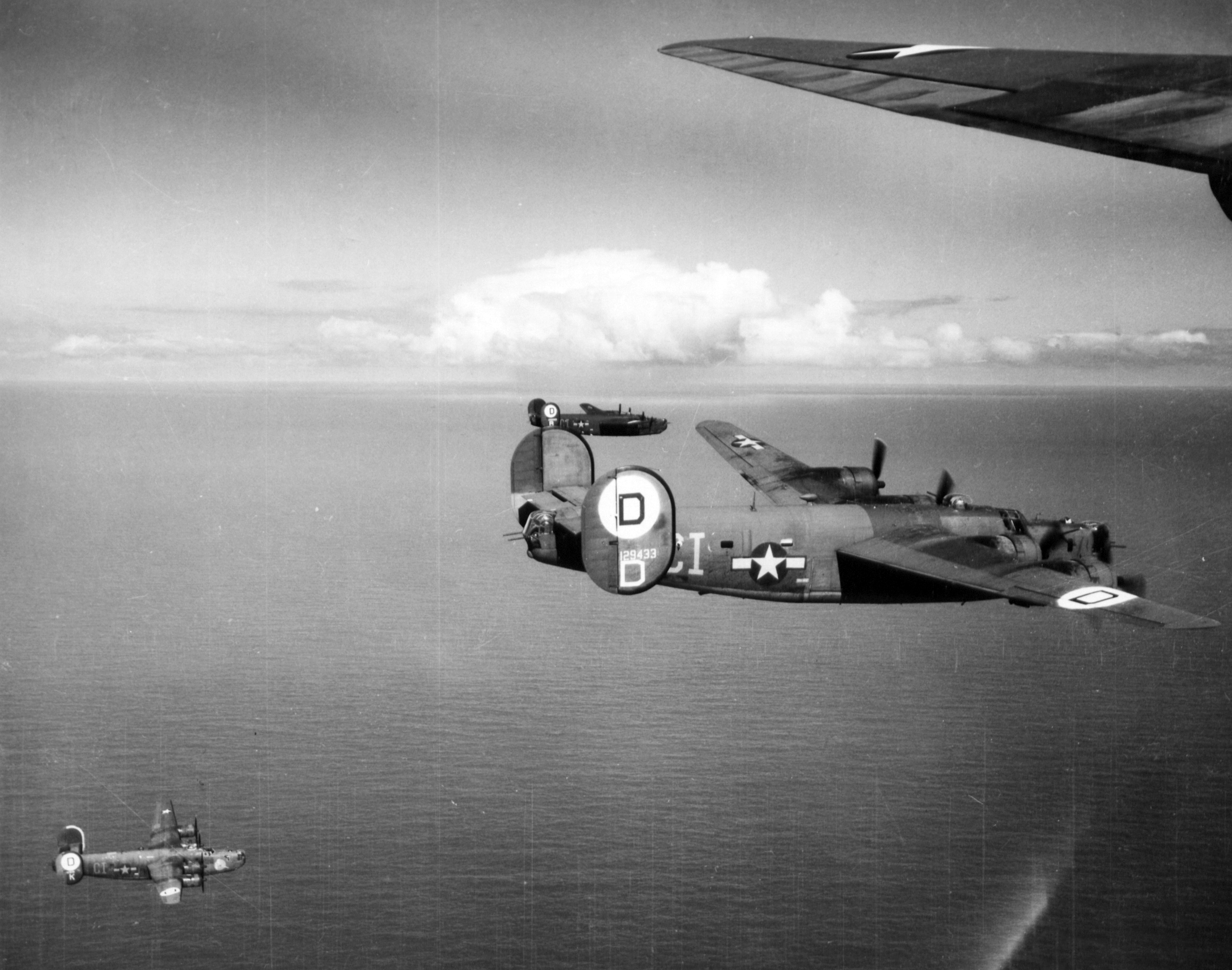
576th Bomb Squadron B-24H Liberator (Note: Aircraft is Consolidated B-24H-15-CF Liberator, serial 41-29433. This plane crash landed in England on 29 May 1944. Baugher, Joe (18 April 2023). "1941 USAF Serial Numbers". Joe Baugher.)

The ground echelon arrived in the United Kingdom on 30 July and arrived at RAF Wendling, the squadron's combat station, the following day. The air echelon had arrived at the station by 15 August. The squadron flew its first combat mission on 9 September. Most of the established B-24 units of VIII Bomber Command were deployed to reinforce efforts in the Mediterranean Theater of Operations when the squadron began operations, and during September and until the other Liberator units returned in early October, the squadron was primarily involved in flying decoy missions near the North Sea, while the command's main raids were being conducted by its Boeing B-17 Flying Fortresses. Until April 1945, the squadron was primarily engaged in the strategic bombing campaign against Germany. Strategic targets included an oil refinery at Geilenkirchen, a marshalling yard at Osnabrück, a railway viaduct at Bielefeld, steel plants at Braunschweig an armored vehicle factory at Kassel and gas works at Berlin.

The squadron participated in the heavy attacks against the German aircraft manufacturing industry during Big Week in late February 1944. During this campaign it earned a Distinguished Unit Citation for an attack on a component manufacturing plant for the Messerschmitt Me 210 at Gotha. The squadron formed part of the group leading the second wing in the attack. It began to experience heavy fighter opposition soon after crossing the coast in the Netherlands. Although the trailing elements of the first wing to attack had missed the target when a wounded lead bombardier collapsed and inadvertently toggled the plane's bombs, the 392d Group did not follow that formation, but attacked the Gotha factory with an extremely accurate bomb run with 98% of its bombs falling within 2000 feet of the aiming point. Despite losses, the plant was put out of commission for an estimated six to seven weeks.

The squadron was sometimes diverted from its strategic mission to perform air support and interdiction missions. In preparing for Operation Overlord, the invasion of Normandy, it participated in Operation Crossbow, attacking V-1 flying bomb and V-2 rocket launching sites, and airfields. On D-Day, it struck coastal defenses and choke points. It struck enemy positions opposing Operation Cobra, the breakout at Saint Lo in July 1944. During the Battle of the Bulge in December 1944 and January 1945, it bombed railroads, bridges and highways to break German lines of communication. It supported airborne attacks by dropping supplies, both near Arnhem in the Netherlands for Operation Market Garden in September 1944 and during Operation Varsity, the airborne assault across the Rhine in March 1945.

==== Return to the United States and inactivation ====
The squadron flew its last combat mission on 25 April 1945. Flooding in areas of the Netherlands not occupied by the Allies had reduced the Dutch population to near starvation. During the first week of May, the squadron flew missions dropping food for the population. The first squadron Liberators departed for the United States on 29 May 1945. Ground personnel sailed on the RMS Queen Mary on 15 June, arriving at the New York Port of Embarkation on 20 June. After leave, the squadron reassembled at Charleston Army Air Field, South Carolina, to perform airlift duties, but apparently was not fully manned or equipped before inactivating on 13 September 1945.

=== Reserve operations ===
The squadron was reactivated at Barksdale Field, Louisiana on 24 September 1947 as a very heavy bombardment squadron. Its training was supervised by Air Defense Command (ADC)'s 174th AAF Base Unit (later the 2509th Air Force Reserve Training Center). In 1948 Continental Air Command assumed responsibility for managing reserve and Air National Guard units from ADC. The May 1949 Air Force Reserve program called for a new type of unit, the Corollary unit, which was a reserve unit integrated with an active duty unit. The plan called for corollary units at 107 locations and was viewed as the best method to train reservists by mixing them with an existing regular unit to perform duties alongside the regular unit. The unit was redesignated as a light bomber unit to become a corollary of the 47th Bombardment Wing in June 1949. However, President Truman’s reduced 1949 defense budget also required reductions in the number of units in the Air Force, and the 47th was inactivated in October. The squadron was inactivated the following month.

=== Intercontinental ballistic missile operations ===
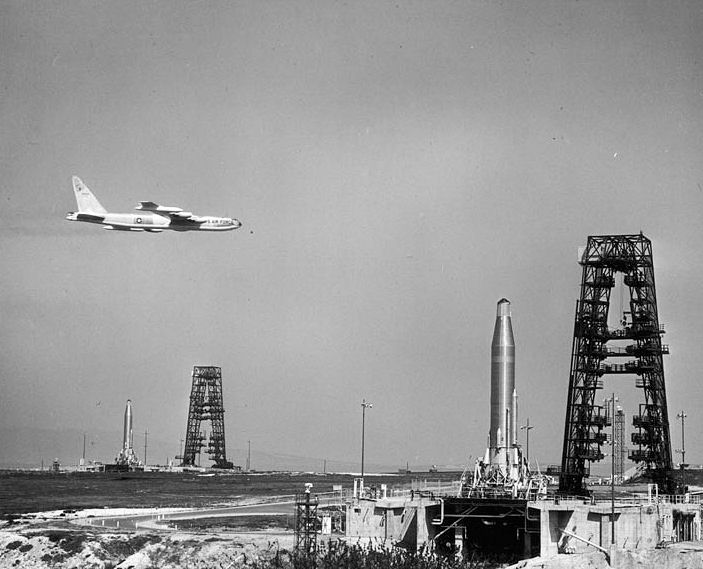
Atlas missiles on alert at Vandenberg Air Force Base, 1960

The squadron was redesignated the 576th Strategic Missile Squadron and activated on 1 April 1958 at Cooke Air Force Base, where it was assigned to the 704th Strategic Missile Wing. The squadron was initially equipped with the SM-65D Atlas. It was the first Atlas squadron and Strategic Air Command (SAC)'s first intercontinental ballistic missile (ICBM) squadron. It initially had two missile complexes, designated 576A and 576B, assigned, each with its own launch control center. Site 576A had three missiles on gantries, similar to those used in testing at Cape Canaveral Air Force Station, Florida, while 576B's three missiles were housed in above ground "coffins." These missiles were stored horizontally in a blast resistant shelter. The protective roof had to be retracted and the missile erected to a vertical position before it could be launched. The SM-65D was the first operational Atlas, with more powerful engines and improved ground radio/inertial guidance than earlier test models. The squadron later added Site 576C with one buried coffin launcher with an SM-65E and two sites, 576D and 576E, each with one SM-65F in a hardened silo. The missiles could not be launched from inside the silo, but had to be lifted along with the launcher to the top of the silo for launch. The E and F models incorporated all inertial guidance, along with improved engines, survivability, and reentry vehicles.

On 16 October 1958, the Air Force accepted the first Atlas launcher (Site 576A-1) from the contractor. On 18 February 1959, the squadron accepted its first Atlas missile. On 1 July, the 704th Wing was inactivated and the squadron was assigned directly to the 1st Missile Division. The squadron became the first SAC unit to place an ICBM on alert, when it placed one of its Atlas D missiles on alert at site 576A-1 on 31 October 1959 at what was now Vandenberg Air Force Base. The squadron also performed testing of the Atlas. On 22 April 1960, it performed the first successful launch of an Atlas D from a coffin (Site 576B-2).

During the Cuban Missile Crisis, on 20 October 1962, SAC directed that all degraded missile alert sorties be returned to full alert status. The SAC/Air Force Systems Command (AFSC) Agreement for Emergency Combat Capability was invoked. AFSC took immediate measures to turn over its Atlas E and Atlas F missiles at Vandenberg to SAC and two missiles were transferred to the squadron's control. By 15 November, the Atlas missiles had been returned to AFSC. The squadron took its first Atlas D missiles off alert on 1 May 1964. After Secretary of Defense Robert S. McNamara directed the acceleration of withdrawing Atlas missiles from service, the last D model was off alert by October, the last E model by March 1965, and the last F model by April 1965. On 2 April 1966, the squadron was inactivated.

=== Intercontinental ballistic missile testing ===
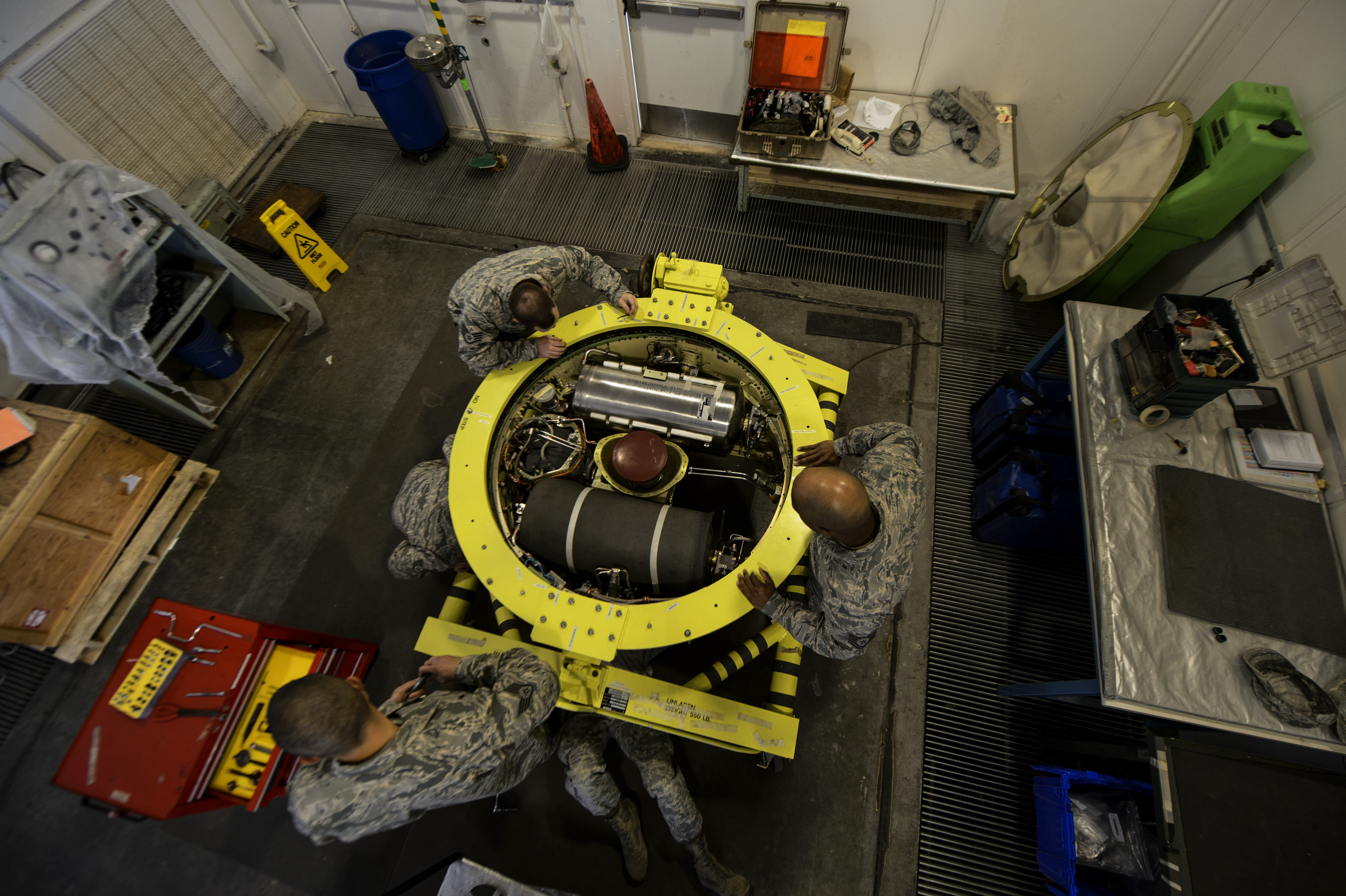
Technicians from the 576th work on a Minuteman III component at Vandenberg AFB 3 February 2014 (Note: The Minuteman III is regularly tested with launches from Vandenberg in order to validate the effectiveness, readiness and accuracy of the weapon system, as well as to support the system's primary purpose - nuclear deterrence. U.S. Air Force photo by SSG Jonathan Snyder.)

The squadron was redesignated the 576th Test Squadron and activated on 1 September 1991 as part of the 310th Training and Test Wing at Vandenberg Air Force Base. When SAC was disestablished on 1 July 1992, the 310th Wing transferred to Air Force Space Command. One year later, the 310th inactivated and the squadron was reassigned and became an element of the 30th Space Wing. One year after that, the squadron became the 576th Flight Test Squadron and on 22 February 1996, the squadron was reassigned to the Space Warfare Center, located at Schriever Air Force Base, Colorado. The following month, the 30th Maintenance Squadron and portions of the 30th Logistics Support Squadron merged into the 576th. This merger aligned all personnel directly involved with ICBM testing at Vandenberg under one commander.

On 1 December 2009 the 576th was reassigned, along with the Air Force's ICBM mission, to Air Force Global Strike Command (AFGSC), reporting to the command director of operations. Although it was reassigned to Twentieth Air Force on 1 October 2016, the director retained operational and functional oversight of the unit. In November 2022, AFGSC formed the 377th Test and Evaluation Group and assigned the 576th to it. The group also includes two new support squadrons to prepare for the development of the LGM-35 Sentinel system.

== Lineage ==
- Constituted as the 576th Bombardment Squadron (Heavy) on 15 January 1943

Activated on 26 January 1943
Redesignated 576th Bombardment Squadron, Heavy on 20 August 1943
Inactivated on 13 September 1945

- Redesignated 576th Bombardment Squadron, Very Heavy on 5 September 1947

Activated in the reserve on 24 September 1947
Redesignated 576th Bombardment Squadron, Light, Jet on 27 June 1949
Inactivated on 10 November 1949

- Redesignated 576th Strategic Missile Squadron (ICBM-Atlas) on 6 March 1958

Activated on 1 April 1958
Discontinued and inactivated on 2 April 1966

- Redesignated 576th Test Squadron on 29 August 1991

Activated on 1 September 1991
Redesignated 576th Flight Test Squadron on 1 July 1994

=== Assignments ===
- 392d Bombardment Group, 26 January 1943 – 13 September 1945
- 392d Bombardment Group, 24 September 1947 – 10 November 1949
- 704th Strategic Missile Wing, 1 April 1958
- 1st Missile Division (later 1st Strategic Aerospace Division), 1 July 1959
- 392d Strategic Missile Wing, 18 October 1961
- 1st Strategic Aerospace Division, 20 December 1961 – 2 April 1966
- 310th Operations Group, 1 September 1991
- 30th Operations Group, 1 July 1993
- Space Warfare Center, 22 February 1996
- 595th Test and Evaluation Group (later 595 Space Group), 1 August 2002
- Air Force Global Strike Command, 1 December 2009
- Twentieth Air Force 1 October 2016
- 377th Test and Evaluation Group, 2 November 2022 – present

=== Stations ===
- Davis-Monthan Field, Arizona, 26 January 1943
- Biggs Field, Texas, 1 March 1943
- Alamogordo Army Air Field, New Mexico, 18 April – 18 July 1943
- RAF Wendling (Station 118), England, 31 July 1943 – c. 9 June 1945
- Charleston Army Air Field, South Carolina, 25 June – 13 September 1945
- Barksdale Field (later Barksdale Air Force Base), Louisiana, 24 September 1947 – 10 November 1949.
- Cooke Air Force Base (later Vandenberg Air Force Base), California, 1 April 1958 – 2 April 1966
- Vandenberg Air Force Base (later Vandenberg Space Force Base), California, 1 September 1991 – present

=== Aircraft and missiles ===
- Consolidated B-24 Liberator, 1943–1945
- SM-65 Atlas Missile, 1958–1966
- Tested LGM-118 Peacekeeper, 1991–2004
- Tested LGM-30G Minuteman III, 1991–present

=== Awards and campaigns ===
Award streamer	Award	Dates	Notes
	Distinguished Unit Citation	24 February 1944	576th Bombardment Squadron Gotha, Germany
	Air Force Outstanding Unit Award	1 July 1962 – 30 June 1964	576th Strategic Missile Squadron
	Air Force Outstanding Unit Award	1 September 1991 – 15 May 1993	576th Test Squadron
	Air Force Outstanding Unit Award	1 November 1991 – 30 September 1993	576th Test Squadron
	Air Force Outstanding Unit Award	1 October 1996 – 30 September 1997	576th Flight Test Squadron
	Air Force Outstanding Unit Award	1 September 2004 – 31 August 2005	576th Flight Test Squadron
	Air Force Outstanding Unit Award	1 September 2005 – 31 August 2006	576th Flight Test Squadron
	Air Force Outstanding Unit Award	1 September 2006 – 31 August 2007	576th Flight Test Squadron
	Air Force Organizational Excellence Award	1 August 1999 – 31 July 2001	576th Flight Test Squadron
	Air Force Organizational Excellence Award	1 September 2002 – 1 September 2003	576th Flight Test Squadron

Campaign Streamer	Campaign	Dates	Notes
	Air Offensive, Europe	31 July 1943 – 5 June 1944	576th Bombardment Squadron
	Air Combat, EAME Theater	31 July 1943 – 11 May 1945	576th Bombardment Squadron
	Normandy	6 June 1944 – 24 July 1944	576th Bombardment Squadron
	Northern France	25 July 1944 – 14 September 1944	576th Bombardment Squadron
	Rhineland	15 September 1944 – 21 March 1945	576th Bombardment Squadron
	Ardennes-Alsace	16 December 1944 – 25 January 1945	576th Bombardment Squadron
	Central Europe	22 March 1944 – 21 May 1945	576th Bombardment Squadron

Missile sites

== Missile sites ==
The squadron Operated five live missile sites and two test sites as listed below:

- 576-A, 5.6 mi SW of Casmalia CA,

- 576-A1 34.7769°N 120.6019°W

- Also known as 4300 A-1 / Advanced Ballistic Re-entry System (ABRES) A-1 / Ballistic Missile Re-entry System (BMRS) A-1
- Design capacity: 1xSM-65D
- Test launches: 18xSM-65D (1959–66), 16xSM-65F (1967–76), 1xSM-65E (1968), 1xSM-65-Burner-2 (1972)

- 576-A2 34.7808°N 120.6002°W

- Also known as 4300 A-2 / BMRS A-2
- Design capacity: 1xSM-65D
- Test launches: 1xSM-65D (1959), 13xSM-65F (1965–71)

- 576-A3 34.7775°N 120.5970°W

- Also known as 4300 A-3 / BMRS A-3
- Design capacity: 1xSM-65D
- Test launches: 10xSM-65D (1960–75), 21xSM-65F (1965–74), 2xSM-65E (1968)

- 576-B, 4.7 mi SW of Casmalia CA,

- 576-B1 34.7932°N 120.5952°W

- Also known as ABRES B-1
- Design capacity: 1xSM-65D
- Test launches: 13xSM-65D (1960–66)

- 576-B2 34.7912°N 120.5918°W

- Also known as ABRES B-2
- Design capacity: 1xSM-65D
- Test launches: 26xSM-65D (1960–67)

- 576-B3 34.7932°N 120.5952°W

- Also known as ABRES B-3
- Design capacity: 1xSM-65D
- Test launches: 23xSM-65D (1960–67)

- 576-C, 3.6 mi WSW of Casmalia CA, 34.8088°N 120.5838°W

- Design capacity: 1xSM-65E
- Test launches: 3xSM-65E (Jul–Sep 1963)

- 576-D, 1.9 mi SW of Casmalia CA, 34.8205°N 120.5571°W

- Design capacity: 1xSM-65F
- Test launches: 2xSM-65F (1963–64)

- 576-E, 8.4 mi SW of Casmalia CA, 34.7396°N 120.6191°W

- Design capacity: 1xSM-65F / 1xTaurus (1110, 2110, 3110, 3210) / 1xTaurus Lite
- Test launches: 4xSM-65F (1962–64), 10xTaurus (1994–2011)

- 576-F, 4.3 miles SW of Casmalia CA, 34.7961°N 120.5890°W

- Also known as SM-65E Operational System Test Facility (65-OSTF-1)
- Design capacity: 1xSM-65E
- Test launches: 2xSM-65E (Feb–Aug 1964)

- 576-G, 1.9 miles SW of Casmalia CA, 34.8225°N 120.5617°W

- Also known as SM-65F 65-OSTF-2
- Design capacity: 1xSM-65F
- Test launches: 2xSM-65F (1964–65)

== See also ==
- List of United States Air Force missile squadrons
