= RAF Wendling =

Royal Air Force station in England, 1942–1964

RAF Wendling USAAF Station 118
- East Dereham, Norfolk in England
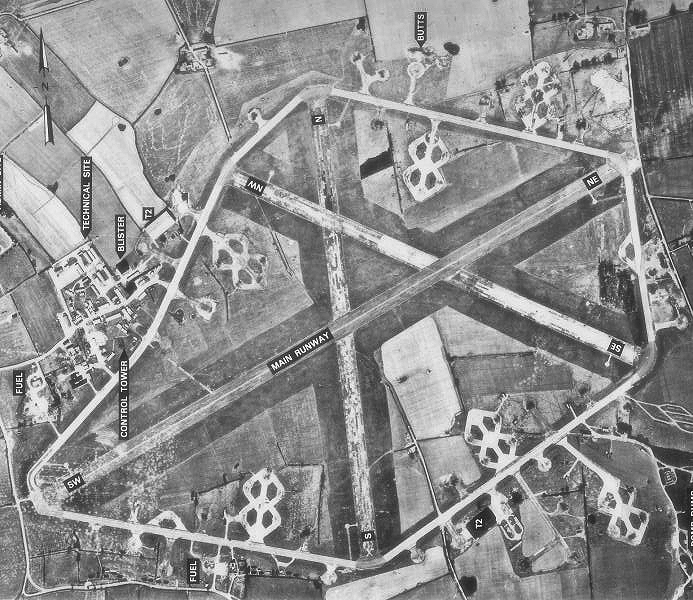

Site information
- Type: Royal Air Force station
- Code: WU
- Owner: Air Ministry
- Operator: Royal Air Force; United States Army Air Forces
- Controlled by: Eighth Air Force; RAF Maintenance Command

Location
- Coordinates: 52.70°N 0.84°E

Site history
- Built: 1942
- In use: 1943-1961
- Battles/wars: European Theatre of World War II; Air Offensive, Europe July 1942 – May 1945

Garrison information
- Garrison: 392d Bombardment Group

Airfield information
Runways
Direction	Length and surface
00/00	1,800 metres (5,906 ft) Concrete
00/00	1,300 metres (4,265 ft) Concrete
00/00	1,300 metres (4,265 ft) Concrete

Royal Air Force Wendling or RAF Wendling is a former Royal Air Force station located 5 miles (8 km) west-northwest of East Dereham, Norfolk, England.

Opened in 1942, it was used during the war by the 392nd Bombardment Group of the United States Army Air Forces, Eighth Air Force, flying Consolidated B-24 Liberator bombers.

After the war, it was maintained by the RAF as a standby airfield until their departure in 1961. A small USAF radio detachment remained until 1964, when the land was sold off and returned to agriculture, with turkey sheds built on parts of the old runways.

== History ==
RAF Wendling was originally planned for RAF Bomber Command use, however in 1942 was assigned as a United States Army Air Forces heavy bomber installation. It was the most northerly placed of Eighth Air Force heavy bomber fields and was built by Taylor-Woodrow Ltd in 1942. The airfield featured a 6,000-foot (1,800 m) long main runway angled on a NE-SW axis and two intersecting 4,200 feet (1,300 m) long secondary runways, all within a perimeter track and constructed of reinforced concrete.

Another twenty hardstands (loop type) were added to the thirty of the frying-pan type when the airfield was rescheduled as an Eighth Air Force heavy bomber station. Two T2-type hangars were provided plus the usual full technical facilities, Mark II airfield lighting and dispersed accommodation for some 2,900 persons. The domestic sites were in the parish of Beeston to the west of the airfield and the bomb dump and ammunition stores were in Honeypot Wood to the south-east.

=== United States Army Air Forces use ===
Under USAAF control, RAF Wendling was designated as Station 118.

==== 392nd Bombardment Group (Heavy) ====
The airfield was opened in 1943 and was used by the 392d Bombardment Group (Heavy), arriving from Alamogordo Army Airfield, New Mexico in the south west of the US, on 18 July 1943. The 453rd was assigned to the 14th Combat Bombardment Wing, and the group tail code was a "Circle-D".

Its operational squadrons were:

- 576th Bombardment Squadron (CI).
- 577th Bombardment Squadron (DC).
- 578th Bombardment Squadron (EC).
- 579th Bombardment Squadron (GC).

The group flew Consolidated B-24 Liberators as part of the Eighth Air Force's strategic bombing campaign.

The 392d BG entered combat on 9 September 1943 and engaged primarily in bombardment of strategic objectives on the Continent until April 1945. The group attacked such targets as an oil refinery at Gelsenkirchen, a marshalling yard at Osnabrück, a railroad viaduct at Bielefeld, steel plants at Brunswick, a tank factory at Kassel, and gas works at Berlin.

The group took part in the intensive campaign of heavy bombers against the German aircraft industry during Big Week, 20 – 25 February 1944, being awarded a Distinguished Unit Citation (DUC) for bombing an aircraft and component parts factory at Gotha on 24 February. The unit sometimes supported ground forces or carried out interdictory operations along with bombing airfields and V-weapon sites in France prior to the Normandy invasion in June 1944 and struck coastal defences and choke points on D-Day.

The group hit enemy positions to assist ground forces at Saint-Lô during the breakthrough in July 1944. Bombed railroads, bridges, and highways to cut off German supply lines during the Battle of the Bulge, December 1944 – January 1945. Dropped supplies to Allied troops during the air attack on Holland in September 1944 and during the airborne assault across the Rhine in March 1945.

The 392nd Bomb Group flew its last combat mission on 25 April 1945, then carried food to the Dutch. The unit returned to Charleston Army Airfield South Carolina, in the north east of the USA on 25 June 1945 and was inactivated on 13 September 1945.

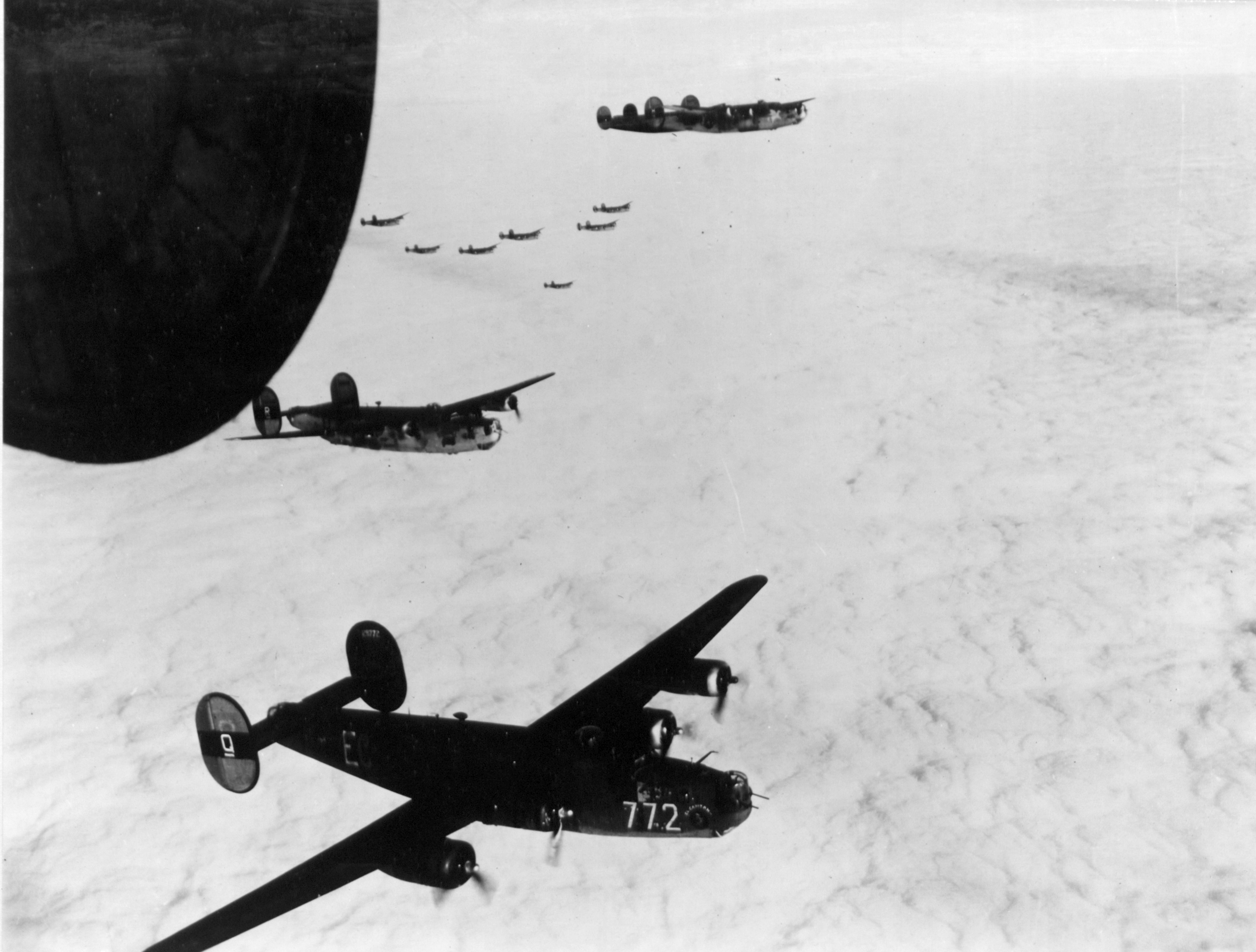
Consolidated B-24 Liberators of the 392d Bomb Group on a mission over enemy-occupied territory

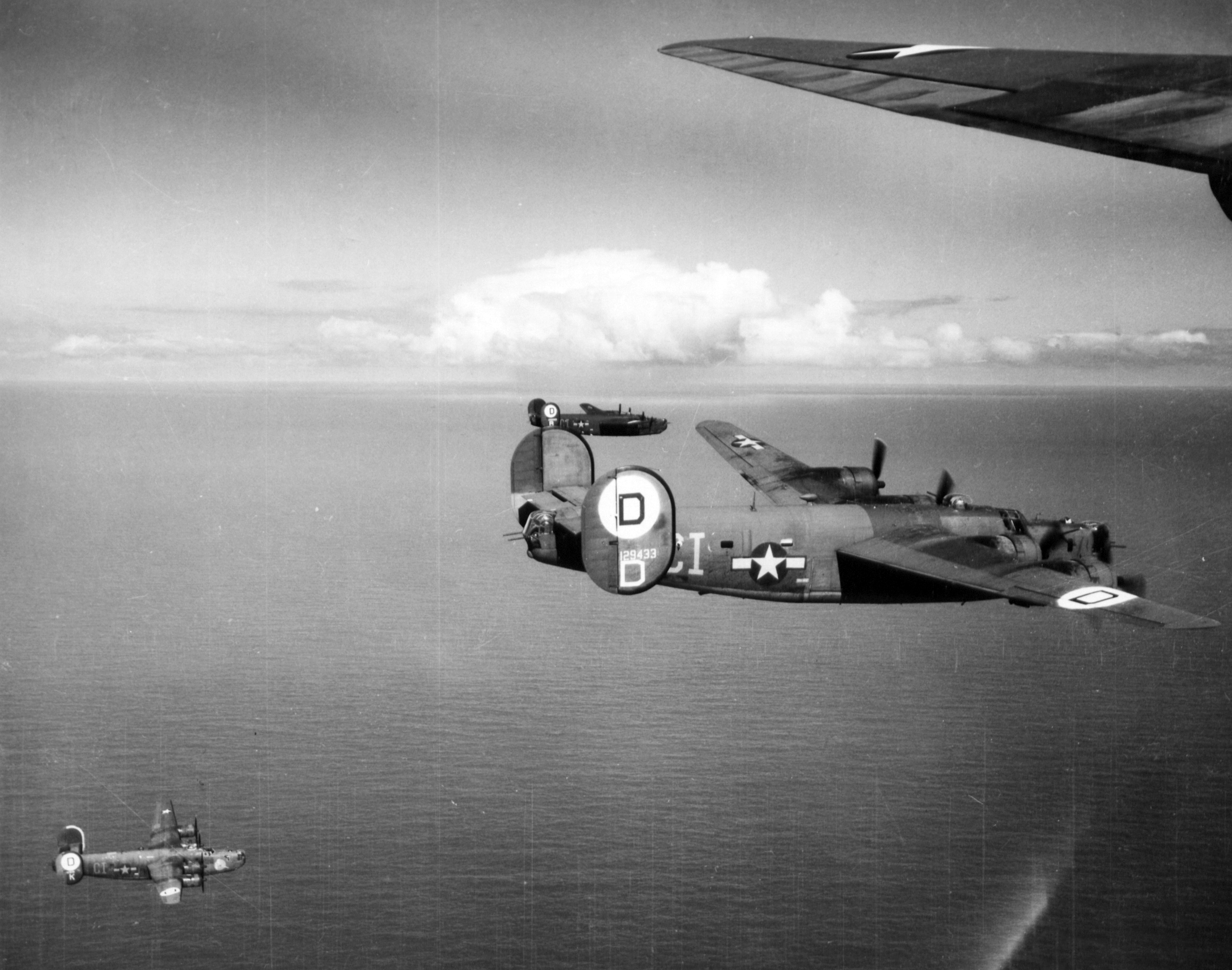
Consolidated B-24H-15-CF Liberator Serial 41-29433 of the 576th Bomb Squadron on a mission over enemy-occupied territory. This aircraft crash-landed 29 May 1944 at Sporle, near Little Fransham in Norfolk, England.

=== Royal Air Force use ===
When the Americans left, Wendling RAF was returned to the Air Ministry and transferred to RAF Maintenance Command and was used by No. 258 Maintenance Unit RAF as a stand-by airfield, later becoming an inactive station before being finally closed on 22 November 1961. The airfield was also home to No. 4249 Anti-Aircraft Flight RAF Regiment.

It was used between June 1960 and April 1964 by the United States Air Force as a radio facility before being finally closed and sold in 1964.

== Post military use ==
With the end of military control the airfield has become a turkey farm, with large coops built along its runways. Most of the buildings and hardstands have been demolished and the concrete removed. Also much of the perimeter track has been reduced to a single lane road.

A granite obelisk monument to the men of the 392nd Bomb Group and stands in a small plot just off the airfield on the road to Beeston. The monument was dedicated in September 1945.

== See also ==
- List of former Royal Air Force stations
