= 307th Air Division =

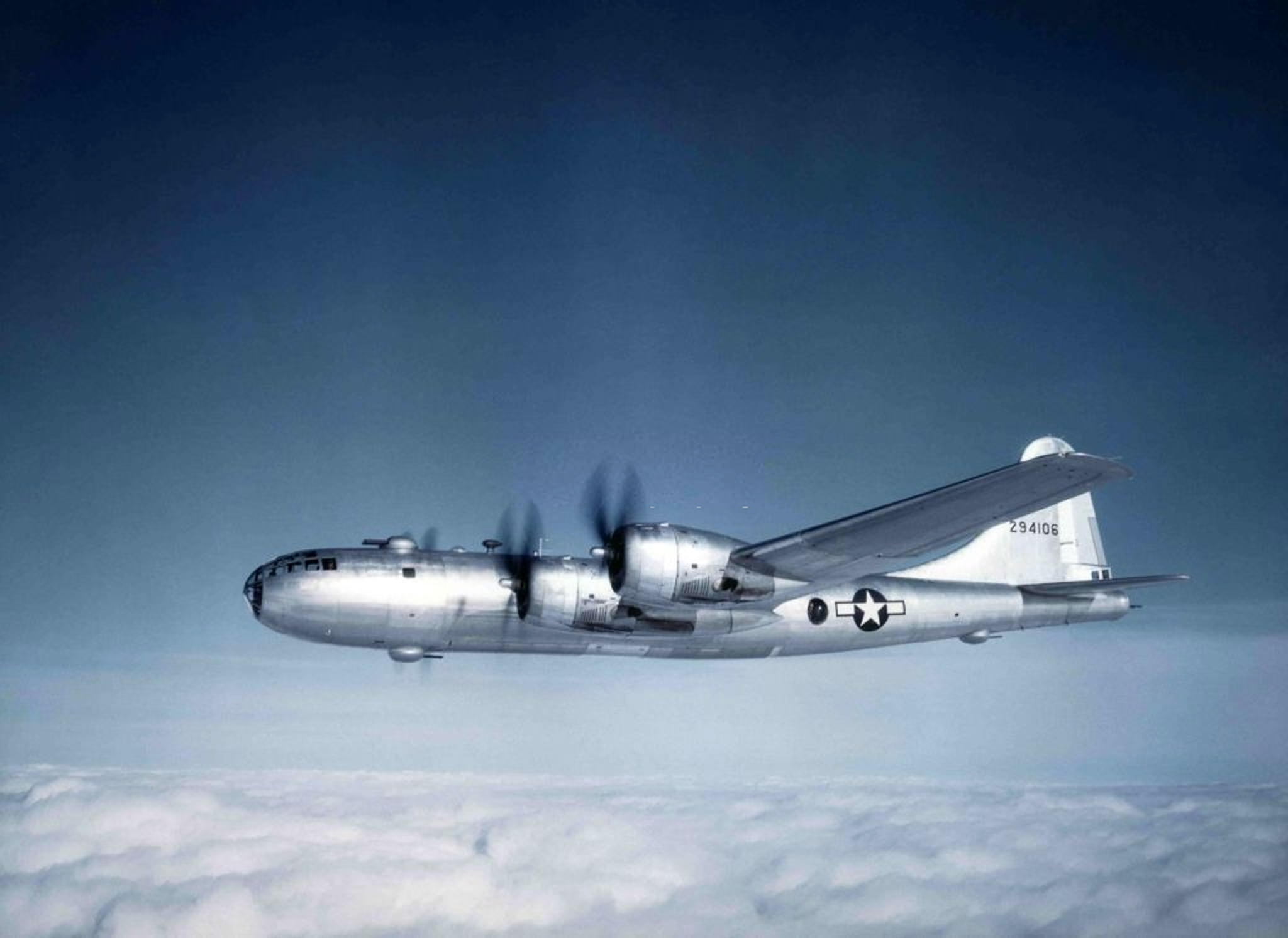
- B-29 Superfortress, authorized for division in the reserve
- Active: 1943–1944; 1947–1949
- Country: United States
- Branch: United States Air Force
- Role: Command of bombardment units
- Engagements: Mediterranean Theater of Operations

The 307th Air Division is an inactive United States Air Force organization. Its last assignment was with Twelfth Air Force at New Orleans Municipal Airport, Louisiana, where it was inactivated on 27 June 1949.

The division was active briefly in Italy during World War II as the 307th Bombardment Wing but its personnel were used to man other units and it was disbanded a few months after its activation. The unit was reactivated in 1947 to command reserve heavy bomber units.

== History ==
=== World War II ===
The division was first activated at Bari, Italy in January 1944 as the 307th Bombardment Wing. The 307th had no subordinate units assigned but like its counterpart 305th Bombardment Wing, served as a source of personnel for Headquarters, Fifteenth Air Force. The wing was disestablished only six months later on 15 June 1944.

=== Air Force reserve ===
The wing was reactivated as a reserve unit under Air Defense Command (ADC) in March 1947 at New Orleans Municipal Airport, Louisiana. It was assigned no groups until June, when the 482d Bombardment Group was assigned to the wing. At the end of July, the 392d Bombardment Group was activated at Barksdale Field and assigned to the wing. The groups were designated as very heavy units and were nominally Boeing B-29 Superfortress units. However, there is no indication that the 482d Group was equipped with tactical aircraft. The 392d Group was located at a regular Air Force base, which gave it access to aircraft stationed there.

In 1948, Continental Air Command assumed responsibility from ADC for managing Air National Guard and reserve units. When the regular Air Force implemented the wing base organization system, which placed operational and support units on a base under a single wing that same year, the 307th Wing, along with other reserve wings with more than one combat group assigned, was renamed an air division. In the case of the 307th, this also prevented confusion with the regular 307th Bombardment Wing, which was organized at MacDill Air Force Base, Florida in August 1947.

The 307th participated in routine reserve training and supervised the training of its assigned groups until it was inactivated, in part due to President Truman’s 1949 defense budget, which required reductions in the number of units in the Air Force. With the inactivation of the division and the 482d Group, reserve flying operations at New Orleans Municipal Airport came to an end. (Note: Later reserve flying operations in the area were located at Naval Air Station New Orleans.)

== Lineage ==
- Established as the 307th Bombardment Wing (Heavy) on 7 December 1943

Activated on 15 January 1944
Disestablished on 15 June 1944

- Reestablished and redesignated 307th Bombardment Wing, Very Heavy on 10 February 1947

Activated in the Reserve on 31 March 1947
Redesignated 307th Air Division, Bombardment on 16 April 1948
Inactivated on 27 June 1949

=== Assignments ===
- Fifteenth Air Force, 15 January – 15 June 1944
- Tenth Air Force, 31 March 1947
- Fourteenth Air Force, 1 July 1948
- Twelfth Air Force, 12 January – 27 June 1949

=== Stations ===
- Bari, Italy, 15 January – 15 June 1944
- New Orleans Municipal Airport, Louisiana, 31 March 1947 – 27 June 1949

=== Components ===
Groups

- 392d Bombardment Group: 30 July 1947 – 27 June 1949

Barksdale Field (later Barksdale Air Force Base), Louisiana

- 482d Bombardment Group: 26 June 1947 – 27 June 1949

=== Aircraft ===
- Boeing B-29 Superfortress, 1947–1949

=== Campaigns ===
Campaign Streamer	Campaign	Dates	Notes
	Naples-Foggia	15–21 January 1944	307th Bombardment Wing
	Rome-Arno	22 January – 15 June 1944	307th Bombardment Wing

== See also ==
- List of United States Air Force air divisions
- List of B-29 Superfortress operators
