= Harmon =

Harmon may refer to:

== Places ==
=== Canada ===
- Ernest Harmon Air Force Base, also known as Harmon, a former United States military installation
- Harmon Links, a golf course in Stephenville, Newfoundland

=== United States ===
- Harmon, Illinois
- Harmon township, Sumner County, Kansas
- Harmon, Louisiana
- Harmon, Oklahoma
- Harmon, Wisconsin, a ghost town
- Harmon Air Force Base, former United States Air Forces base in Guam
- Harmon County, Oklahoma
- Harmon Industrial Park, an area of Tamuning, Guam
- Croton-Harmon (Metro-North station), in New York

== People ==
- Harmon (name), people named Harmon
- Harmon, name of minor Greek mythological characters

== Arts, entertainment, and media ==
- HarmonQuest, an animated series by Dan Harmon
- Harmontown, a weekly comedy show and podcast by Dan Harmon
- Harmon, a brand of trumpet mute
- Harmon, a fictional town in the film Accepted (film)
- Beth Harmon, protagonist of novel, and Netflix miniseries adaptation The Queen's Gambit

== Aviation ==
- Harmon Der Donnerschlag, an American homebuilt aircraft design
- Harmon Engineering Company, an American aircraft design firm
- Harmon Mister America, an American homebuilt aircraft design

== Enterprises and organizations ==
- Harmon Face Values an American chain of discount healthcare and beauty supply stores that shut down in 2023.
- Harmon Meadow also known as "The Plaza at Harmon Meadow", a commercial complex in New Jersey
- The Harmon Building, in Las Vegas, Nevada
- William E. Harmon Foundation, a non-profit known for its support and patronage of African-American artists during the first half of the 20th century

== See also ==
- Harman (disambiguation)
- Garmon
