= 1 November 1944 reconnaissance sortie over Japan =

Sortie by US F-13 Superfortress aircraft

- Part of Air raids on Japan, World War II
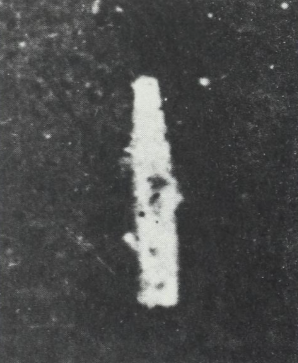
- A photograph of the Japanese aircraft carrier Shinano off Yokosuka that was taken during the sortie on 1 November 1944
Date	1 November 1944
Location	Japan
Result	Successful US photo reconnaissance mission

Belligerents
United States	Japan

Strength
1 F-13 Superfortress	Multiple fighter aircraft Anti-aircraft batteries

Casualties and losses
None	None

On 1 November 1944, a United States Army Air Forces (USAAF) F-13 Superfortress conducted the first flight by an Allied aircraft over the Tokyo region of Japan since the Doolittle Raid in April 1942. This photo reconnaissance sortie returned with 7000 photographs which helped with planning air raids on Japan during the last months of World War II. Attempts by Japanese air units and anti-aircraft gun batteries to shoot down the F-13 failed, as the available fighter aircraft and guns could not reach the high altitude at which it operated.

== Background ==
In late 1944 the United States Twentieth Air Force's XXI Bomber Command prepared to conduct strategic bombing raids on the Japanese home islands from bases in the Mariana Islands. These attacks were to replace the largely unsuccessful Operation Matterhorn raids which had been conducted by XX Bomber Command aircraft based in India and staging through bases in China since June 1944. While XX Bomber Command conducted photo reconnaissance sorties over Japan as part of this effort, the aircraft flying from China lacked the range to reach Japan's main industrial centers. XXI Bomber Command needed aerial photos to develop plans for its air raids.

On 10 October 1944 the Committee of Operations Analysts, which provided advice to USAAF commanders on suitable strategic bombardment targets, recommended that photo reconnaissance flights be conducted over Japan's main industrial areas as soon as possible to provide intelligence which could be used to direct raids from the Mariana Islands. These operations were to be conducted by the 3rd Photographic Reconnaissance Squadron (3rd PRS), which was the only photo reconnaissance unit in the XXI Bomber Command.

The 3rd PRS had been formed on 10 June 1941. After conducting flights over the Americas, it was deployed to the China-Burma-India Theater. The unit flew mapping missions over the region from 10 December 1943 until it was disbanded and re-formed in the United States during April 1944 to be equipped with the new F-13 photo reconnaissance variant of the Boeing B-29 Superfortress heavy bomber. Due to delays to the development of the F-13, the 3rd PRS was unable to commence training on the type until 24 August, and began to receive its first operational F-13s on 4 October. 3rd PRS F-13s began to depart for Saipan in the Mariana Islands on 19 October, where they would be supported by the unit's ground echelon which had arrived on 18 September.

== Photo reconnaissance sortie ==
The first two 3rd PRS F-13s arrived at Saipan on 30 October after a 33-hour flight from Mather Field in California via Oahu and Kwajalein. The commander of the XXI Bomber Command, Brigadier General Haywood S. Hansell, encouraged the exhausted airmen to rest. However, they insisted on making a flight over Japan as soon as possible.

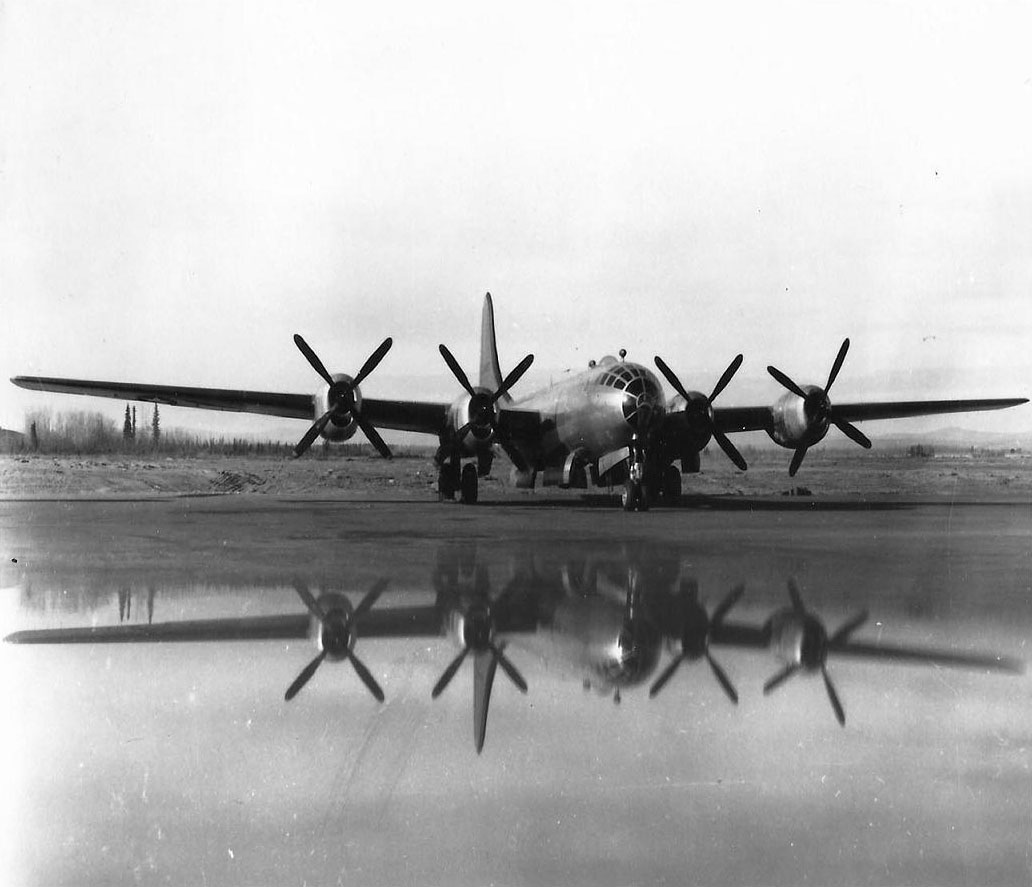
An F-13 Superfortress similar to the aircraft involved in the 1 November 1944 sortie

At 5:55 am on 1 November an F-13 whose crew was led by Captain Ralph D. Steakley took off from Saipan bound for Japan. Weather conditions over Tokyo were perfect for photo reconnaissance, with the skies free of clouds. Flying at 32,000 feet (9,800 m), Steakley's aircraft repeatedly passed over a complex of aircraft and engine plants to the west of Tokyo, before moving on to photograph a similar facility near the city of Nagoya. Overall, the American airmen took 7,000 photos during the mission. While most of the photos of Tokyo were of industrial areas, the aircraft also photographed the densely populated urban areas of the city which were firebombed later in the war. Steakley was surprised to encounter strong winds, and reported that his ground speed over Tokyo was sometimes only about 70 miles per hour (110 km/h). The jet stream over this region was not known to the USAAF at the time, and greatly complicated XXI Bomber Command's later air raids.

The Imperial Japanese Army Air Service's 47th Sentai provided fighter cover for Tokyo on 1 November. (Note: Sentais were air groups with several flying squadrons.) The unit's Nakajima Ki-44 fighters began to take off from Narimasu airfield to intercept the F-13 at 1:00 pm. These aircraft were not designed to be used at high altitudes, and the Japanese airmen were unable to get closer than about 3,000 feet (1,000 m) from Steakley's aircraft. Two formations of fighters fired machine guns at the F-13, but did not hit it. Several batteries of Japanese anti-aircraft guns also unsuccessfully fired on the American aircraft. The F-13 was the first American aircraft to fly over Tokyo since the Doolittle Raid in April 1942, and was seen by many Japanese civilians. Its presence over the city and the failure of the military to shoot it down increased the concerns many had over the course of the war.

== Aftermath ==
The F-13 returned to Saipan after a 14-hour flight. By the next day the crew had named the aircraft "Tokyo Rose" in reference to the propaganda broadcaster. Steakley received the Distinguished Flying Cross for the flight, and the other members of the crew were also later decorated. It took weeks to process all of the photographs and months to fully analyze them.

The photographs taken during the sortie were an important source of intelligence for the Twentieth Air Force and other American units, especially as 1 November proved to be the only day of the air campaign against Japan in which weather conditions over the home islands were entirely clear of cloud. Hansell later said the sortie had been probably the greatest single contribution to the air war with Japan.

The 3rd PRS flew 16 more sorties over Japan before XXI Bomber Command's first raid against Tokyo on 24 November, but several of these missions were frustrated by bad weather. One F-13 was lost during a mission to Nagoya on 21 November, but the squadron had nine aircraft at Saipan by the end of the month. The 3rd PRS continued to fly reconnaissance sorties over Japan until the end of the war.
