= Air Forces Strategic =

Air Forces Strategic may refer to:

- Eighth Air Force - The numbered air force responsible for the USAF's strategic bombers
- Fourteenth Air Force - The numbered air force formerly responsible for the USAF's space forces
- Twentieth Air Force - The numbered air force responsible for the USAF's strategic missiles
