= United States Strategic Air Forces in the Pacific =

Overall command authority of the U.S. Army Air Forces in the Pacific during World War II

- Active: June - 6 Dec 1945
- Country: United States of America
- Branch: United States Army Air Forces
- Role: Command and Control
- Garrison/HQ: Guam
- Engagements: : World War II; Asiatic-Pacific Campaign (1945)

Commanders
- Notable commanders: General Carl Spaatz

The United States Strategic Air Forces in the Pacific (USSTAF) was a formation of the United States Army Air Forces. It became the overall command and control authority of the United States Army Air Forces in the Pacific theater of World War II.

== History ==
USASTAF was the Pacific counterpart of the United States Strategic Air Forces in Europe (USSTAF). Its mission was to coordinate strategic bombing of the Japanese home islands during the expected invasion of Japan.

=== Establishment ===
The Joint Chiefs agreed to the establishment of the USASTAF on 2 July 1945, it would have a headquarters in Guam and be commanded by General Carl Andrew "Tooey" Spaatz, and consisted of the combat commands (VII Fighter Command, XXI Bomber Command) of the Twentieth Air Force, and the Eighth Air Force when it was redeployed from the European Theater of Operations (ETO) to Okinawa. General Curtis E. Lemay was appointed Spaatz's Chief of Staff.

The island of Guam was the headquarters of the XXI Bomber Command, and until the arrival of the Eighth Air Force, it would house the bulk of men and equipment of the new command. On 16 July the headquarters of the Twentieth Air Force was officially moved from Washington, DC to Harmon Field, Guam; the headquarters of the XX Bomber Command was inactivated, effective 18 July, and the Headquarters and Headquarters Squadron, XXI Bomber Command was redesignated Headquarters and Headquarters Squadron, Twentieth Air Force; thus the Bomber Commands were brought to an end as actual establishments and their wings passed to direct control of Headquarters Twentieth Air Force of which Major General Curtis E. LeMay took command on that date. On the same day the Eighth was reassigned to Okinawa, as a paper transfer as it arrived without men or equipment. Spaatz arrived in theater on 29 July and began organizing his forces—a task he had not completed by the war's end.

The primary combat missions carried out by USASTAF forces were the firebombing of Japanese cities and industrial targets during June and July 1945 by Twentieth Air Force. No Eighth Air Force combat missions were flown. The atomic bombings of Hiroshima and Nagasaki were carried out by direct order of USAAF Chief of Staff General Henry "Hap" Arnold" through the 509th Composite Group.

=== Inactivation ===
On 6 December 1945 USASTAF was abolished by the inactivation of its headquarters and headquarters squadron. Its personnel, equipment and aircraft were assigned to Pacific Air Command, United States Army (PACUSA) which was assigned to United States Army Forces, Pacific (AFPAC).

PACUSA was reassigned to Tokyo, Japan on 17 May 1946. The USAAF Air Forces in the Pacific region were reassigned as follows:

- Fifth Air Force: Assigned to Tokyo, Japan
- Seventh Air Force: Assigned to Hickam Field, Territory of Hawaii
- Eighth Air Force: Assigned to Kadena Army Air Base, Okinawa
- Thirteenth Air Force: Assigned to Clark Field, Philippines
- Twentieth Air Force: Assigned to Harmon Field, Guam, Mariana Islands

There was also the Pacific Air Service Command, later Far East Air Service Command which was attached to HQ PACUSA.

The USAAF Air Forces in the Pacific region had a total of six very-heavy-bombardment groups, nine fighter groups, two light-bombardment groups, and two troop-carrier groups, along with three tactical reconnaissance, five air-sea rescue, five night-fighter, two liaison, two tow-target, and two very-long-range photographic-reconnaissance squadrons. Although by December 1945 most of these units were in the process of being reassigned to the United States or demobilizing in-theater and the personnel returning to processing centers for discharge.

=== Lineage ===
- Established as United States Strategic Air Forces in the Pacific, 2 July 1945

Activated and organized on 16 July 1945
Inactivated on 6 December 1945
Assets reassigned to: Pacific Air Command, United States Army

=== Components ===
- Eighth Air Force, 16 July 1945 – 6 December 1945
- Twentieth Air Force, 16 July 1945 – 6 December 1945

== See also ==
- Curtis LeMay
- Pacific War
