= XXI Bomber Command =

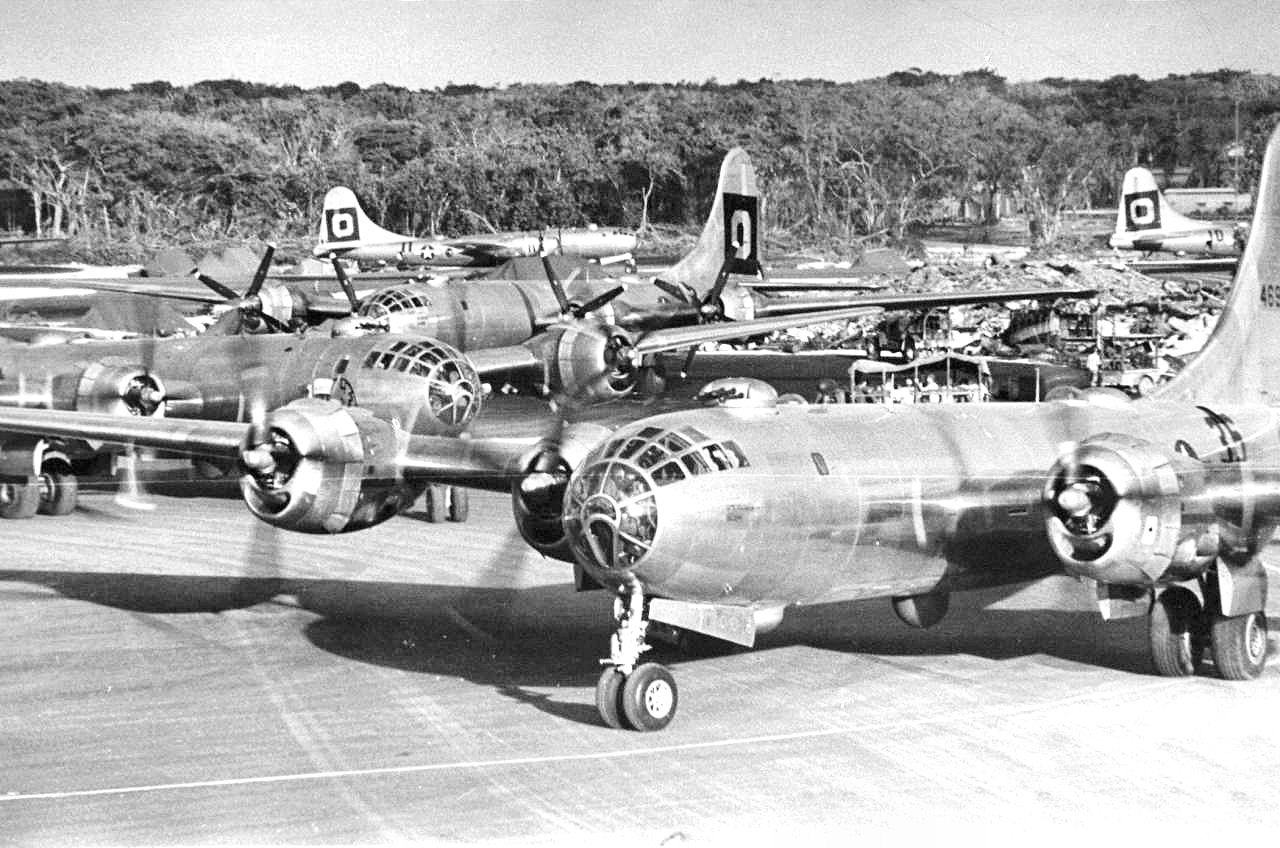
- 29th Bombardment Group North Field Guam 1945
- Active: 1944–1945
- Country: United States
- Branch: United States Air Force
- Role: Command of long range bombers
- Engagements: Pacific Theater

Commanders
- Notable commanders: Brig Gen Roger M. Ramey; Brig Gen Haywood S. Hansell, Jr; Maj Gen Curtis LeMay

The XXI Bomber Command was a unit of the Twentieth Air Force in the Mariana Islands for strategic bombing during World War II.

The command was established at Smoky Hill Army Air Field, Kansas on 1 March 1944. After a period of organization and its assigned groups receiving their B-29 Superfortress aircraft, the command transferred first to Peterson Field, Colorado, then deployed to the central Pacific, being headquartered at Harmon Field, Guam, in the Mariana Islands.

Its assigned units engaged in very long-range bombardment operations, primarily against Japan until mid-July 1945.

== History ==
The Marianas chain of islands, consisting primarily of Saipan, Tinian, and Guam, were considered as being ideal bases from which to launch B-29 Superfortress operations against Japan. The islands were about 1,500 miles (2,400 km) from Tokyo, a range which the B-29s could just about manage. Most important of all, they could be put on a direct supply line from the United States by ship. In August 1944, Major general Haywood S. Hansell, Jr was directed to take over command of the organization.

Serious planning for the movement of the XXI Bomber Command's B-29s from their Second Air Force training bases in Kansas to newly constructed combat airfields on Saipan, Tinian and Guam began in April 1944. The construction and defense of the airfields would be the United States Navy's responsibility, as would logistical support. Before the B-29s could begin operating against Japan from the Marianas, the islands first had to be taken away from the Japanese.

This began with the Battle of Saipan on 11 June 1944 when a four-day naval and air bombardment of the island began. On 15 June United States Marine Corps units stormed ashore, followed a day later by United States Army units. After several weeks of heavy fighting, during which over 3,000 American and 24,000 Japanese people died, the island was finally declared secure on 9 July.

The seizure of Saipan enabled invasions of Guam and Tinian to proceed, which were attacked on 21 and 24 July respectively. Tinian was secured on 1 August and Guam was secured on 10 August.

=== Airfield construction ===
Construction of the B-29 airfields on Saipan began almost immediately, even while the fighting was still going on. Naval Construction Battalions (NCBs), the "SeaBees" began construction at a former Japanese airstrip called Aslito. This was later renamed Isley Field, after Navy Commander Robert H. Isely (his name was misspelled and the incorrect version stuck). The SeaBees did not meet their schedule, but came very close. In a little over three months they had built a support base and airfield on Saipan, capable of supporting the 240 B-29s of the 73d Bombardment Wing and their logistical support units.

On Tinian, the SeaBees built the largest bomber base ever, North Field. The 6th Naval Construction Brigade built four 8,500 feet (2,600 m) runways for the 313th Bombardment Wing, and all required infrastructure; then went to the west end of the island and at West Field laid down two 8,500-foot runways for the 58th Bombardment Wing.

On Guam the 5th NCB built North Field for the 314th Bombardment Wing and Northwest Field for the 315th Bombardment Wing.

=== Initial B-29 Operations ===
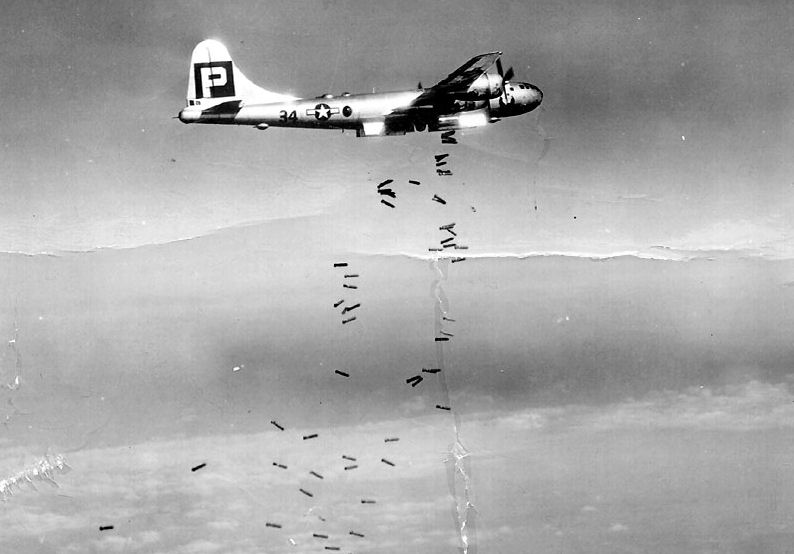
39th Bombardment Group B-29 Superfortress dropping 500 pound high-explosive bombs over Japan. Note the high winds in the jet stream scattering the bombs, making precision bombing ineffective from high altitudes.

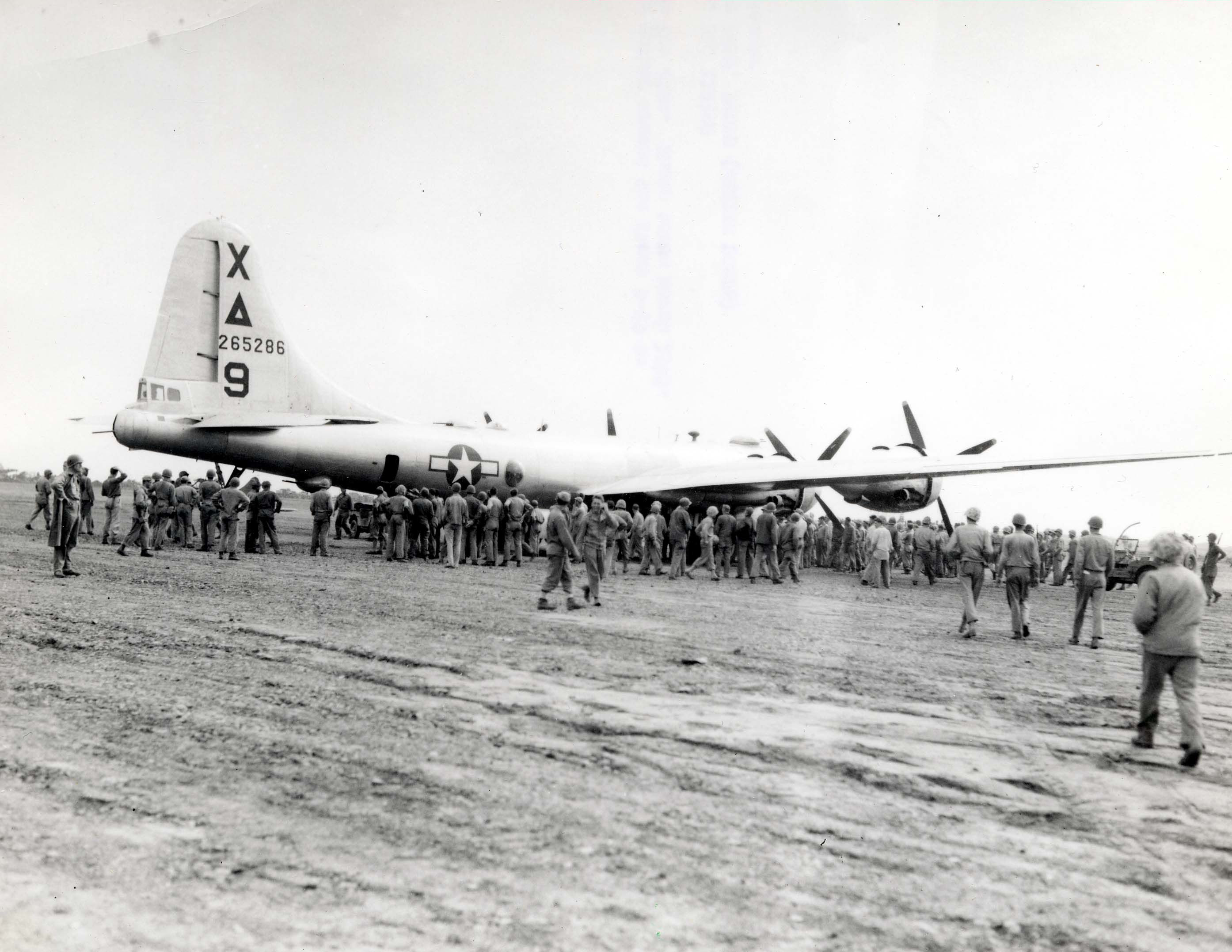
42-65286 1st Bomb Squadron, 9th Bombardment Group, the first to land on Iwo Jima, 4 March 1945.

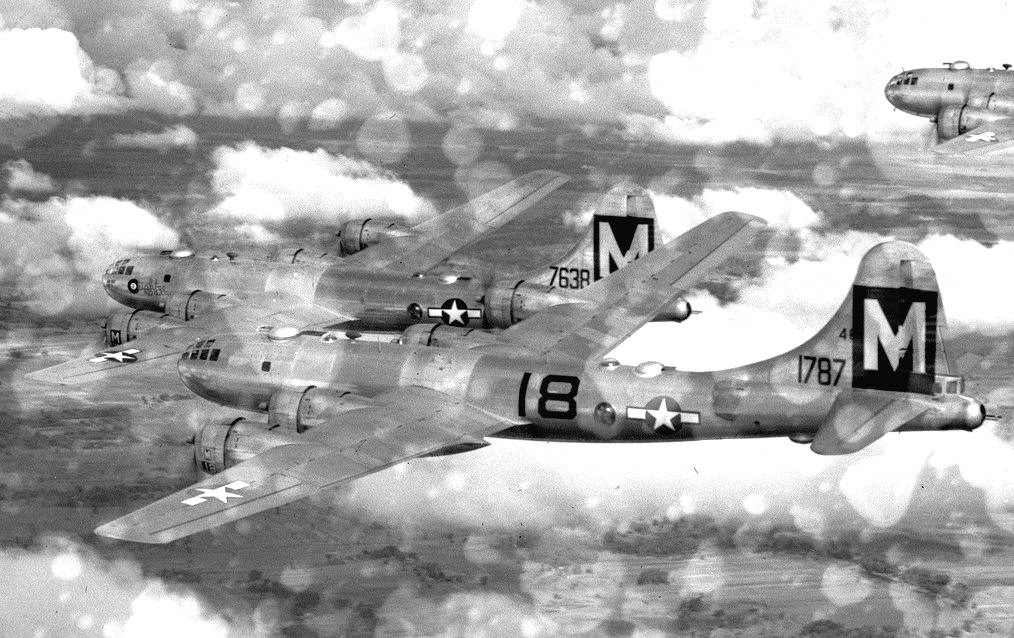
Formation of 19th Bombardment Group B-29 Superfortresses 1945

The 73d Bombardment Wing was ordered to the Marianas rather than to the CBI Theater after its training with Second Air Force in Kansas. The first B-29 arrived at Isley Field, Saipan on 12 October 1944. By 22 November, over 100 B-29s were at Isley Field. XXI Bomber Command was assigned the mission of destroying the aircraft industry of Japan in a series of high-altitude, daylight precision attacks. However, General Hansell was fully aware that his crews still lacked the necessary experience to carry out such missions.

In late October and early November 1944, a series of tactical raids were carried out as training exercises for the crews. On 27 October, 18 B-29s attacked lightly defended Japanese installations on Truk. The submarine pens at Truk were the target, and four Superfortresses had to abort because of the usual engine problems, and combat formations were scrappy. The bombing results were mediocre, with only nine planes bombing the primary target and only a few bombs hitting it. The same two groups returned to Truk on 30 October with even fewer bombs landing on the target. The third try, on 2 November, was briefed as a radar bombing mission. Again the results were indifferent, with bombs scattered all over the general target area.

Aware that there was now a new threat, Japanese aircraft based on Iwo Jima staged a low-level raid on Isley Field on 2 November, damaging several B-29s on the ground. Retaliatory strikes were ordered against the two enemy airfields on Iwo Jima on 5 and 11 November with the 497th and 498th Bombardment Groups dispatched to bomb airfields there, but the results were once again poor. As in the XX Bomber Command Operation Matterhorn bombing campaign from India, the B-29s were in danger of being dissipated in tactical missions and even these were not all that successful.

In order to properly plan missions to Japan, up-to-date reconnaissance photos of the proposed targets were needed. Other than information which was used during the Doolittle Raid in 1942, there was scant information about the locations of Japanese industry, especially the aircraft industry. On 1 November 1944, two days after arriving on Saipan, A 3d Photographic Reconnaissance Squadron F-13A Superfortress (photo reconnaissance-configured B-29) took off bound for Tokyo. The 3d PRS attached to the 73d Bombardment Wing. The aircraft flew over Tokyo at 32,000 feet (9,800 m) for 35 minutes taking picture after picture. A few fighters made it up to the camera plane's altitude, but did not attack. These photos, along with other intelligence gave the XXI Bomber Command the locations of the Japanese aircraft manufacturing plants and enabled mission planners to plan missions for the combat crews to attack. In honor of his mission, the aircraft was named "Tokyo Rose".

The 3d PRS continued to fly single plane missions to Japan, taking high altitude pre-strike target planning photos and post-strike damage assessment photos. The losses incurred by the squadron in this type of activity were relatively light. Seldom were the Japanese able to get fighters up to 30,000 feet (9,100 m) in time to intercept the F-13As.

All four groups of the 73d Wing were sent on their first mission to Japan on 24 November with 111 planes airborne. The target was the Nakajima Aircraft Engine Plant at Musashino in the arsenal sector of Tokyo. Also, for the first time, the B-29 encountered the Jet stream, which was a high-speed wind coming out of the west at speeds as high as 200 miles per hour (320 km/h) at precisely the altitudes at which the bombers were operating. This caused the bomber formations to be disrupted and made accurate bombing impossible. Because of the jet stream winds and bad weather, only 24 planes, from the leading 497th Bomb Group, attacked the primary target; the majority dropped their bombs on the secondary target of the Tokyo Docks.

The group returned to Musashino on the 27th and closed out November with a raid on the Tokyo Industrial Area and Docks. The pace picked up the next month, with a return to Musashino on 3 December. Again, poor bombing results were achieved, with the jet stream winds scattering the bomb drops and the aircraft in the formation, with the result of not much damage to the enemy being done. 8 December saw 82 planes attacking the Iwo Jima airfields (Motoyama Nos 1 and 2). Then it was back to attacking Japan, hitting Nagoya on 18 and 22 December. The airfields on Iwo Jima were revisited on 24 December and Tokyo the final target of the month on 27 December.

In addition to the wing strikes, December saw the initiation of another type of single plane mission: the weather strike. These were missions to Japan to collect weather data and drop nuisance bombs on Japanese cities. Again, these were high altitude missions with surprisingly low losses. The 3d PRS lost two planes in December. Out of the 75 weather strike missions flown in December, there were only three losses. During the same time period the 73rd Wing lost 21 planes to all causes on the six multi-plane raids by the wing as a whole.

The pace continued to quicken for the 73d in January. Musashino on 9 January cost six planes; Nagoya on 14 January, another five. One weather strike, out of 83 flown, was lost on 10 January, but help was on the way as new B-29s from the United States were arriving almost daily and new groups were arriving in the Marianas. The 313th Bombardment Wing, operating from Tinian, sent 44 planes to Pagan Island on 16 January, another 33 to Truk on 21 and 28 January to attack the Iwo Jima airfields on 24 January. Thirty-three more returned to Iwo Jima on 29 January. The 313th's 504th and 505th groups joined in the attack on Kobe on 4 February, while on 9 February their sister groups, the 6th and 9th, made their initial training mission against the Moen Island airfield on Truk.

US Marines landed on Iwo Jima 19 February 1945 with a mission to seize the island to build emergency landing airfields for XXIst Bomber Command as well as fighter airfields for VII Fighter Command. On 25 March the Battle of Iwo Jima was declared over and the island secured, although mopping up continued until June. Construction Battalions extended and transformed the former Japanese fields to accommodate B-29s and the first AAF units moved in during the beginning of March.

=== B-29 Incendiary Operations ===
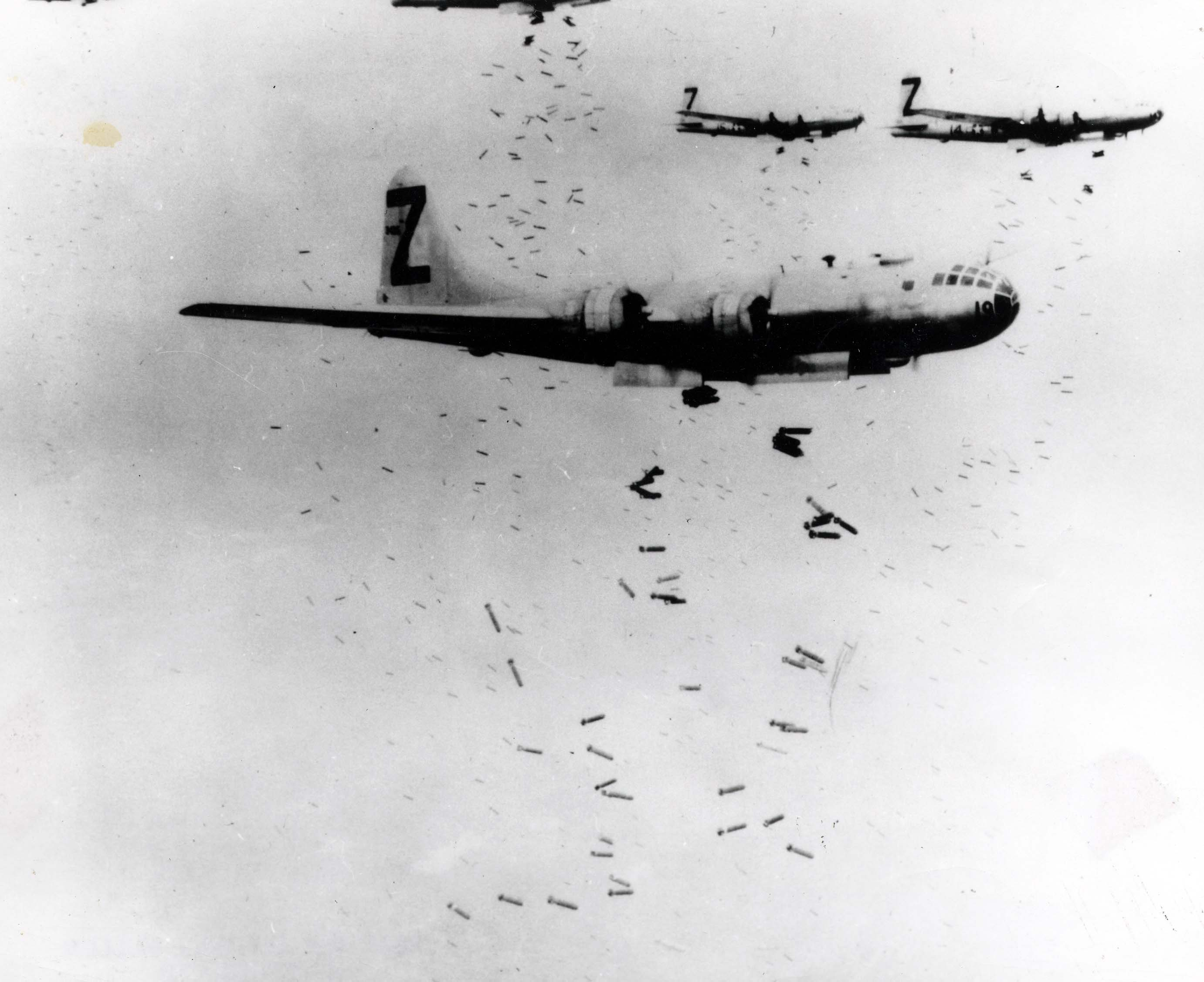
500th Bombardment Group B-29s on an incendiary bomb drop over Japan, 1945

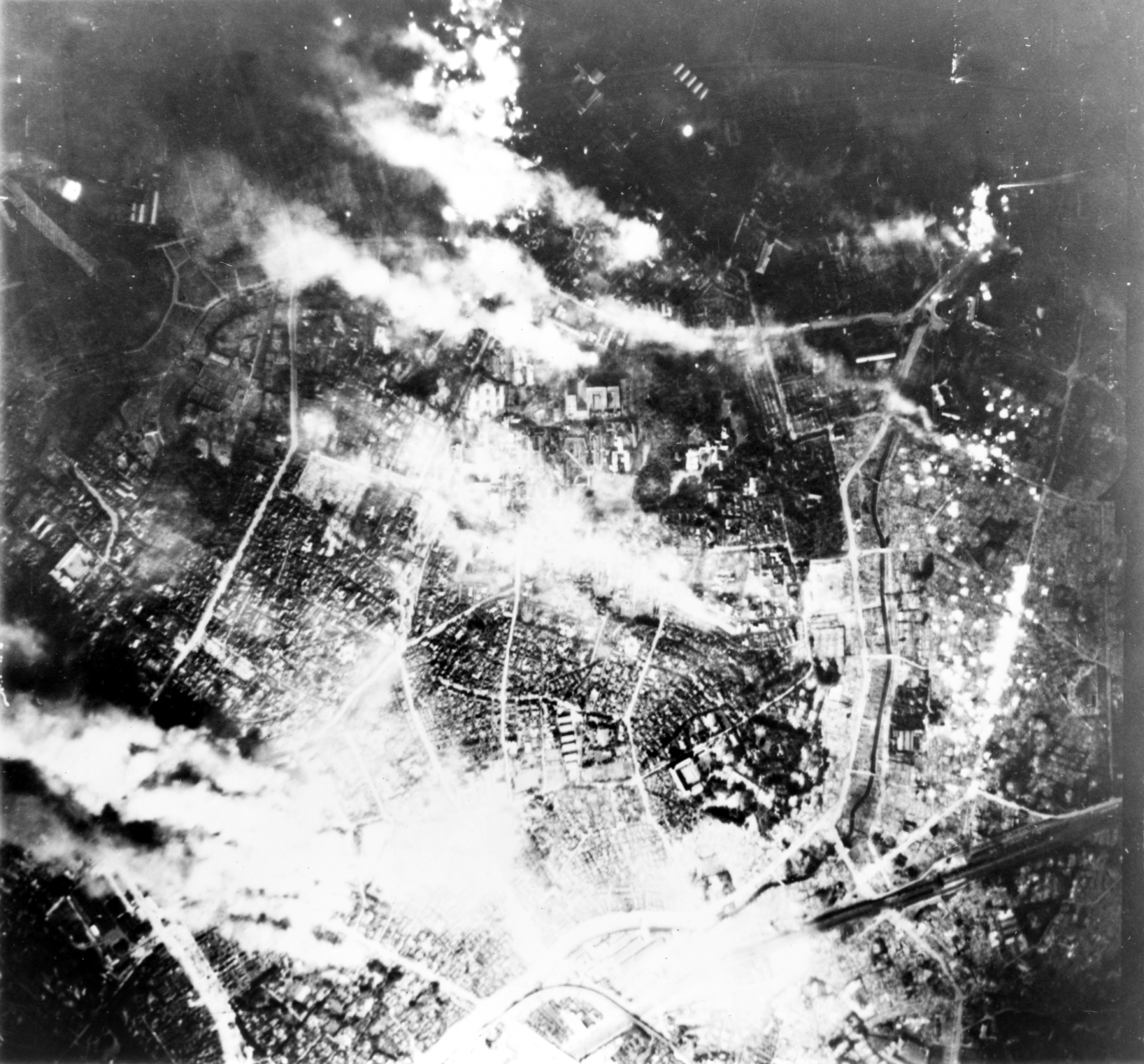
Photo of the firebombing of Tokyo, 26 May 1945.

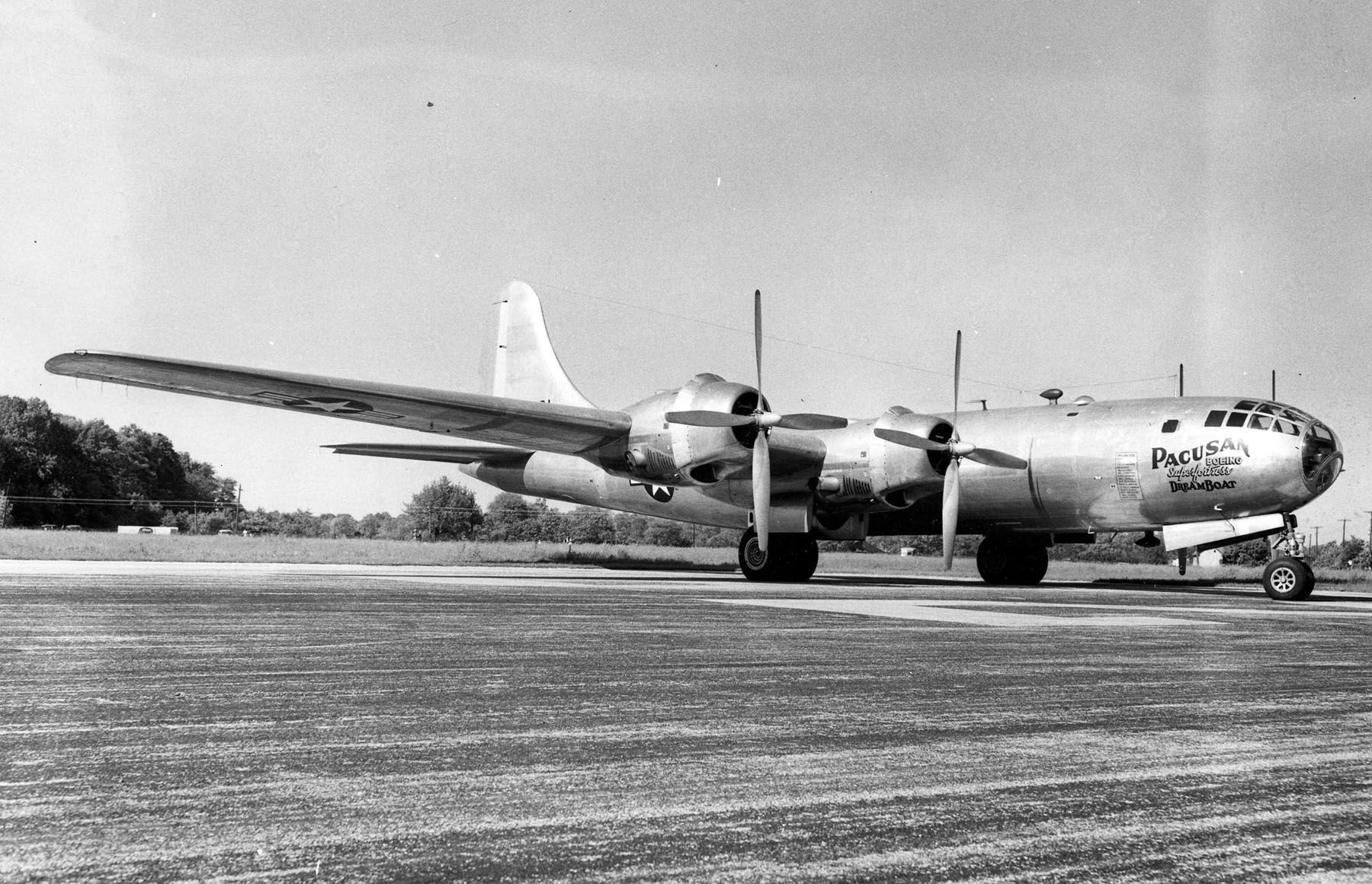
315th Bomb Wing Bell-Atlanta B-29B-60-BA Superfortress "Pacusan Dreamboat" (44-84061), designed for fast hit-and-run raids, 1945.

The high-altitude bombing raids on Japan carried out by the command were not causing significant damage to the targets, primarily due to the jet stream winds over the islands. The failure of the command to successfully carry out its mission was causing severe problems with the War Department in Washington, which had planned to eliminate the Japanese industrial base by the same strategic bombing techniques which were being carried out in Europe. Also General Hap Arnold and the AAF command staff which were aware of the Manhattan Project, and planned on using the B-29 to drop the Atomic Bombs, were concerned that the B-29 would be unable to carry out that highly secret mission.

Since little progress in the bombing campaign was being made, Arnold recalled Hansell and moved General Curtis LeMay from the inactivating XX Bomber Command in India to take over XXI Bomber Command on Saipan. LeMay arrived in the Marianas on 20 January 1945. LeMay had analyzed the structure of the Japanese economy, which depended heavily on cottage industries housed in cities close to major industrial areas and issued new orders on 19 February. His plan was to destroy the feeder industries, that would slow or halt the flow of vital components to the central manufacturing plants, and disorganize the production of weapons vital to Japan. LeMay decided to do this by using incendiary bombs rather than purely high-explosive bombs, which would, it was hoped, cause general conflagrations in large cities like Tokyo or Nagoya, spreading to some of the priority targets. In addition, LeMay had concluded that the effects of the jet stream, cloud cover, and high operating altitudes were to blame for the failure of the B-29 raids to do any significant damage to the Japanese war industry. The initial raids against Japan had taken place at high altitudes in order to stay above anti-aircraft fire and the effective altitude of defending fighters. LeMay suggested that high-altitude, daylight attacks be phased out and replaced by low-altitude, high-intensity incendiary raids at nighttime. The aircraft would attack individually, which meant that no formation assembly over the base at the start of the mission or along the way would be needed. This would extend the range of the aircraft and allow them to reach targets in northern Honshu and Hokkaido.

The 6th and 9th Bombardment Groups joined in the attack on Tokyo on 25 February, as did the 314th Bombardment Wing's 19th Bombardment Group, flying out of North Field, Guam. With these new tactics, a total of 302 B-29s participated in the Operation Meetinghouse raid on Tokyo on the night of 9–10 March, with 279 arriving over the target. The raid was led by special pathfinder crews who marked central aiming points. It lasted for two hours. The raid was a success beyond LeMay's wildest expectations. The individual fires caused by the bombs joined to create a general conflagration, which would have been classified as a firestorm but for prevailing winds gusting at 17 to 28 mph (27 to 45 km/h). When it was over, sixteen square miles of the center of Tokyo had gone up in flames and nearly 100,000 people had been killed. Fourteen B-29s were lost. The B-29 was finally beginning to have an effect.

On the night of 13–14 March, eight square miles of Osaka went up in flames. On 16–17 March, three square miles of Kobe were destroyed, and on 19–20 March in a return visit to Nagoya, three more square miles were destroyed. This destructive week had killed over 120,000 Japanese civilians at the cost of only 20 B-29s lost.

A month later, on 12 April, the 314th Bombardment Wing's remaining two groups, the 39th and 330th, joined in the attack on the Hodagaya Chemical Works in Koriyama. With the addition of the 39th and 330th, the XXI Bomber Command now had three wings, twelve groups, thirty-six squadrons of 15 B-29s each at their disposal. In May, the 58th Bombardment Wing completed its move from India to Tinian, adding four more groups to the XXI Bomber Command.

In April 1945, LeMay gave new orders for more incendiary raids. This time, aircraft engine factories at Musashino and Nagoya were to be hit, but urban areas in Tokyo, Nagoya, Osaka, Kawasaki, Kobe, and Yokohama were also to be attacked. On 7 April 153 B-29s struck the Mitsubishi Heavy Industries aircraft-engine complex at Nagoya, destroying about 90 percent of that facility. Five days later, 93 B-29s destroyed the Nakajima factory at Musashino. The Japanese aircraft engine industry essentially ceased to exist after this time. On 13 April 327 B-29s burned out eleven more square miles of Tokyo. Seven more B-29s were lost.

On 5 June, the B-29s attacked Kobe with such effectiveness that the city was crossed off the target list as not worth revisiting. By the end of the month, the six major cities on LeMay's list had all been effectively destroyed.

Late May saw the arrival of the first of the 315th Bombardment Wing, whose B-29B planes were equipped with the new AN/APQ-7 "Eagle" radar. The antenna for this radar was an 18-foot, wing-shaped unit mounted under the forward fuselage. The antenna swept a 60-degree arc along the flight path of the plane, and a higher frequency (X-band) signal gave a much-improved radarscope picture. The 315th had been trained for low-altitude, nighttime pathfinder missions. Between 26 June and 10 August, they carried out a series of 15 strikes against oil production facilities which essentially shut down the Japanese oil industry. The B-29Bs were also stripped of much defensive gunnery, adding capacity for additional incendiary or high-explosive bombs.

By now, the B-29 raids were essentially unopposed by Japanese fighters. In late June, B-29 crews felt sufficiently confident that they began to drop leaflets warning the population of forthcoming attacks, followed three days later by a raid in which the specified urban area was devastated by mass carpet bombing. By the end of June, the civilian population began to show signs of panic, and the Imperial Cabinet first began to consider negotiating an end to the war. However, at that time, the Japanese military was adamant about continuing on to the bitter end.

In June 1945, the XX and XXI Bombardment Commands were grouped under the U.S. Strategic Air Forces in the Pacific (USASTAF), under the command of General Carl A. Spaatz. The history of XXI Bomber Command terminated on 16 July 1945. On that date the command was redesignated Headquarters and Headquarters Squadron, Twentieth Air Force. This redesignation brought to an end the XXI Bomber Command as a separate establishment, as it was absorbed into the internal organizational structure of Twentieth Air Force and was placed under the command of USASTAF.

== Lineage ==
- Constituted as the XXI Bomber Command on 1 March 1944, and activated the same day.

Activated on 1 March 1944
Inactivated 16 July 1945 (Note: Headquarters, XXI Bomber Command was redesignated Headquarters, Twentieth Air force and the command ceased to exist as an establishment.)

=== Assignments ===
- Second Air Force, 1 March 1944 (attached to 17th Bombardment Operational Training Wing c. 15 April 1944 – 20 October 1944
- Twentieth Air Force, 9 November 1944 – 16 July 1945

=== Stations ===
- Smoky Hill Army Air Field, Kansas, 1 March – 11 June 1944
- Peterson Field, Colorado, 11 June – 20 October 1944
- Harmon Field, Guam, Marianas Islands, 4 December 1944 – 16 July 1945

=== Components ===
Wings

- 58th Bombardment Wing, Based at West Field, Tinian, 29 March – 16 July 1945

The 58th was the first B-29 Superfortress Wing, initially based in India with XX Bomber Command in April 1944. It began combat missions from Tinian in early May 1945. It primarily flew missions over urban areas of Japan, dropping incendiary bombs over wide areas to destroy Japanese industry and military capability.

40th Bombardment Group (Triangle-S)
444th Bombardment Group (Triangle-N)

462d Bombardment Group (Triangle-U)
468th Bombardment Group (Triangle-I)

- 73d Bombardment Wing, Based at Isley Field, Saipan, 9 November 1944 – 16 July 1945

The 73d was the second B-29 wing, used as a training organization by Second Air Force until deployed to the Pacific Theater. It began combat missions from Saipan in late October 1944. The primary mission of the 73d was the firebombing of Japan, flying low-level night missions dropping incendiary bombs over wide areas to destroy Japanese industry and military capability.

497th Bombardment Group 'A' over black square over aircraft number; later Large 'A', number moved to empennage..
498th Bombardment Group 'T' over black square over aircraft number; later Large 'T', number moved to empanage.

499th Bombardment Group 'V' over black square over aircraft number; later Large 'V', number moved to empanage.
500th Bombardment Group 'Z' over black square over aircraft number; later Large 'Z', number moved to empanage.

- 313th Bombardment Wing, 8 June 1944 – 16 July 1945 Based at North Field, Tinian

The 313th participated in the fire-bombing raids, but its primary mission was the mining of Japanese sea lanes. It began combat missions from Tinian in early February 1945. The mining operation was conceived by the United States Navy. At the time, it was considered a secondary mission, but later analysis revealed that it had a devastating effect. Japan was an island nation highly dependent on imports, especially fuel and food. The operation resulted in imports being reduced by almost 95%. This caused enormous shortages.

6th Bombardment Group (Circle-R), later L over black triangle
9th Bombardment Group (Circle-X), later X over black triangle
504th Bombardment Group (Circle-E), later E over black triangle

505th Bombardment Group (Circle-K), later K over black triangle
509th Composite Group* (Varying tail codes, Circle-R, later Circle Fwd Arrow) (Note: >The 509th used other group markings to help conceal itself.. The 509th Composite Group reported directly to the Twentieth Air Force Commander.)

- 314th Bombardment Wing, 8 June 1944 – 16 July 1945 Based at North Field, Guam

The 314th began combat missions from Guam in late February 1945. It participated in the fire bombing, but the first ten-day blitz resulting in the Army Air Forces running out of incendiary bombs. Like her sister wings, the 314th then flew conventional strategic bombing missions using high explosive bombs.

19th Bombardment Group (Solid Black Square-White M)
29th Bombardment Group (Solid Black Square-White O)

39th Bombardment Group (Solid Black Square-White P)
330th Bombardment Group (VH) (Solid Black Square-White K)

- 315th Bombardment Wing, Guam, 5 April 1945 – 16 July 1945 Based at Northwest Field

The fifth and last B-29 wing to be assigned to XXI Bomber Command, the groups of the 315th were equipped with the fast B-29B Superfortress variant armed only with a radar controlled tail turret and fitted with Eagle radar. Its mission was the destruction of the Japanese petroleum industry. It began combat missions from Guam in June 1945.

16th Bombardment Group (Diamond-B)
501st Bombardment Group (Diamond-Y)

331st Bombardment Group (Diamond-L)
502d Bombardment Group (Diamond-H)

Groups

- 19th Bombardment Group, 14 December 1944 – 27 January 1945
- 39th Bombardment Group, 1 April 1944 – c. 18 February 1945 (attached to 17th Bombardment Operational Training Wing, c. 15 April 1944 – 8 January 1945)
- 501st Bombardment Group, 14 April – 19 June 1945 (attached to 315th Bombardment Wing after 15 April 1945)

Squadrons

- 3d Photographic Reconnaissance Squadron: attached December 1944 – 16 July 1945
- 41st Photographic Reconnaissance Squadron: attached 13 June – 16 July 1945

== See also ==
- Air raids on Japan
- Bombing of Tokyo
- Bombing of Nagoya in World War II
