= 3rd Space Operations Squadron =

US Space Force squadron

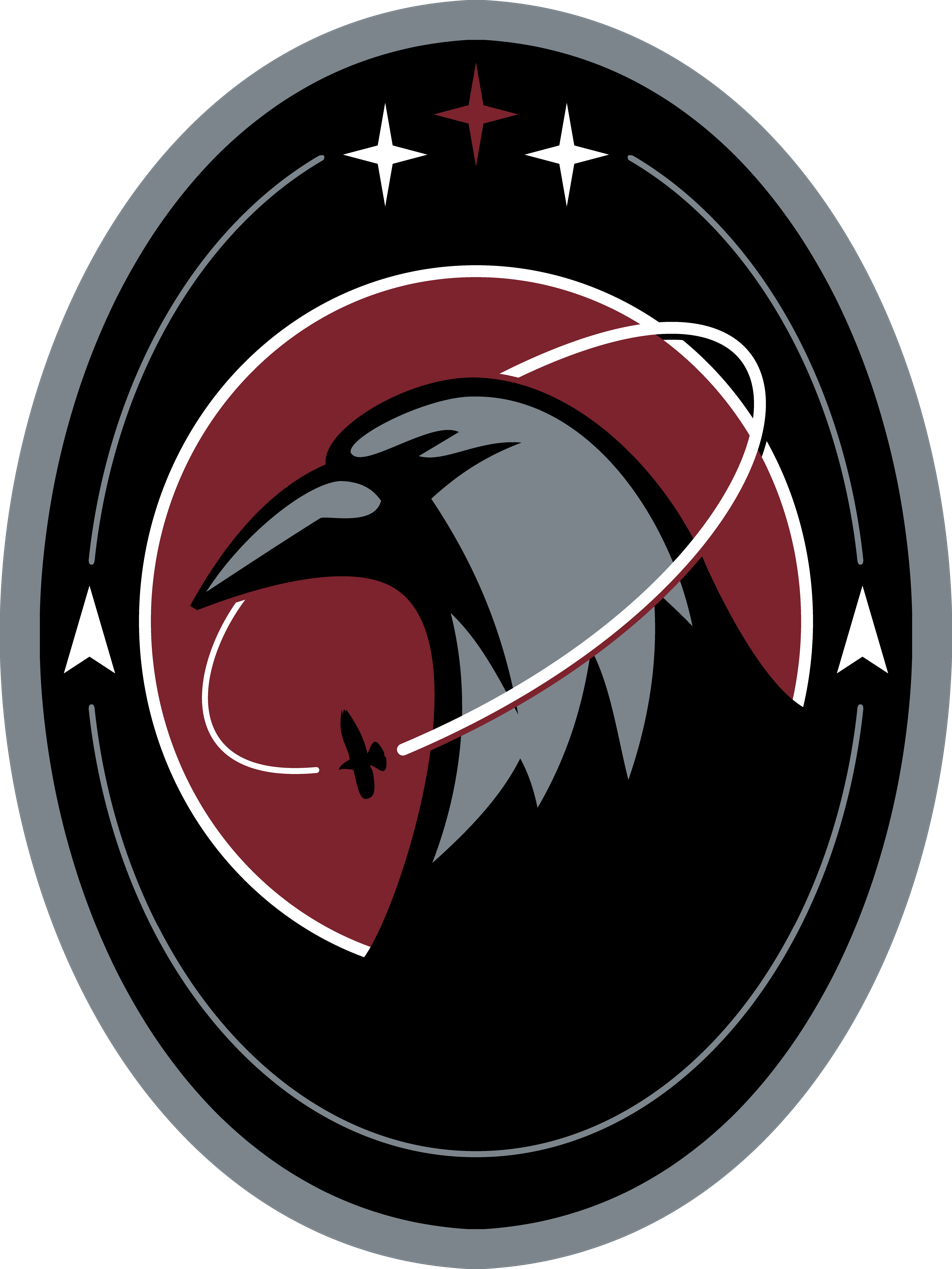
- Emblem of the 3rd Space Operations Squadron
- Active: 1941–1947; 1990–13 June 2017; 2020–present
- Country: United States
- Branch: United States Space Force
- Type: Satellite Operations
- Role: Combat Support
- Part of: Space Delta 9
- Headquarters: Schriever Space Force Base, Colorado
- Engagements: American Theater; China Burma India Theater; Pacific Theater
- Decorations: Air Force Outstanding Unit Award

Commanders
- Commander: Lt Col Kenneth P. Grosselin

Insignia
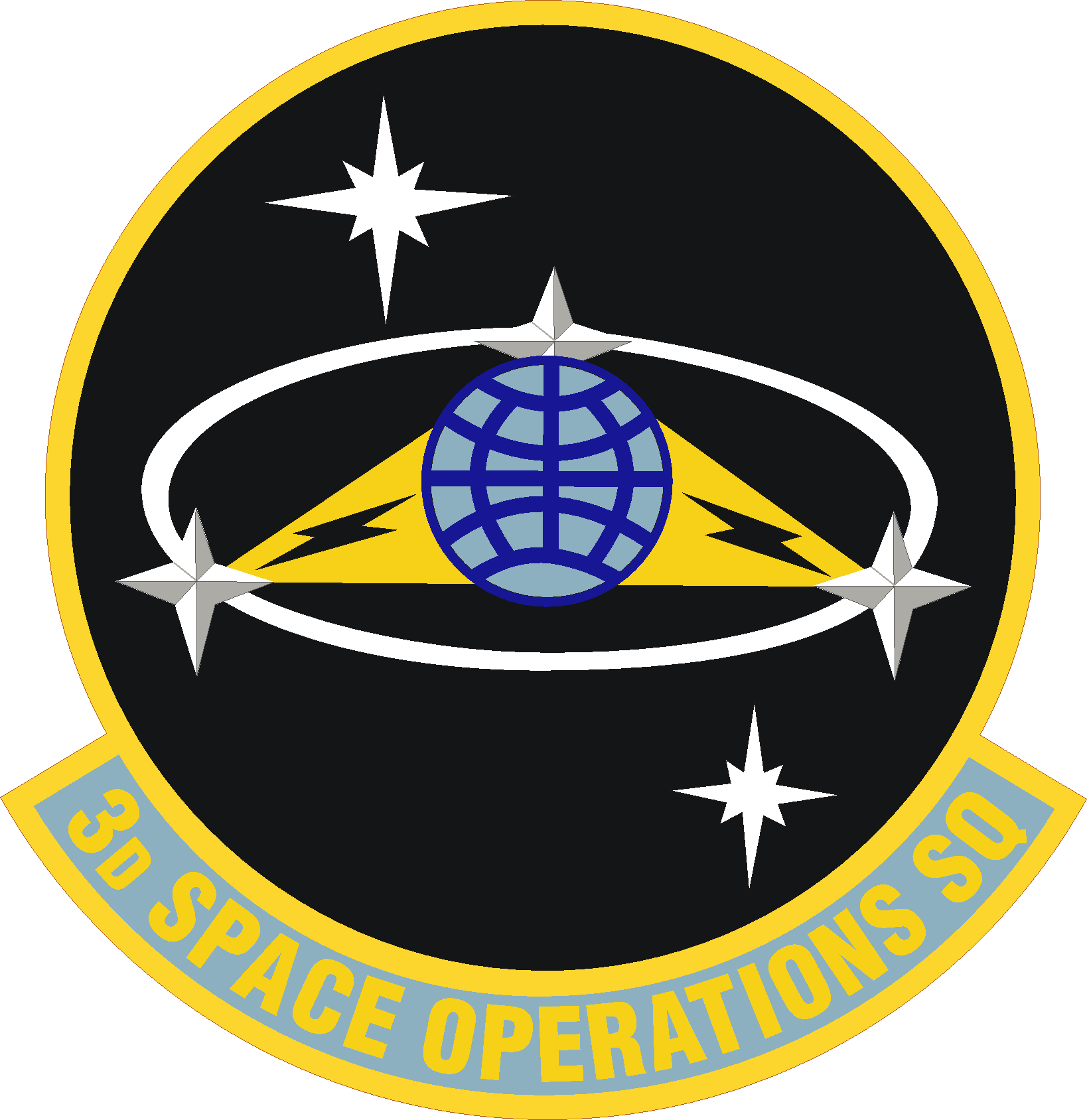
- 3rd Space Operations Squadron emblem (in use until transfer to the Space Force)

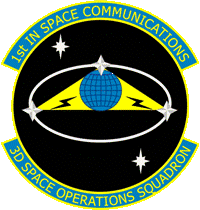
- 3rd Space Operations Squadron emblem (Approved 5 May 1992)

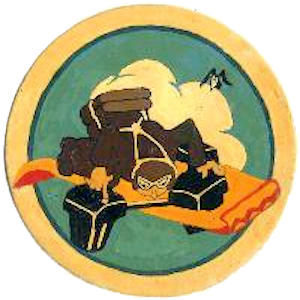
- 3rd Reconnaissance Squadron emblem (Approved 24 July 1943)

The 3rd Space Operations Squadron (3 SOPS) is a United States Space Force unit responsible for conducting on-orbit operations. It is located at Schriever Space Force Base, Colorado.

== Mission ==
3rd SOPS was reactivated on June 19, 2020, to conduct on-orbit operations in support of Commander USSPACECOM requirements, and is executing proof of concept, Tactics, Techniques and Procedures, and concept of operations development to operationalize experimentation and demonstrations.

Before the squadron was inactivated in 2017, its mission was to ensure reliable space-borne communications to the President, the Secretary of Defense and U.S. and Allied Forces. The mission is accomplished by conducting launch and on-orbit operations for the Defense Satellite Communications System Phase III satellites and Wideband Global Satellite. These satellites provide secure high-rate data communications links to the President, the Secretary of Defense, theater commanders, and strategic and tactical forces worldwide.

== History ==
=== World War II ===
The squadron was first activated at Maxwell Field, Alabama as the 3rd Photographic Squadron under the 1st Photographic Group in May 1941. It performed aerial mapping primarily over the southeastern United States prior to the Pearl Harbor Attack using Bell P-39 Airacobra sub-variants (F-2) which were equipped for the ground-attack and reconnaissance roles. After the United States' entry into World War II, the unit flew aerial mapping missions over the Caribbean and northern South America, mapping various islands for locations of airfields to support the South Atlantic Transport route and Antilles Air Command antisubmarine mission. In addition, it flew aerial mapping missions over Western Canada and the Alaska Territory, mapping uncharted territory to support the building of the Alaska Highway.

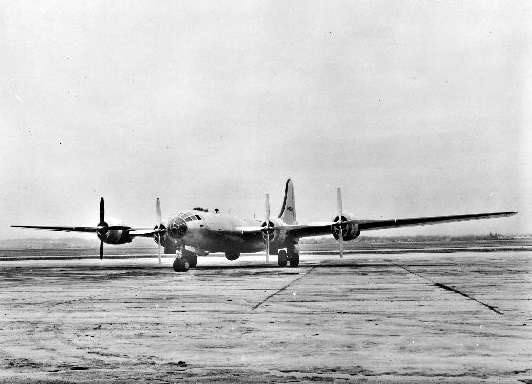
Boeing F-13 Reconnaissance Aircraft

The squadron deployed to the China-Burma-India theater in December 1943, performing unarmed long-range mapping of remote areas of the Theater over combat areas in support of ground forces and strategic target identification over Indochina and Malay Peninsula for follow-up raids by XX Bomber Command operating from India.

The 3d returned to the United States in early 1944 and was re-equipped with very long range Boeing B-29 Superfortresses converted to F-13A reconnaissance configuration. While the squadron was training, XXI Bomber Command identified the need to include a flight of ferret aircraft in the squadron. These aircraft would assist the strategic bombing campaign against Japan by identifying electronic threats and assisting with jamming efforts. No B-29 ferrets had been developed, so the first of these aircraft was a B-24J, which deployed to the Pacific in February 1945.

On 1 November 1944, a 3rd Photographic Reconnaissance Squadron F-13 became the first American aircraft over Tokyo since the famed Doolittle Raid in 1942. The entire 3d deployed to the Central Pacific Area in January 1945 and was attached to XXI Bomber Command. An additional five B-24M aircraft were modified at Wright Field, Ohio to fully equip the squadron's ferret flight, but one was diverted to March Field, California to establish a ferret training flight. Upon arrival at Guam, these planes were modified for night operations. The Guam Air Depot also modified three of these aircraft to include a capability to intercept Japanese voice communications to better understand Japanese fighter direction techniques. Two radio intercept positions were installed, staffed by Japanese linguist volunteers from the 8th Radio Squadron, Mobile.

The squadron supported the strategic air offensive over the Japanese Home Islands. By the end of the war, the 3rd PRS had flown 460 combat missions mainly over Japan. By the end of the war, the 3d had flown 460 combat missions mainly over Japan. Shortly after the end of the war, the growing importance of its radio countermeasures mission in comparison to its photographic mission was recognized by its redesignation as the 3rd Reconnaissance Squadron, Very Long Range (Photographic-RCM). It remained in the Western Pacific performing reconnaissance mapping flights over Japan, Korea, and China.

The squadron's F-13s returned to the United States in early 1946 for storage or reassignment. It was inactivated in early 1947.

=== From the 1980s ===
In 1985, the initial cadre of Air Force NATO III and DSCS II satellite operators received training at Sunnyvale Air Force Station, California. These personnel relocated to Falcon Air Force Base in 1987 and became Operating Location-AB, Consolidated Space Test Center. These men and women became the nucleus of what would eventually become the 3rd Space Operations Squadron (SOPS). On 2 August 1988, OL-AB began 24-hour operations at Falcon AFS. By May 1989, OL-AB was conducting station-keeping maneuvers on NATO III and DSCS II satellites. On 2 February 1990, OL-AB was discontinued and its personnel, equipment and mission were transferred to the newly activated 3rd Satellite Control Squadron (SCS).

In November 1990, the 3d SCS was directed to relocate a DSCS II satellite from over the Pacific to a position over the Indian Ocean to support Operation Desert Shield. The series of relocation maneuvers were completed in December 1990 and the satellite was then configured for operational use. Crews saved a failing FLTSATCOM spacecraft just as Operation Desert Storm commenced, ensuring the U.S. Navy's two carrier groups had command and control of their aircraft.

On 11 July 1991, in a formal operations turnover ceremony, the squadron accepted the complete operational mission transfer of all assigned satellite programs. This transfer officially established operational control of the assigned DOD communications satellites to Air Force Space Command.

On 30 January 1992, as part of a reorganization at Falcon AFB, the 3d SCS was redesignated the 3d SOPS.

On 25 March 1993, the first UHF F/O satellite was launched. Unfortunately due to an Atlas II rocket booster malfunction, the satellite was placed in the wrong orbit. Over the next several weeks, squadron personnel planned and executed a series of 25 maneuvers to move the satellite to a super-synchronous orbit. The commander of Air Force Space Command recognized 3rd SOPS for their efforts.

In June 1996, as part of an Air Force and Navy agreement, operations of the FLTSAT constellation were turned over to the Naval Satellite Operations Center at Point Mugu, California. In December 1996, 3rd SOPS transferred control of the Milstar constellation to the 4th SOPS. On 18 December 1996, the 3d SOPS gained control of five operating locations in Nebraska, Virginia, Guam, Italy, and Hawaii. The OLs were responsible for running the Air Force's Satellite Management Centers, which monitored and controlled user access to UHF communications satellites. As part of the same agreement that transferred FLTSAT, the SMC's mission was also transferred to the Navy.

On 2 July 1999, as part of the same agreement that transferred FLTSAT to the Navy, operational control of UHF F/O Flights 2–9 transferred to NAVSOC. On 10 February 2000, after several months of on-orbit checkout, 3rd SOPS conducted its last UHF F/O sortie on Flight 10.

As part of the Congressionally mandated Base Realignment and Closure decision to close Onizuka Air Force Station, the 3d SOPS assumed the DSCS III launch mission from 5th SOPS.

== Lineage ==
3rd Reconnaissance Squadron

- Constituted as the 3rd Photographic Squadron on 15 May 1941

Activated on 10 June 1941
Redesignated as 3rd Mapping Squadron on 13 January 1942
Redesignated as 3rd Photographic Mapping Squadron on 9 June 1942
Redesignated as 3rd Photographic Reconnaissance Squadron, Very Heavy on 19 May 1944
Redesignated as 3rd Reconnaissance Squadron, Very Long Range (Photographic-RCM) on 19 September 1945
Redesignated as 3rd Reconnaissance Squadron, Very Long Range, Photographic on 16 January 1946
Inactivated on 15 March 1947

- Consolidated with the 3rd Space Operations Squadron on 13 October 1994 as the 3rd Space Operations Squadron

3rd Space Operations Squadron

- Redesignated as 3rd Satellite Control Squadron and activated on 9 January 1990

Redesignated as 3rd Space Operations Squadron on 30 January 1992

- Consolidated with the 3rd Reconnaissance Squadron on 13 October 1994
- Consolidated with the 4th Space Operations Squadron on 13 June 2017
- Reactivated on June 19, 2020

=== Assignments ===
- 1st Photographic (later Mapping; Photographic Charting) Group, 10 June 1941
- 11th Photographic Group, 1 December 1943
- 311th Photographic (later Reconnaissance) Wing, 5 October 1944 (attached to Twentieth Air Force, 1 November 1944 – 13 December 1944, XXI Bomber Command, 14 December 1944 – 15 July 1945, Twentieth Air Force, 16 July 1945 – 2 February 1947)
- Twentieth Air Force, 3 February – 15 March 1947
- 2d Space Wing, 9 January 1990
- 50th Operations Group, 1 January 1992 – 13 June 2017

=== Stations ===
- Maxwell Field, Alabama, 10 June 1941
- MacDill Field, Florida, 22 December 1941
- Smoky Hill Army Air Field, Kansas, 16 April – 3 August 1944
- Isley Field, Saipan, Mariana Islands, 18 September 1944
- Harmon Field, Guam, Mariana Islands, 11 January 1945 – 15 March 1947
- Falcon Air Force Base (later Schriever Air Force Base), Colorado, 9 January 1990 – 13 June 2017

=== Aircraft/Satellites operated ===
- P-39/F-2 Airacobra, 1942
- B-25/F-10 Mitchell, 1942–1944
- B-24/F-7 Liberator, 1943–1945
- B-17/F9 Flying Fortress, 1944; 1946–1947
- B-29/F-13A Superfortress, 1944–1947
- Wideband Global Satellite (2007–2017)
- UHF Follow-On (1990–2004)
- DSCS III(1990–2017)
- Skynet IV/NATO IV (1990–2004)
- FLTSATCOM (1990–2017)
- DSCS II (1990–2017)

== Awards and campaigns ==
- Air Force Outstanding Unit Award

1 September 1990 – 31 August 1991
1 October 2000 – 1 October 2001

1 October 2001 – 1 October 2002
2 October 2002 – 2 October 2003

- American Theater of World War II
- China Burma India Theater Pacific Theater
- Campaigns

Western Pacific

Air Offensive, Japan

== List of commanders ==
- Capt H. C. Houston, 10 Jun 1941
- 1 Lt R. H. Payne, 16 April 1942
- Maj Carl C. Hughes, 7 May 1942
- Capt Robert S. Dodson, 10 August 1942
- Lt Col Patrick B. McCarthy, 23 July 1943
- Maj Robert C. Hutton, June 1945 – unknown
- Lt Col Victor P. Budura Jr., 2 February 1990
- Lt Col Bruce M. Roang, 21 August 1990
- Lt Col Stephen R. Gast, 27 July 1992
- Lt Col Mark H. Owen, 17 February 1995
- Lt Col Susan P. Asher, 24 June 1996
- Lt Col Thomas W. Billick, 29 September 1998
- Lt Col Michael R. Dickey, 10 July 2000
- Lt Col David M. Tobin, 2 July 2002
- Lt Col Anthony K. Hinson, 2 July 2003
- Lt Col William Bishop Jr., 20 June 2005
- Lt Col P. Brent McArthur, 28 June 2007
- Lt Col Jean Eisenhut, 23 June 2009
- Lt Col Kevin Mortensen, 3 August 2011 – February 2012
- Lt Col Chadwick Igl, March 2012 – June 2014
- Lt Col Michael Todd, 24 June 2014 – ~20 June 2016
- Lt Col Joshua Brooks, 20 June 2016 – 13 June 2017
- Lt Col Bryony L. Slaughter, ~19 June 2020 – 14 June 2022
- Lt Col Joshua M. Faustman, 14 June 2022 – 28 June 2024
- Lt Col Kenneth P Grosselin, 28 June 2024 - present
