= Harman =

Harman may refer to:

== People ==
- Harman (surname)
- Harman Baweja (born 1980), Indian actor and producer
- Harman Bhangu, Canadian politician
- Harman Blennerhassett (1764–1831), Anglo-Irish lawyer and plantation owner
- Harman Grisewood (1906–1997), English radio actor, radio and television executive, writer

== Places ==
- Harman, Australian Capital Territory
- Hărman, Romania
- Harman, West Virginia
- Harmans, Maryland
- Harman, Virginia
- Harman's Cross, Dorset, England

== Other uses ==
- Harman International, an electronics audio manufacturer owned by Samsung Electronics
- Harman Technology, the parent company of Ilford Photo
- Harmane or harman, 1-methyl-9H-pyrido[3,4-b]indole, one of the harmala alkaloids, a reversible inhibitor of MAO-A (RIMA)
- USS Harman (PF-79), a United States Navy patrol frigate that served in the Royal Navy as HMS Dominica (K507)

== See also ==
- Harmon (disambiguation)
- Harmanus
