= Harmon Der Donnerschlag =

American homebuilt aircraft

Der Donnerschlag

General information
- Type: Homebuilt aircraft
- National origin: United States
- Manufacturer: Harmon Engineering Company
- Status: Production completed

History
- Variant: Harmon Mister America

The Harmon Der Donnerschlag (English: Thunderclap) is an American homebuilt aircraft that was designed and produced by Harmon Engineering of Howe, Texas. The aircraft was intended for amateur construction.

== Design and development ==
Der Donnerschlag features a wire-braced shoulder-wing, a single-seat open cockpit, fixed landing gear and a single engine in tractor configuration.

The aircraft's 19.5 ft (5.9 m) span wing has two beam-type spars and employs a 16% airfoil at the wing root, tapering to a 12% airfoil at the wingtip. The standard engine used is the 75 hp (56 kW) Volkswagen air-cooled engine automotive conversion, driving a two-bladed wooden propeller.

The aircraft has an empty weight of 350 lb (160 kg) and a gross weight of 600 lb (270 kg), giving a useful load of 250 lb (110 kg). With full fuel of 10 U.S. gallons (38 L; 8.3 imp gal) the payload is 190 lb (86 kg).

The aircraft was later developed into the Harmon Mister America.

== Operational history ==
By October 2013 there were no examples registered in the United States with the Federal Aviation Administration and none may exist anymore.

== Specifications (Der Donnerschlag) ==
Data from Plane and Pilot

General characteristics

- Crew: one
- Length: 14 ft 6 in (4.42 m)
- Wingspan: 19 ft 6 in (5.94 m)
- Empty weight: 350 lb (159 kg)
- Gross weight: 600 lb (272 kg)
- Fuel capacity: 10 U.S. gallons (38 L; 8.3 imp gal)
- Powerplant: 1 × Volkswagen air-cooled engine four cylinder, air-cooled, four stroke automotive-conversion engine, 75 hp (56 kW)
- Propellers: 2-bladed wooden

Performance

- Maximum speed: 120 mph (190 km/h, 100 kn)
- Cruise speed: 110 mph (180 km/h, 96 kn)
- Stall speed: 55 mph (89 km/h, 48 kn)
- Range: 500 mi (800 km, 430 nmi)
- Service ceiling: 10,000 ft (3,000 m)
- Rate of climb: 800 ft/min (4.1 m/s)
