= Harmon Mister America =

Mister America

General information
- Type: Light sports monoplane
- Manufacturer: Harmon Engineering Company
- Designer: James B. Harmon
- Number built: 2

History
- First flight: 1975
- Developed from: Harmon Der Donnerschlag

The Harmon Mister America was a 1970s American single-seat light sports aircraft designed by James B. Harmon. Plans for home building were made available from the Harmon Engineering Company. It is a mid-wing cantilever monoplane with a low-set tailplane and a fixed-tailwheel landing gear. The prototype (N7UN) first flew in 1975 powered by a 60-hp (45 kW) 1200cc Volkswagen air-cooled engine.

== Operational history ==
In November 2014 one example was registered in the United States with the Federal Aviation Administration.

== Specifications ==
Data from Jane's All The World's Aircraft 1976–77

General characteristics

- Crew: 1
- Length: 15 ft 2 in (4.62 m)
- Wingspan: 19 ft 8 in (5.99 m)
- Height: 5 ft 0 in (1.52 m)
- Wing area: 76.0 sq ft (7.06 m^{2})
- Aspect ratio: 4.916:1
- Empty weight: 430 lb (195 kg)
- Gross weight: 650 lb (295 kg)
- Powerplant: 1 × 1200cc Volkswagen air-cooled engine , 60 hp (45 kW)

Performance

- Maximum speed: 125 mph (201 km/h, 109 kn)
- Cruise speed: 100 mph (161 km/h, 87 kn)
- Range: 400 mi (643 km, 350 nmi)
- Service ceiling: 12,000 ft (3,660 m)
- Rate of climb: 800 ft/min (4.1 m/s)
