= Harmon Engineering Company =

American aircraft manufacturer

- Company type: Privately held company
- Industry: Aerospace
- Fate: Out of business after 1978
- Products: Aircraft plans

The Harmon Engineering Company was an American aircraft manufacturer based in Howe, Texas. The company specialized in aircraft plans for amateur construction.

The company's original design, given the German name, Harmon Der Donnerschlag (English: Thunderclap) is a simple, open cockpit, single-seat mid-wing aircraft, built with a welded 4130 steel tube fuselage and wooden-framed wings, all covered in doped aircraft fabric covering. The aircraft was later developed into the Harmon Mister America, which uses the same construction methods and has a similar lay-out. Both designs also employ inexpensive automotive Volkswagen air-cooled engines.

== Aircraft ==
Summary of aircraft designed by Harmon Engineering
Model name	First flight	Number built	Type
Harmon Der Donnerschlag			Single seat sport airplane
Harmon Mister America	1975	At least one	Single seat sport airplane
