= Twentieth Air Force =

Numbered air force of the US Air Force

Twentieth Air Force (Air Forces Strategic)
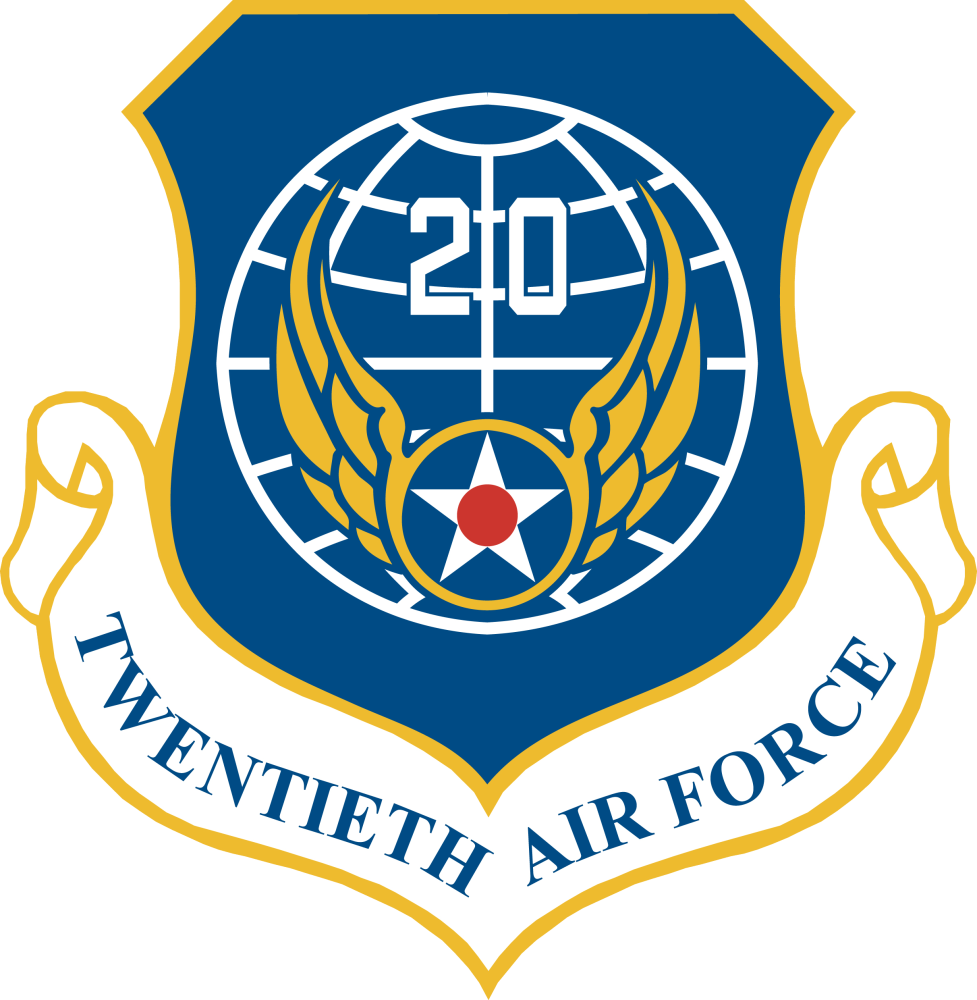
- Shield of the Twentieth Air Force
- Active: 1 December 2009 – present (as Twentieth Air Force (Air Forces Strategic)); 1 September 1991 – 1 December 2009; 4 April 1944 – 1 March 1955 (as Twentieth Air Force) (82 years, 4 months)
- Country: United States of America
- Branch: United States Air Force (18 September 1947 – present); United States Army ( Army Air Forces, 4 April 1944 – 18 September 1947)
- Type: Numbered Air Force
- Role: Provide launch-ready nuclear ICBMs for U.S. Strategic Command
- Part of: Air Force Global Strike Command; U.S. Strategic Command
- Headquarters: Francis E. Warren Air Force Base, Wyoming, U.S.
- Engagements: World War II – American Theater World War II – Asiatic-Pacific Theater Korean War

- Decorations: Air Force Outstanding Unit Award
- Website: 20af.af.mil

Commanders
- Commander: Maj Gen Colin J. Connor
- Deputy Commander: Col George L. Chapman
- Command Chief Master: CCM Jeffery D. Sipos
- Notable commanders: Curtis LeMay

The Twentieth Air Force (Air Forces Strategic) (20th AF) is a numbered air force of the United States Air Force Global Strike Command (AFGSC). It is headquartered at Francis E. Warren Air Force Base, Wyoming.

20 AF's primary mission is intercontinental ballistic missile (ICBM) operations. The Twentieth Air Force commander is also the Commander, Task Force 214 (TF 214), which provides alert ICBMs to the United States Strategic Command (USSTRATCOM).

Established on 4 April 1944 at Washington D.C, 20 AF was a United States Army Air Forces combat air force deployed to the Pacific Theater of World War II. Operating initially from bases in India and staging through bases in China, 20 AF conducted strategic bombardment of the Japanese Home Islands. It relocated to the Mariana Islands in late 1944, and continued the strategic bombardment campaign against Japan until the Japanese capitulation in August 1945. The 20 AF 509th Composite Group conducted the atomic attacks on Hiroshima and Nagasaki in August 1945, and remains as the only air force organization to have used a nuclear weapon in combat.

Inactivated on 1 March 1955, the command was reactivated 1 September 1991, as a component of the Strategic Air Command (SAC) and became operationally responsible for all land-based Intercontinental Ballistic Missiles.

== History ==
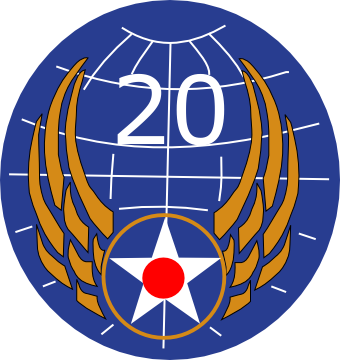

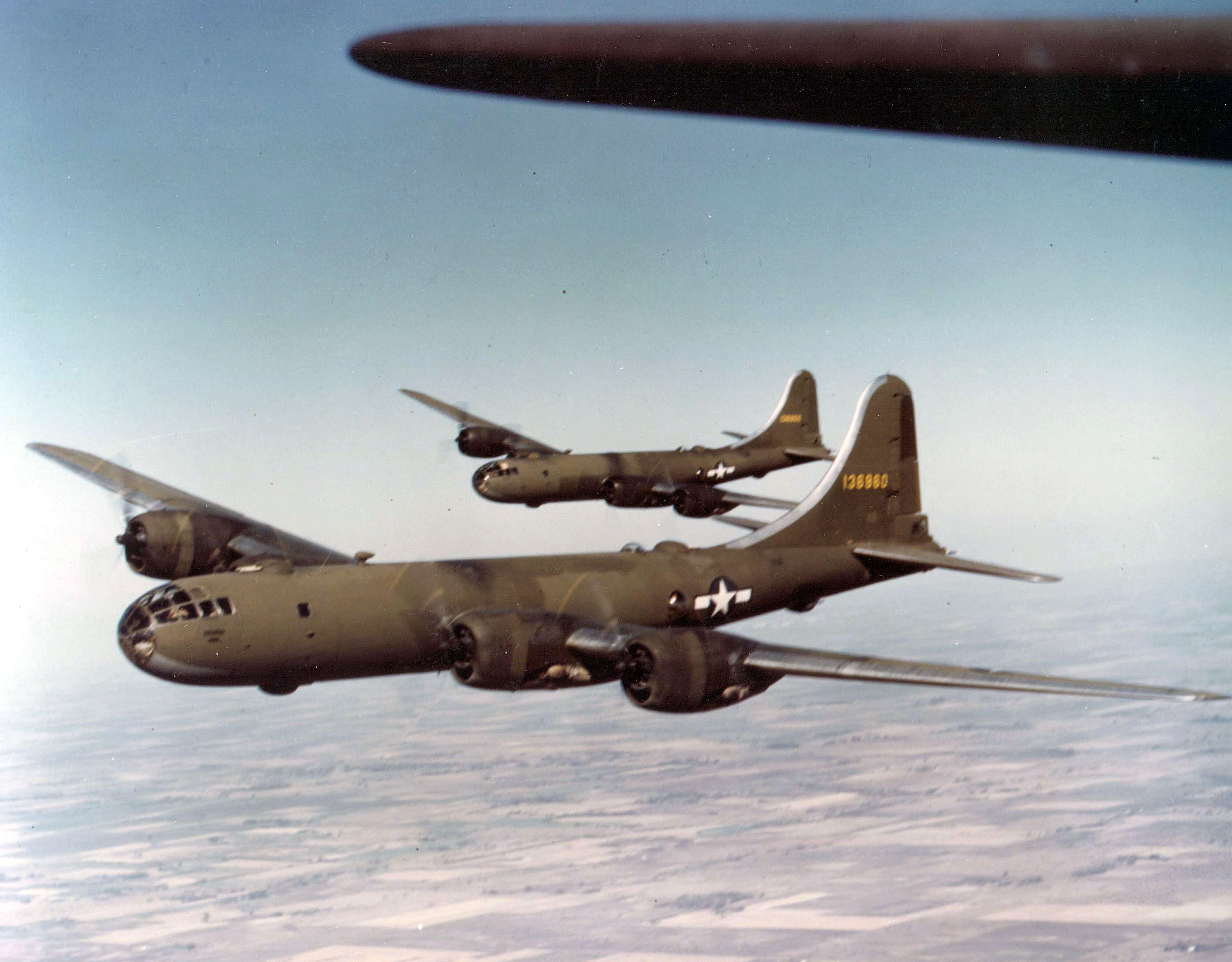
Pre-production Boeing YB-29 Superfortresses in formation

The Twentieth Air Force was brought into existence on 4 April 1944 specifically to perform strategic bombardment missions against Japan. This was done at the insistence of General Henry H. (Hap) Arnold, commander of the USAAF, mainly to avoid having the new B-29 Superfortress being diverted to tactical missions under pressure from the China Burma India Theater commanders. Twentieth Air Force was to be commanded by General Arnold himself at Joint Chiefs of Staff level. Twentieth Air Force was completely autonomous and its B-29s were to be completely independent of other command structures and would be dedicated exclusively against strategic targets in Japan.

In addition Twentieth Air Force was chosen (secretly) to be the operational component of the Manhattan Project in 1944, and performed the atomic attacks on Japan in August 1945. However, in early 1944, the B-29 was not yet operationally ready. The aircraft had been in development at Boeing since the late 1930s and the first XB-29 (41-0002) flew on 21 September 1942. However, the aircraft suffered from an overwhelming number of development issues, and with engine problems (fires). As a result, most of the first production B-29s were still held up at Air Technical Service Command modification centers, awaiting modifications and conversion to full combat readiness. By March 1944, the B-29 modification program had fallen into complete chaos, with absolutely no bombers being considered as combat ready. The program was seriously hampered by the need to work in the open air in inclement weather, as many hangars were simply too small to house the aircraft indoors; by delays in acquiring the necessary tools and support equipment, and by the USAAF's general lack of experience with the B-29.

General Arnold became alarmed at the situation and directed that his assistant, Major General B. E. Meyer, personally take charge of the entire modification program. The resulting burst of activity that took place between 10 March and 15 April 1944 came to be known as the "Battle of Kansas". Beginning in mid-March, technicians and specialists from the Boeing Wichita and Seattle factories were drafted into the modification centers to work around the clock to get the B-29s ready for combat. The mechanics often had to work outdoors in freezing weather. As a result of superhuman efforts on the part of all concerned, 150 B-29s had been handed over to the XX Bomber Command by 15 April 1944.

=== World War II operations ===
==== Operations from CBI Theater ====
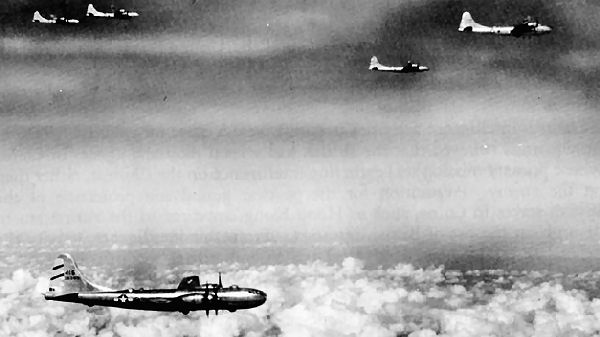
B-29s of the 58th Bomb Wing on a mission to Rangoon, Burma, 1944

Operation Matterhorn was the name for the B-29 Superfortress offensive against the Empire of Japan from airfields in China. On 10 April 1944, the Joint Chiefs of Staff (JCS) informally approved Operation Matterhorn. The operational vehicle was to be the 58th Bombardment Wing (Very Heavy) of the XX Bomber Command.

The headquarters of the XX Bomber Command had been established at Kharagpur India on 28 March 1944. The commander was General Kenneth B. Wolfe. The first B-29 reached its base in India on 2 April 1944. In India, existing airfields at Kharagpur, Chakulia, Piardoba and Dudkhundi had been converted for B-29 use. All of these bases were located in southern Bengal and were not far from port facilities at Calcutta.

The first B-29 bombing raid from India took place on 5 June 1944. Ninety-eight B-29s took off from bases in eastern India to attack the Makasan railroad yards at Bangkok, Thailand. Bombardment operations against Japan were planned to be carried out from bases in China. There were four sites in the Chengtu area of China that were assigned to the B-29 operation—at Kwanghan, Kuinglai, Hsinching, and Pengshan. The primary flaw in the Operation Matterhorn plan was that all the supplies of fuel, bombs, and spares needed to support the forward bases in China had to be flown in from India over the Hump, since Japanese control of the seas around the Chinese coast made seaborne supply of China impossible.

By mid-June, enough supplies had been stockpiled at Chinese forward bases to permit the launching of a single attack against targets in Japan. It was a nighttime raid to be carried out on the night of 14/15 June 1944 against the Imperial Iron and Steel Works at Yawata on Kyūshū. Unfortunately, the Japanese had been warned of the approaching raid and the city of Yawata was blacked out and haze and/or smoke helped to obscure the target. Only 15 aircraft bombed visually while 32 bombed by radar. Only one bomb actually hit anywhere near the intended target, and the steel industry was essentially untouched. Although very little damage was actually done, the Yawata raid was hailed as a great victory in the American press, since it was the first time since the Doolittle Raid of April 1942 that American aircraft had hit the Japanese home islands.

On the night 10–11 August, 56 B-29s staged through British air bases in Ceylon attacked the Plajdoe oil storage facilities at Palembang on Sumatra in Indonesia. This involved a 4030-mile, 19-hour mission from Ceylon to Sumatra, the longest American air raid of the war. Other B-29s laid mines in the Moesi River. At the same time, a third batch of B-29s attacked targets in Nagasaki. These raids all showed a lack of operational control and inadequate combat techniques, drifting from target to target without a central plan and were largely ineffective.

In Washington, it was decided that new leadership was needed for Twentieth Air Force. General Wolfe's replacement was Major General Curtis LeMay, who arrived in India on 29 August. Supply problems and aircraft accidents were still preventing a fully effective concentration of force and effort. In addition, Japanese defensive efforts were becoming more effective.

By late 1944, it was becoming apparent that B-29 operations against Japan staged out of bases in China and India were far too expensive in men and materials and would have to be stopped. In December 1944, the Joint Chiefs of Staff made the decision that Operation Matterhorn would be phased out, and the 58th Bombardment Wing's B-29s would be moved to newly captured bases in the Marianas in the central Pacific. The last raid out of China was flown on 15 January 1945, which was an attack on targets in Formosa (Taiwan). The 58th Bombardment Wing then redeployed to new bases in the Marianas in February.

==== Attacks on Japan from the Marianas ====
See: XXI Bomber Command for expanded history

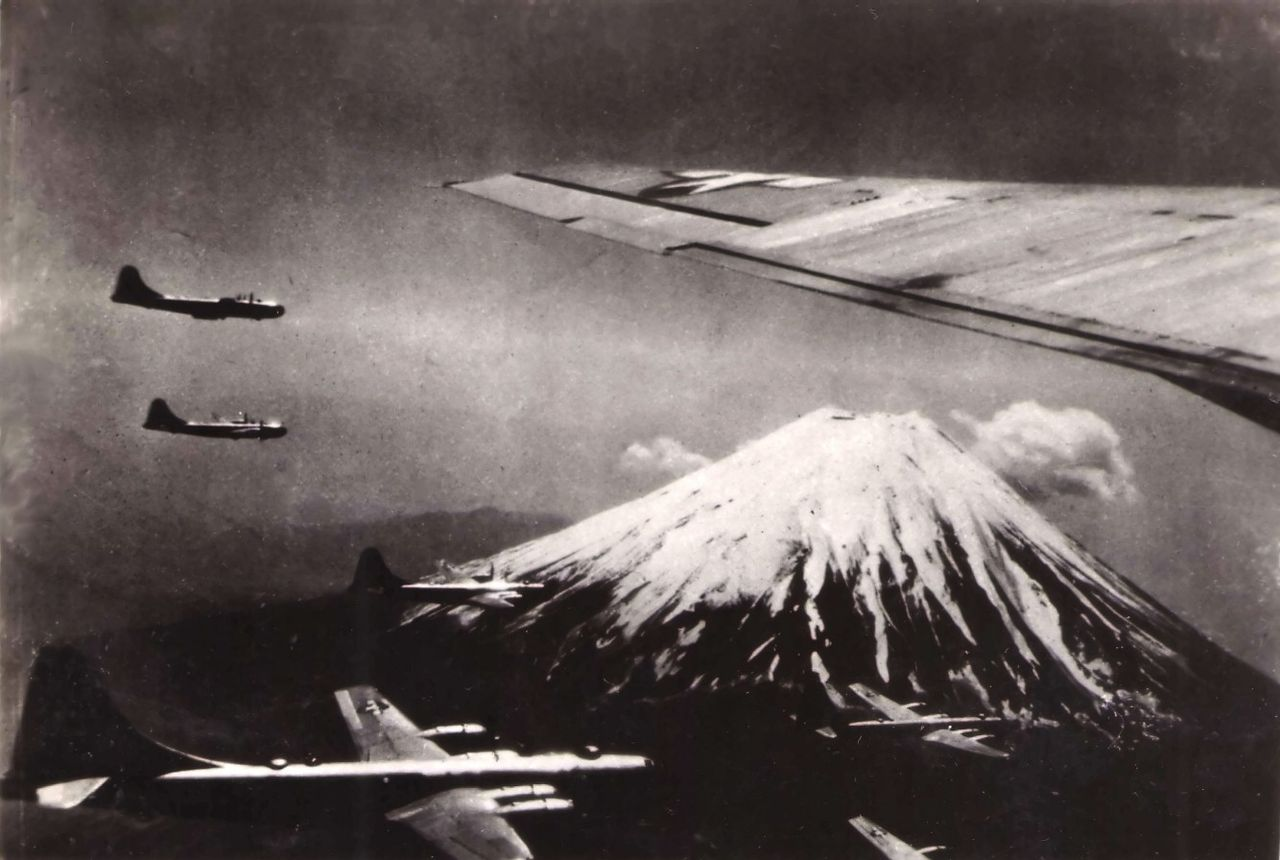
73d Bombardment Wing, 498th Bombardment Group B-29s flying near Mount Fuji, Japan, 1945

The Marianas chain of islands, consisting primarily of Saipan, Tinian, and Guam, were considered as being ideal bases from which to launch B-29 Superfortress operations against Japan. The islands were about 1500 miles from Tokyo, a range which the B-29s could just about manage. Most important of all, they could be put on a direct supply line from the United States by ship. The XXI Bombardment Command had been assigned the overall responsibility of the B-29 operations out of the Marianas bases.

The first B-29 arrived on Saipan on 12 October 1944. It was piloted by General Hansell himself. By 22 November, over 100 B-29s were on Saipan. The XXI Bomber Command was assigned the task of destroying the aircraft industry of Japan in a series of high-altitude, daylight precision attacks.

The first raid against Japan took place on 24 November 1944. The target was the Nakajima Aircraft Company's Musashi engine plant just outside Tokyo. 111 B-29s took off, Seventeen of them had to abort due to the usual spate of engine failures. The remainder approached the target at altitudes of 27–32,000 feet. For the first time, the B-29 encountered the jet stream, which was a high-speed wind coming out of the west at speeds as high as 200 mph at precisely the altitudes at which the bombers were operating. This caused the bomber formations to be disrupted and made accurate bombing impossible.

Concerned about the relative failure of the B-29 offensive to deal any crippling blows to Japan, General LeMay issued a new directive on 19 February. General LeMay had analyzed the structure of the Japanese economy, which depended heavily on cottage industries housed in cities close to major industrial areas. By destroying these feeder industries, the flow of vital components to the central plants could be slowed, disorganizing production of weapons vital to Japan. He decided to do this by using incendiary bombs rather than purely high-explosive bombs, which would, it was hoped, cause general conflagrations in large cities like Tokyo or Nagoya, spreading to some of the priority targets.

The first raid to use these new techniques was on the night of 9–10 March against Tokyo. Another wing—the 314th Bombardment Wing (19th, 29th, 39th, and 330th BG) commanded by Brig. Gen. Thomas S. Power—had arrived in the Marianas and was stationed at North Field on Guam. A total of 302 B-29s participated in the raid, with 279 arriving over the target. The raid was led by special pathfinder crews who marked central aiming points. It lasted for two hours. The raid was a success beyond General LeMay's wildest expectations. The individual fires caused by the bombs joined to create a general conflagration due to strong winds of some 17 to 28 mph (27 to 45 km/h) at ground level, that prevented a more specific firestorm event. When it was over, sixteen square miles (41 km^{2}.) of the center of Tokyo had gone up in flames and nearly 84,000 people had been killed. Fourteen B-29s were lost. The B-29 was finally beginning to have an effect.

By mid-June, most of the larger Japanese cities had been gutted, and LeMay ordered new incendiary raids against 58 smaller Japanese cities. By now, the B-29 raids were essentially unopposed by Japanese fighters. In late June, B-29 crews felt sufficiently confident that they began to drop leaflets warning the population of forthcoming attacks, followed three days later by a raid in which the specified urban area was devastated. By the end of June, the civilian population began to show signs of panic, and the Imperial Cabinet first began to consider negotiating an end to the war. However, at that time, the Japanese military was adamant about continuing on to the bitter end.

In June 1945, the XX and XXI Bombardment Commands were grouped under the U.S. Strategic Air Forces in the Pacific (USASTAF), under the command of General Carl A. Spaatz. The history of XXI Bomber Command terminated on 16 July 1945. On that date the command was redesignated Headquarters and Headquarters Squadron, Twentieth Air Force. This redesignation brought to an end the XXI Bomber Command as a separate establishment, as it was absorbed into the internal organizational structure of Twentieth Air Force and was placed under the command of USASTAF.

==== Strategic Air Forces in the Pacific operations ====
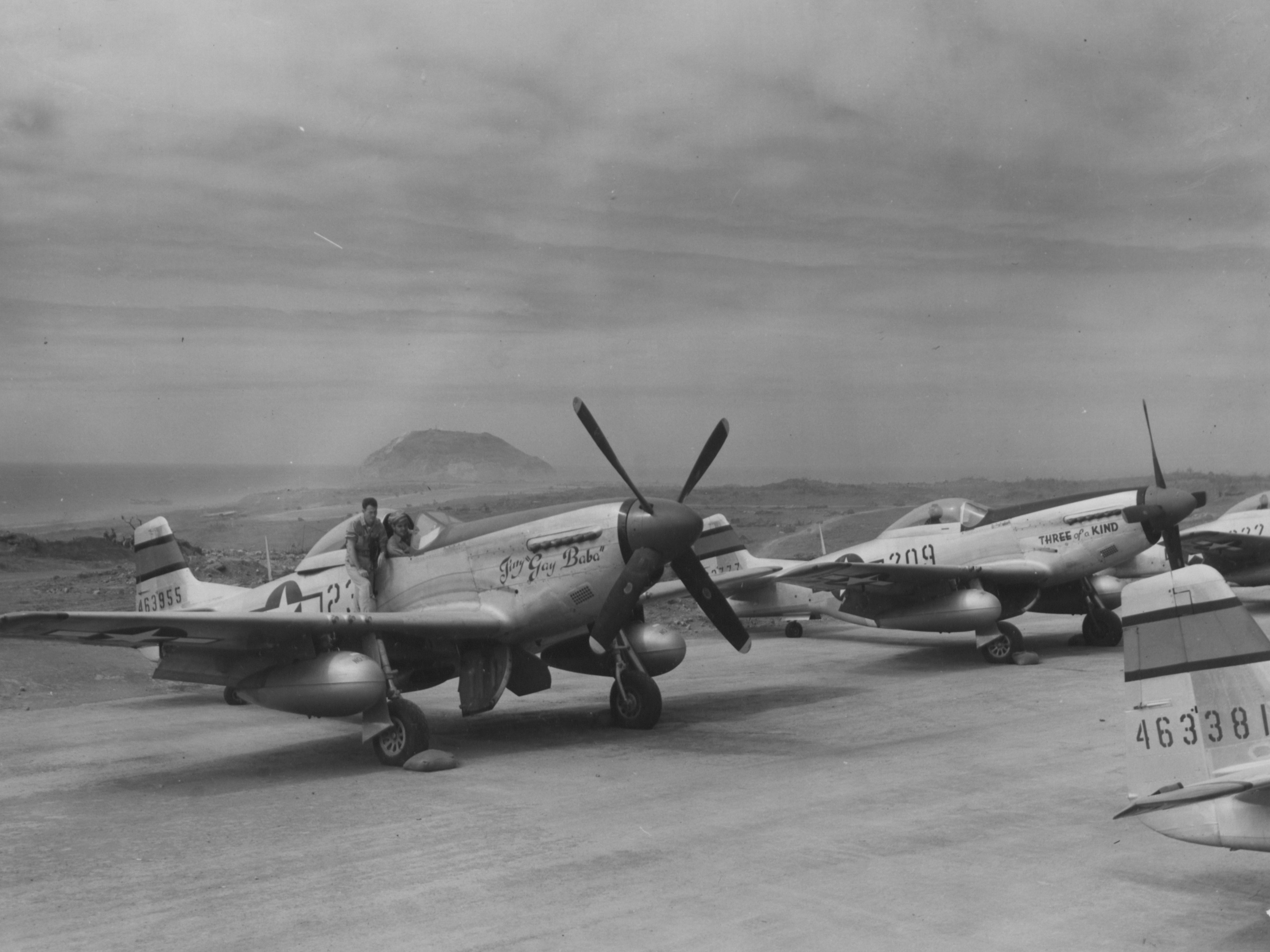
P-51Ds of the 21st Fighter Group at North Field, Iwo Jima 1945, Note Mount Suribachi in the background.

See: United States Strategic Air Forces in the Pacific and Atomic bombings of Hiroshima and Nagasaki for expanded history

A reorganization of United States military commands on 16 July 1945 placed Twentieth Air Force under the command and control of the new United States Strategic Air Forces in the Pacific. Twentieth Air Force would command B-29 wings directly based in the Mariana Islands, while the newly re-deployed Eighth Air Force would command B-29 wings based on Okinawa. This realignment was made in advance of the planned Invasion of Japan (Operation Downfall) set to begin in October 1945. XXI Bomber Command was inactivated, its organization under the direct control of Twentieth Air Force.

By mid-July 1945, the combat missions over Japan were essentially un-opposed, with VII Fighter Command long range P-51 Mustangs operating from captured Iwo Jima airfields flying escort to the Marianas-based B-29s. Missions primarily consisted of low-level incendiary raids on smaller Japanese cities, both at night as well as daylight on a daily basis. The 315th Bombardment Wing, which became operational at the beginning of July, carried out a series of strikes against oil production facilities which essentially shut down the Japanese oil industry.

===== 509th Composite Group =====
See: 509th Composite Group for expanded history

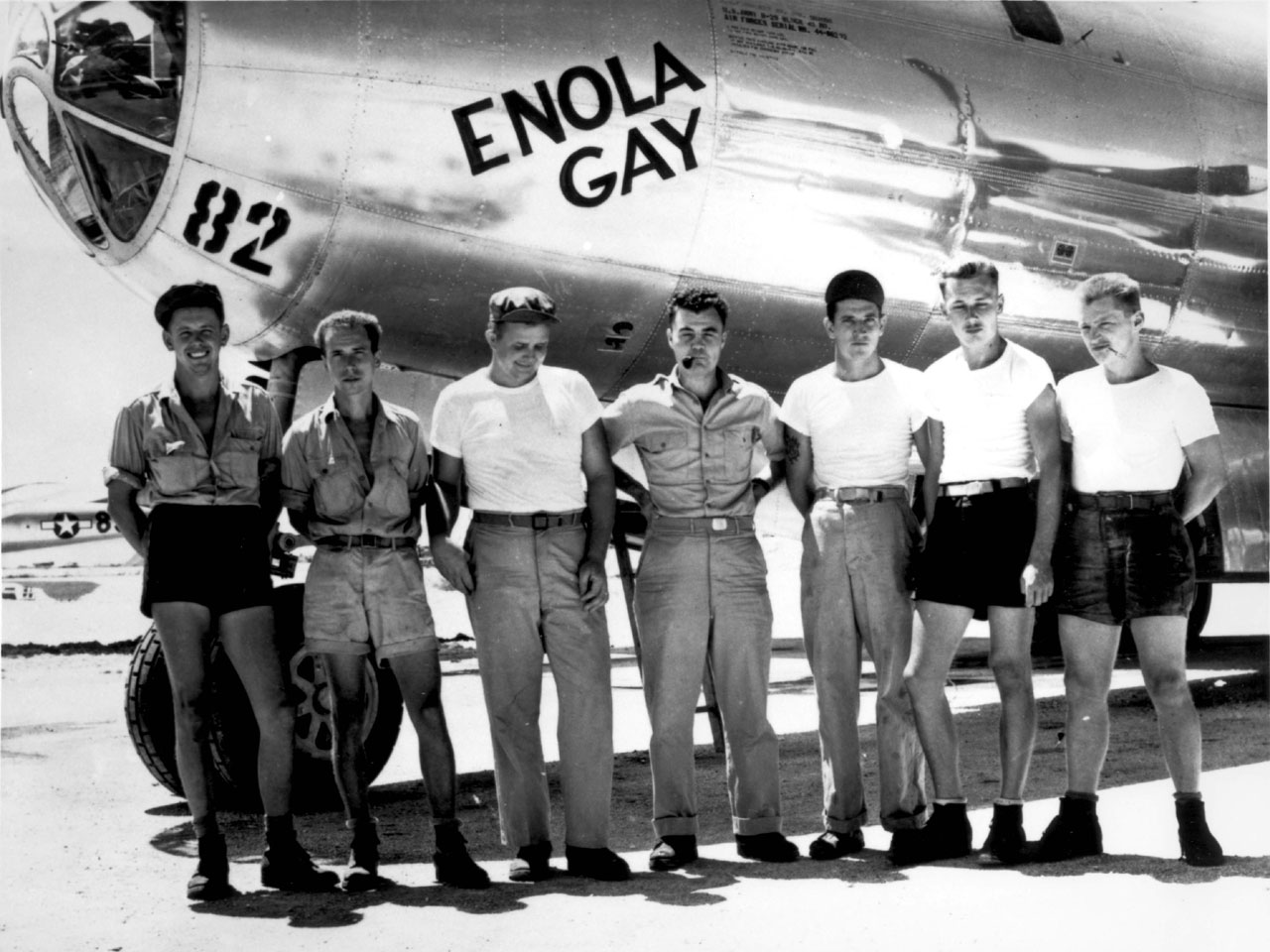
Enola Gay, captain Paul Tibbets and members of the ground crew

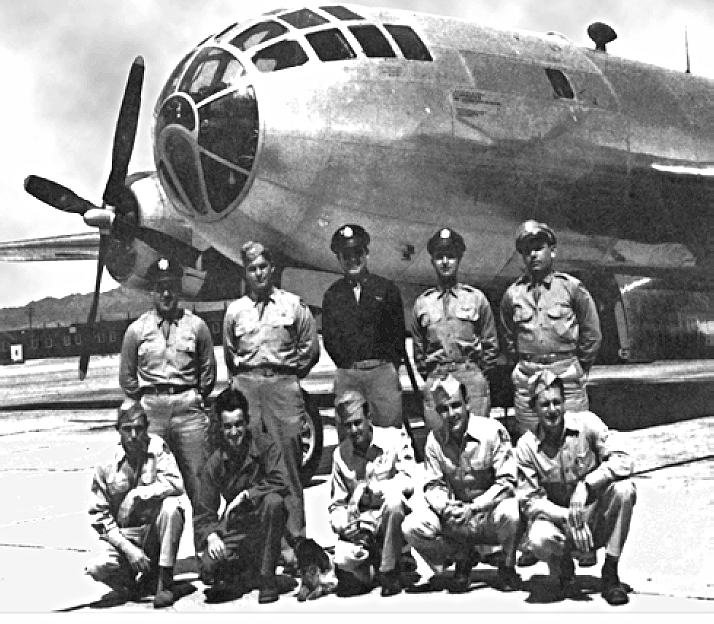
Flight crew of the Bockscar

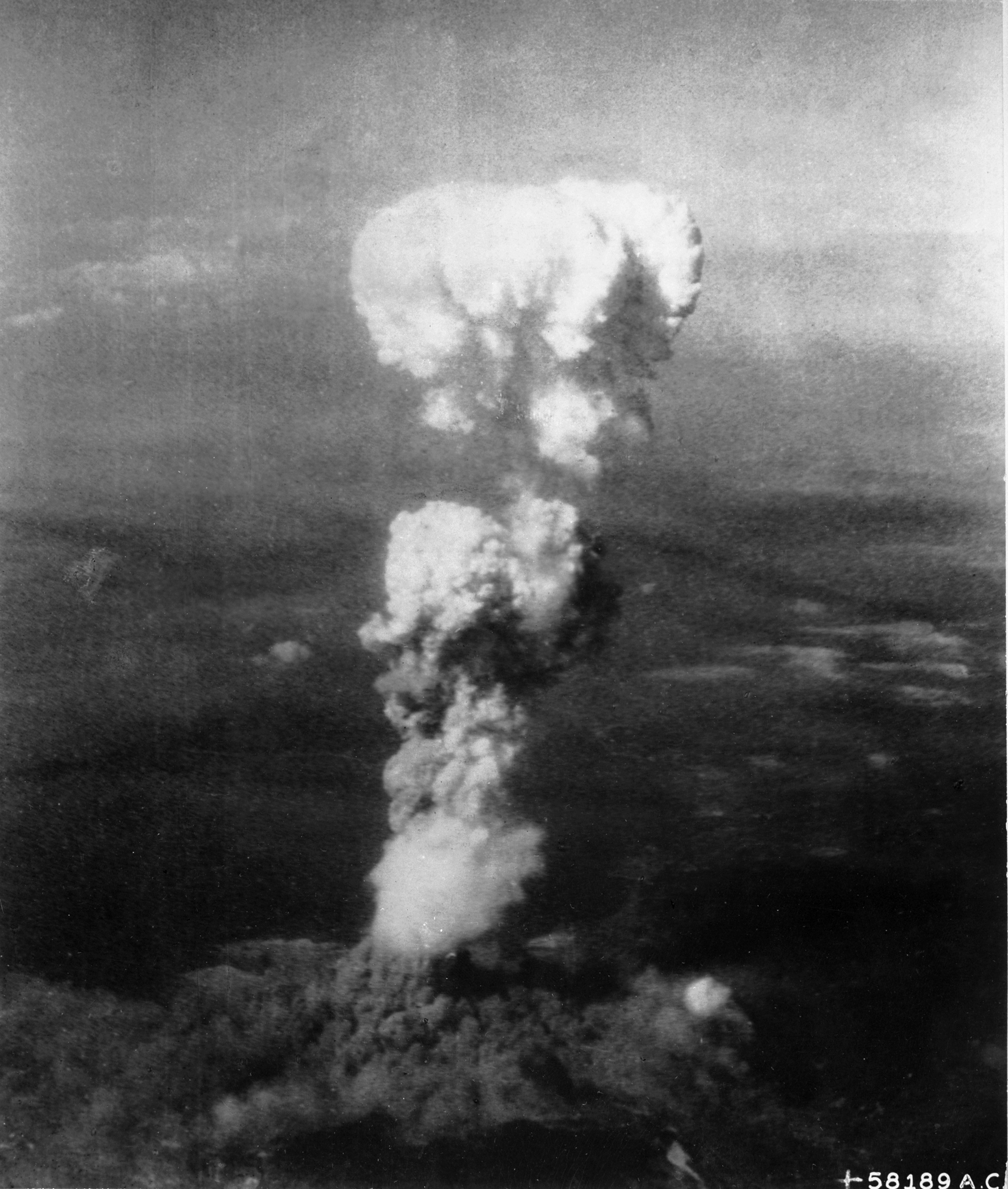
The mushroom cloud over Hiroshima after the dropping of Little Boy

The 509th Composite Group was deployed overseas in the spring of 1945. The 509th was initially a part of XXI Bombardment Command based in the Marianas. By July, the bombers were established at North Field on Tinian, which had just been completed for the 313th Bombardment Wing. It was, however, under the direct operational control of the commander, Twentieth Air Force. The mission of the unit was the operational use of the Atomic Bomb.

It had only one Bombardment Squadron—the 393rd, commanded by Major Charles W. Sweeney. The 509th Composite Group was a completely self-sufficient unit, with its own engineer, material, and troop squadrons as well as its own military police unit. Since the Manhattan Project was carried out in an atmosphere of high secrecy, the vast majority of the officers and men of the 509th Composite Group were completely ignorant of its intended mission.

With the testing of the Atomic Bomb completed in the United States, the two other bombs (Little Boy, Fat Man) had arrived on Tinian on 26 July, being delivered by the USS Indianapolis (CA-35). On 24 July, a directive was sent to General Carl A. Spaatz ordering the 509th to deliver its first atomic bomb as soon as weather would permit. The Japanese cities of Hiroshima, Kokura, Niigata and Nagasaki were potential targets. President Harry S. Truman gave his final go-ahead from the Potsdam Conference on 31 July.

On 6 August the atomic attack began with a flight of three special reconnaissance F-13As (RB-29s) which took off to report the weather over the primary and secondary targets. Col. Tibbets followed in his B-29 aircraft, Enola Gay, an hour later, accompanied by two other B-29s which would observe the drop. While on the way to Japan, Major Claude Eatherly, flying Straight Flush, radioed that Hiroshima was clear for a visual bomb drop. Navy weapons expert Captain William Parsons armed the bomb while in flight, as it was deemed too dangerous to do this on the ground at North Field, lest an accident happen and the bomb go off, wiping out the entire base. At 8:15 am, the Enola Gay released Little Boy from an altitude of 31,500 feet (9,600 m). The radar fuse on the bomb had been preset to go off at an altitude of 2,000 feet (610 m) above the ground. In the ensuing explosion, yielding about 12 kilotons of TNT in explosive power, about 75,000 people were killed and 48,000 buildings were destroyed.

With no official statement from the Japanese government, there was no let-up with the conventional B-29 raids. B-29s from the 58th, 73rd, and 313th Bombardment Wings hit the Toyokawa Arsenal the next day. On the night of 7 August, the 525th Bombardment Group dropped 189 tons of mines on several different sea targets. On 8 August, the 58th, 73rd, and 313th Bomb Wings dropped incendiary bombs on targets at Yawata in the southern island of Kyūshū. At the same time, the 314th BW hit an industrial area of Tokyo. The Japanese defenses were still effective enough to down four B-29s during the Yawata raid and three at Tokyo.

Since there was still no official reaction from Japan, the Americans felt that there was no alternative but to prepare a second atomic attack. The plutonium bomb called "Fat Man" was loaded into a B-29 known as Bockscar (Martin-Omaha built B-29-35-MO serial number 44-27297, the name often spelled Bock's Car), named after its usual commander, Captain Frederick C. Bock. However, on this mission, the aircraft was flown by Major Sweeney, with Capt. Bock flying one of the observation planes. The primary target was to be the Kokura Arsenal, with the seaport city of Nagasaki as the alternative.

Bockscar took off on 9 August, with Fat Man on board. This time, the primary target of Kokura was obscured by dense smoke left over from the earlier B-29 raid on nearby Yawata, and the bombardier could not pinpoint the specified aiming point despite three separate runs. So Sweeney turned to the secondary target, Nagasaki. There were clouds over Nagasaki as well, and a couple of runs over the target had to be made before the bombardier could find an opening in the clouds. At 11:00 am, Fat Man was released from the aircraft and after a long descent, the bomb exploded. The yield was estimated at 22 kilotons of TNT. Approximately 35,000 people died at Nagasaki from the immediate blast and fire.

After releasing the bomb, Sweeney was forced to divert to Okinawa because of a problem with a fuel transfer pump, and because of the long flight with multiple bomb runs and circling for better weather. There was not even enough fuel left to fly to Iwo Jima. After refueling on Okinawa, the B-29 returned to Tinian. The Japanese Emperor ordered that the government accept the Allied terms of surrender at once. It took time for the full details to be worked out, and there was a very real danger that some elements of the Japanese military would still not accept surrender, and might attempt a military coup d'état, even against their Emperor.

In the meantime, conventional bombing of Japanese targets still continued, with a record number of 804 B-29s hitting targets in Japan on 14 August. On the morning of 15 August, the Emperor broadcast by radio his command of Japan's surrender in an address to his nation. Practically none of his subjects had never heard his voice before. All further offensive operations against Japan ceased after the Emperor's broadcast.

After that time, most of the B-29s in the Pacific were diverted to missions of mercy, dropping food and clothing to thousands of Allied prisoners of war held in Japan, China, Manchuria, and Korea. 1066 B-29s participated in 900 missions to 154 camps. Some 63,500 prisoners were provided with 4470 tons of supplies. These flights cost eight B-29s lost by accidents, with 77 crew members aboard.

The Japanese surrender was formally signed on 2 September 1945, aboard the huge battleship USS Missouri in Tokyo Bay, bringing the Pacific War to an end.

=== Postwar era ===
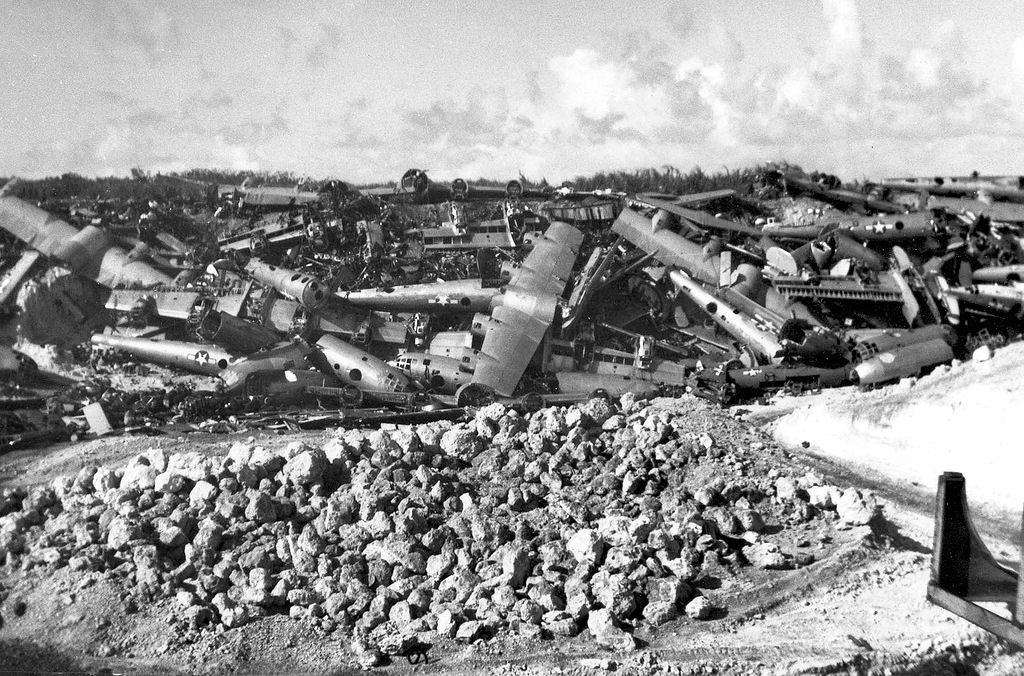
B-29 Superfortress graveyard, North Field, Tinian, 1946. During the war, bulldozers were always waiting at the ends of the runways. Any problem with takeoff or landing and the B-29's were bulldozed off the runway to keep the flow moving. After the war, many war-weary B-29s were scrapped on Tinian, the aircrews being sent home on other aircraft or ships.

Following the end of World War II, Twentieth Air Force remained in the Pacific, being headquartered on Guam. The vast majority of its fleet of B-29 Superfortreses were returned to the United States as part of "Operation Sunset". The United States Strategic Air Forces in the Pacific was inactivated on 6 December 1945, and Twentieth Air Force placed under the Pacific Air Command, United States Army.

The last of the World War II combat wings, the 315th Bombardment Wing, returned to the United States on 30 May 1946. The 19th Bombardment Group remained at North Field, Guam as its only operational group. In 1949, budget reductions forced the realignment and consolidation of Air Force units in the Pacific, and the mission of Twentieth Air Force became the defense of the Ryukyu Islands and it was reassigned to Kadena AB, Okinawa. It commanded the following units:

- Naha Air Base, Okinawa
  51st Fighter-Interceptor Wing/Group (F-80, F-82)
- Kadena Air Base, Okinawa
  31st Strategic Reconnaissance Squadron, (RB-29)
- Anderson Air Force Base, Guam
  19th Bombardment Wing/Group (B-29)

=== Korean War ===
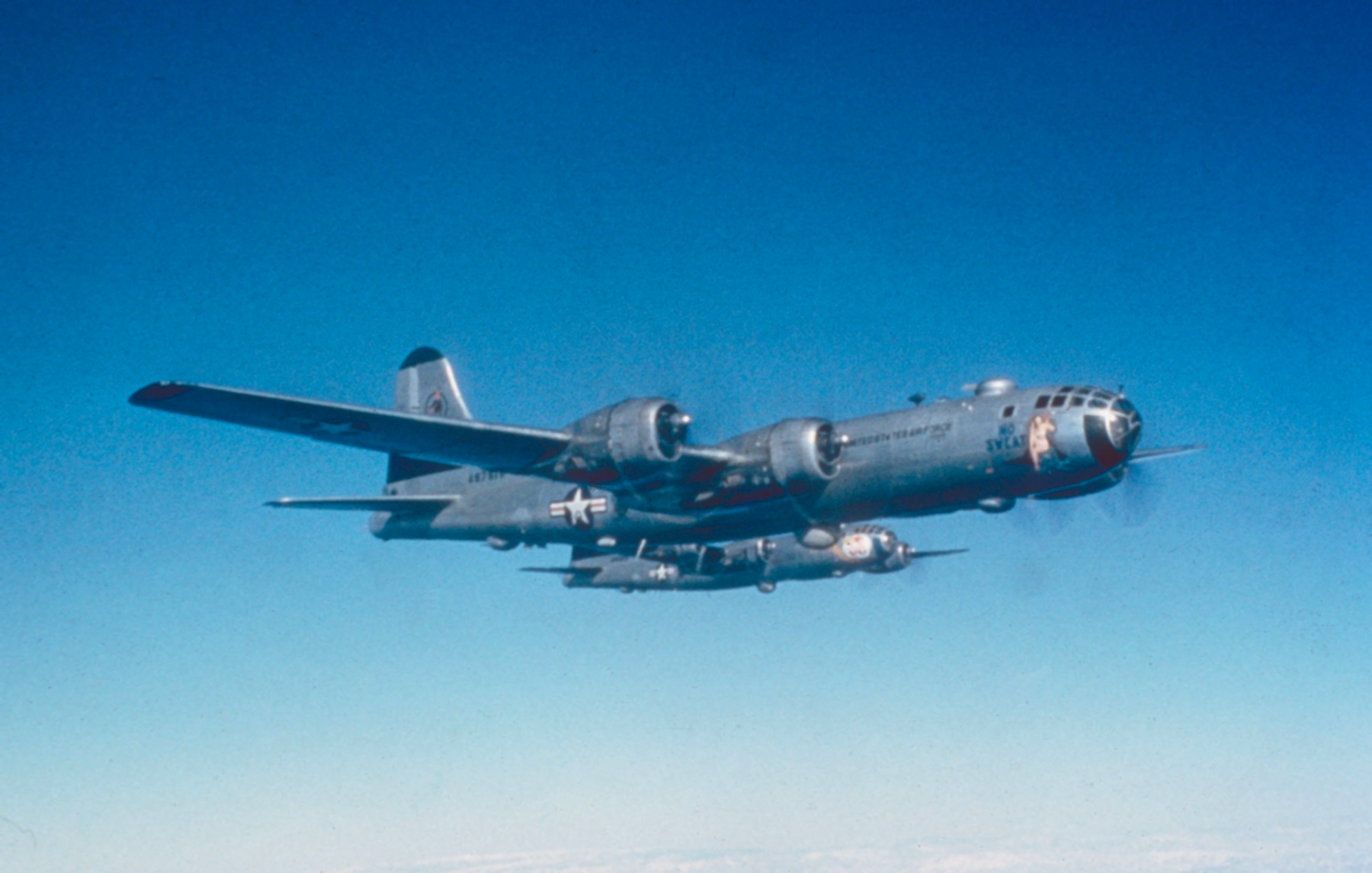
Two U.S. Air Force Boeing B-29 Superfortress bombers from the 93rd Bomb Squadron, 19th Bomb Group, during a mission over Korea in 1950. The aircraft in front is B-29-80-BW 44-70134, nicknamed "No Sweat".

On 27 June 1950, the United Nations Security Council voted to assist the South Koreans in resisting the invasion of their nation by North Korea. President Harry S. Truman authorized General Douglas MacArthur (commander of the US occupying forces in Japan) to commit units to the battle. MacArthur ordered General George E. Stratemeyer, CIC of the Far Eastern Air Force (FEAF) to attack attacking North Korean forces between the front lines and the 38th parallel. At that time, the 22 B-29s of the 19th Bombardment Group stationed at Andersen Field on Guam were the only aircraft capable of hitting the Korean peninsula, and this unit was ordered to move to Kadena air base on Okinawa and begin attacks on North Korea. These raids began on 28 June. On 29 June, clearance was given for B-29 attacks on airfields in North Korea. The B-29s were frequently diverted into tactical attacks against advancing North Korean troops.

On 8 July, a special FEAF Bomber Command was set up under the command of Major General Emmett O'Donnell. On 13 July, the FEAF Bomber Command took over command of the 19th Bombardment Group and of the 22nd and 92nd Bombardment Groups which had been transferred from SAC bases in the United States.

The other major components of Twentieth Air Force, the 51st Fighter-Interceptor Wing was reassigned to Fifth Air Force at Itazuke AB, Japan in September 1950, where its F-82 Twin Mustangs and F-80 Shooting Stars were used in combat over Korea. The very long-range RB-29s of the 31st Strategic Reconnaissance Squadron (unarmed B-29s fitted with additional internal fuel tanks within the bomb bays and various photo mapping cameras) were also reassigned to Fifth Air Force at Johnson AB, Japan where they were combined with other aerial reconnaissance units.

With the end of the Korean War in 1953, Far East Air Forces reorganized its forces and Twentieth Air Force units were reassigned. The bombardment units were reassigned to Strategic Air Command in 1954; fighter units to Fifth Air Force in 1955 and used for air defense. It was inactivated on 1 March 1955.

=== Reactivation from the 1990s ===
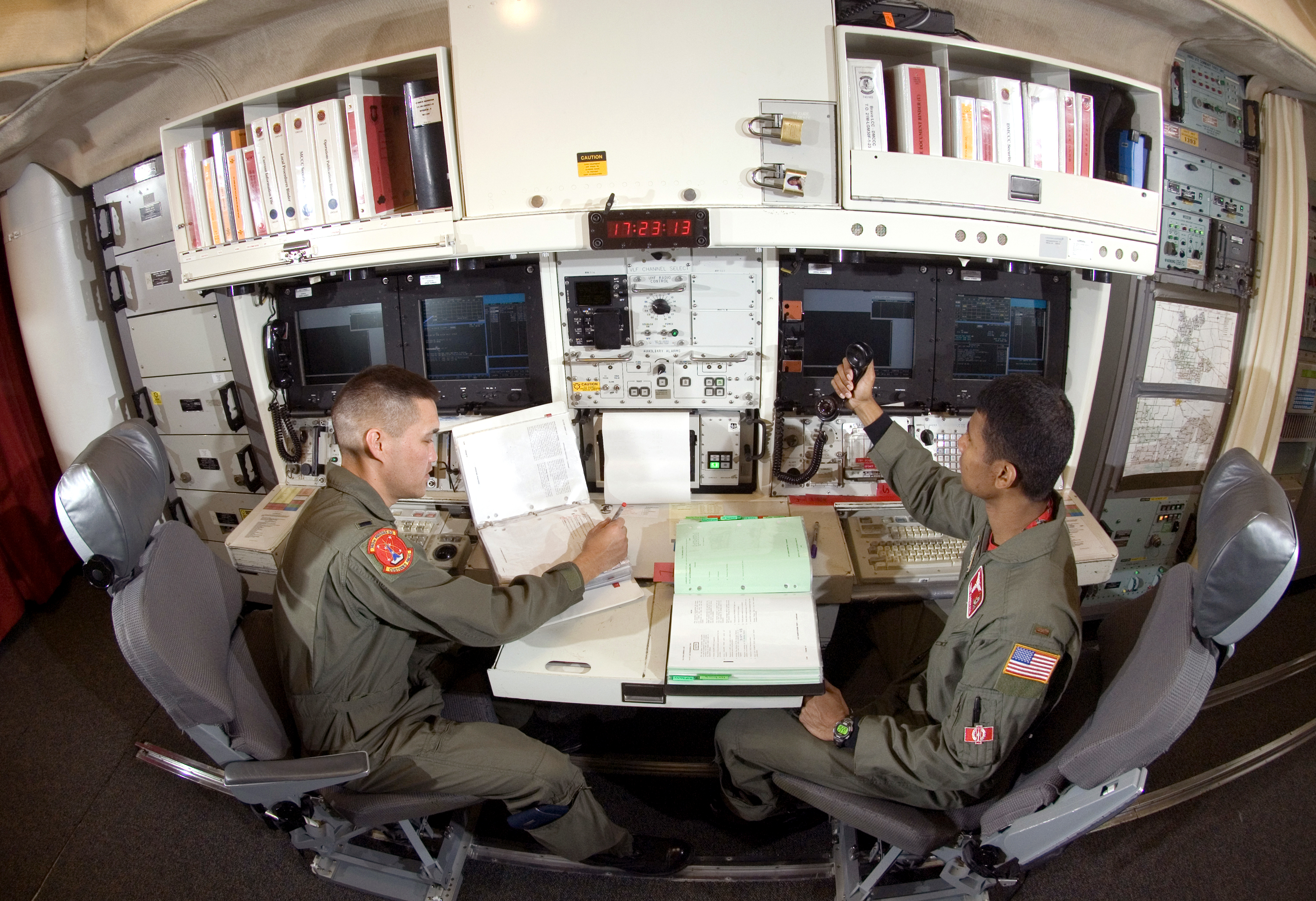
Minuteman missile combat crew in 2006.

Twentieth Air Force was reactivated on 1 September 1991 as a component of Strategic Air Command and located at Vandenberg AFB, California. Its mission was the responsibility for all land-based Intercontinental Ballistic Missiles (ICBM)s. 20th Air Force's rebirth came at a time when America's nuclear forces were entering a decade of unprecedented force reductions and changes. Spawned by the Cold War's end and the breakup of the Soviet Union, these changes reshaped the basic fabric of the nation's nuclear deterrent forces.

In the decades since its reactivation, 20th Air Force has experienced four major command identities. After one year in Strategic Air Command and another year in Air Combat Command, 20th Air Force was moved under Air Force Space Command in 1993. December 2009 marked the final transition of 20th Air Force to the newly created Air Force Global Strike Command. Twentieth Air Force Headquarters' changed its location in 1993, moving from Vandenberg AFB, Calif., to its current home at FE Warren Air Force Base, Wyoming. Today 450 Minuteman III missiles remain on alert.

=== Status in the 2020s ===
Twentieth Air Force headquarters is unique in that it has dual responsibilities to Air Force Global Strike Command and United States Strategic Command. As the missile Numbered Air Force for AFGSC, 20th Air Force is responsible for maintaining and operating the Air Force's ICBM force. Designated as STRATCOM's Task Force 214, 20th Air Force provides on-alert, combat ready ICBMs to the president.

Wings:

- Headquarters, Francis E. Warren AFB, Wyoming
- 90th Missile Wing, Francis E. Warren AFB, Wyoming
  - 319th Missile Squadron
  - 320th Missile Squadron
  - 321st Missile Squadron
- 91st Missile Wing, Minot AFB, Minot, North Dakota
  - 740th Missile Squadron
  - 741st Missile Squadron
  - 742nd Missile Squadron
- 341st Missile Wing, Malmstrom AFB, Montana
  - 10th Missile Squadron
  - 12th Missile Squadron
  - 490th Missile Squadron
- 582nd Helicopter Group, Francis E. Warren AFB, Wyoming
  - 582nd Operations Support Squadron
  - 37th Helicopter Squadron
  - 40th Helicopter Squadron
  - 54th Helicopter Squadron
- 377th Air Base Wing – Kirtland AFB, New Mexico
- 625th Strategic Operations Squadron – Offutt AFB, Nebraska

== Lineage ==
- Established as Twentieth Air Force and activated on 4 April 1944

Inactivated on 1 March 1955

- Activated on 1 September 1991.

Redesignated as: Twentieth Air Force (Air Forces Strategic) on 1 December 2009.

=== Assignments ===
- United States Army Air Forces, 4 April 1944

Attached to United States Strategic Air Forces in the Pacific, 16 July-6 December 1945

- Pacific Air Command, U.S. Army, (later Far East Air Forces), 6 December 1945 – 1 March 1955
- Strategic Air Command, 1 September 1991
- Air Combat Command, 1 June 1992
- Air Force Space Command, 1 July 1993
- Air Force Global Strike Command, 7 August 2009

=== Components ===
==== World War II ====
- VII Fighter Command, 5 Aug 1945-c. Aug 1946
- XX Bomber Command, 19 April 1944 – 18 July 1945
- XXI Bomber Command, 9 November 1944 – 18 July 1945

Assumed direct control of XXI Bomber Command organization, 16 July 1945

58th Bombardment Wing, 29 Jun-12 Oct 1944; 16 July 1945 – 15 November 1945
73d Bombardment Wing, 16 July 1945 – 13 March 1946
313th Bombardment Wing, 16 July 1945 – 13 March 1946
314th Bombardment Wing, 16 July 1945 – 15 May 1946
315th Bombardment Wing, 16 July 1945 – 30 May 1946

- 301st Fighter Wing, 21 May 1945 – 29 November 1945

Detached 21 May 1945 – 14 August 1945

- 3d Photographic Reconnaissance Squadron

Attached to: Twentieth Air Force, 1 November 1944
Attached to: XXI Bomber Command, December 1944
Attached to: Twentieth Air Force, 16 July 1945
Assigned to: Twentieth Air Force, 3 February–15 March 1947

==== United States Air Force ====
Bombardment Wings

- 19th Bombardment Wing, 17 August 1948 – 16 May 1949, 17 October 1949 – 11 June 1954

Detached 1 Jun 1953 – c. 28 May 1954

- 98th Bombardment Wing (Attached 18 Jun-25 Jul 1954)
- 307th Bombardment Wing (Attached 18 Jun-19 Nov 1954)

Fighter Wings

- 18th Fighter-Bomber Wing, 10 November 1954 – 31 January 1955
- 23d Fighter Wing, 16 August 1948 – 25 April 1949
- 51st Fighter Wing, 16 May 1949 – 1 March 1955

Detached 25 Sep-12 Oct 1950

Missile Wings

- 44th Missile Wing, 1 September 1991 – 5 July 1994
- 90th Missile (later, 90th Space) Wing, 1 September 1991 – present
- 91st Missile (later, 91st Missile Group; 91st Missile Wing; 91st Space Wing, 91st Missile Wing); 1 September 1991 – present
- 321st Missile Wing (later, 321st Missile Group), 1 September 1991 – 2 July 1998
- 341st Missile (later, 341st Space) Wing, 1 September 1991 – present
- 351st Missile Wing, 1 September 1991 – 31 July 1995

Other Wings and Groups

- 529th Aircraft Control & Warning Group – 16 May 1949 – 1 August 1952
- 310th Training and Test Wing 1 September 1991 – 1 July 1993
- 374th Troop Carrier Wing, (Attached 17 August 1948 – 5 March 1949).
- 377th Air Base Wing, 1 Oct 2015–present
- 582d Helicopter Group, early 2015–present

=== Stations ===
- Washington, D.C., 4 April 1944
- Harmon Field, Guam, Mariana Islands, July 1945
- Kadena Air Base, Okinawa, 16 May 1949 – 1 March 1955
- Vandenberg Air Force Base, California, 1 September 1991 – 1993
- Francis E. Warren Air Force Base, Wyoming, 1993 – present

== List of commanders ==
=== 1944 to 1955 ===
No.	Commander		Term		
No.	Portrait	Name	Took office	Left office	Term length
1	Henry H. Arnold	General of the Army; Henry H. Arnold	6 April 1944	15 July 1945	1 year, 100 days
2	Curtis LeMay	Major General; Curtis LeMay	16 July 1945	1 August 1945	16 days
3	Nathan F. Twining	Lieutenant General; Nathan F. Twining	2 August 1945	14 October 1945	73 days
4	James E. Parker	Major General; James E. Parker	15 October 1945	18 March 1946	154 days
5	Frederick M. Hopkins Jr.	Brigadier General; Frederick M. Hopkins Jr.	19 March 1946	9 September 1946	174 days
6	Francis H. Griswold	Major General; Francis H. Griswold	10 September 1946	7 September 1948	1 year, 363 days
7	Alvin C. Kincaid	Major General; Alvin C. Kincaid	8 September 1948	30 July 1950	1 year, 325 days
8	Ralph Francis Stearley	Major General; Ralph Francis Stearley	31 July 1950	7 February 1953	2 years, 191 days
9	Fay R. Upthegrove	Major General; Fay R. Upthegrove	8 February 1953	1 March 1955	2 years, 21 days

=== 1992 to present ===
No.	Commander		Term		
No.	Portrait	Name	Took office	Left office	Term length
1	Arlen D. Jameson	Lieutenant General; Arlen D. Jameson	1 July 1992	22 June 1994	1 year, 356 days
2	Robert W. Parker	Major General; Robert W. Parker	22 June 1994	17 June 1996	1 year, 361 days
3	Donald G. Cook	Major General; Donald G. Cook	17 June 1996	4 September 1998	2 years, 79 days
4	Thomas H. Neary	Major General; Thomas H. Neary	4 September 1998	19 July 2000	1 year, 319 days
5	Timothy J. McMahon	Major General; Timothy J. McMahon	19 July 2000	30 May 2003	2 years, 315 days
6	Frank Klotz	Major General; Frank Klotz	30 May 2003	14 October 2005	2 years, 137 days
7	Thomas F. Deppe	Major General; Thomas F. Deppe	14 October 2005	10 August 2007	1 year, 300 days
8	Roger W. Burg	Major General; Roger W. Burg	10 August 2007	1 July 2010	2 years, 325 days
9	C. Donald Alston	Major General; C. Donald Alston	1 July 2010	June 2012	~1 year, 336 days
10	Michael J. Carey	Major General; Michael J. Carey	June 2012	October 2013	~1 year, 122 days
11	Jack Weinstein	Major General; Jack Weinstein	October 2013	16 November 2015	~2 years, 46 days
12	Anthony J. Cotton	Major General; Anthony J. Cotton	16 November 2015	26 January 2018	2 years, 71 days
13	Ferdinand Stoss	Major General; Ferdinand Stoss	26 January 2018	8 July 2020	2 years, 164 days
14	Michael Lutton	Major General; Michael Lutton	8 July 2020	5 January 2024	3 years, 181 days
15	Stacy Jo Huser	Major General; Stacy Jo Huser	5 January 2024	10 Jul 2026	2 years, 186 days
16	Colin J. Connor	Major General; Colin J. Connor	10 Jul 2026	Incumbent	51 days

== See also ==
- Pacific War
- Timeline WW II – Pacific Theatre
- South-East Asian Theatre of World War II
- United States Strategic Command
- Bombing of Tokyo in World War II
- United States strategic bombing of Japan
- Bombing of Kobe in World War II
- Firebombing
