= Harmon Air Force Base =

World War II installation on Guam

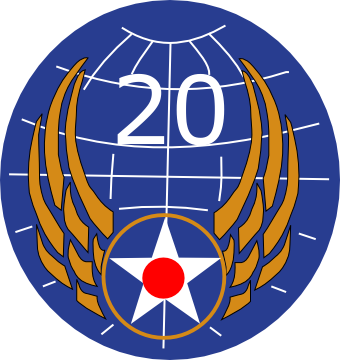
Harmon Air Force Base Depot Field
- Part of Twentieth Air Force (FEAF)
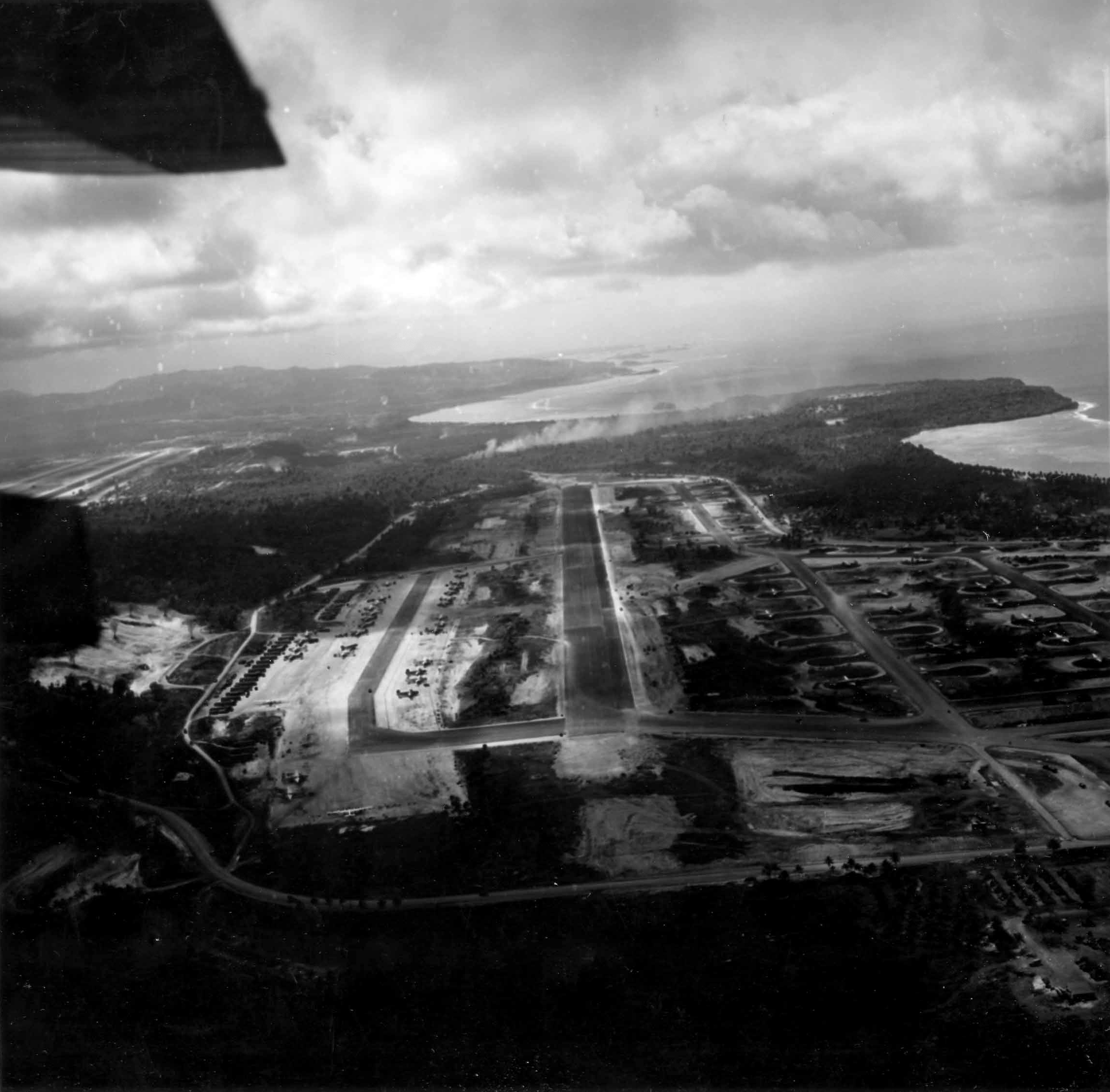
- Harmon Field, Guam, January 1945

Site information
- Type: Military airfield
- Controlled by: United States Army Air Forces; United States Air Force

Location
- Coordinates: 13°30′0″N 144°48′30″E

Site history
- Built: 1944
- Built by: 25th Seabees
- In use: 1944–1949

Harmon Air Force Base is a former World War II United States Army Air Forces airfield, and postwar United States Air Force Base on Guam in the Mariana Islands. Originally named "Depot Field", it was renamed in honor of Lieutenant General Millard F. Harmon. Harmon Air Force Base was closed in 1949 due to budget constraints and was merged with the neighboring Naval Air Station Agana.

== History ==
Harmon Field was built by CB 25 as the headquarters for the XXI Bomber Command and later Twentieth Air Force which directed the B-29 Superfortress strategic bombing campaign against the Japanese Home Islands. It was also the major B-29 aircraft depot and maintenance facility in the Western Pacific during the war, and that mission continued for Far East Air Forces until its closure.

Harmon was used operationally by the United States Air Force 11th Bombardment Group as an operational B-29 Base. After the war the 9th Bombardment Group used the base for strategic reconnaissance missions and the 374th Troop Carrier Group of the Technical Service Command used the base for transport of supplies and equipment from its depot facilities. Harmon Air Force Base was closed in 1949 due to budget constraints and was merged with the neighboring Naval Air Station Agana.

Today, the technical facilities are an industrial area to the northeast of the Antonio B. Won Pat International Airport, which served as the main airfield for both Harmon Air Force Base and Naval Air Station Agana.

== Major units assigned ==
- 1537th Army Air Forces Base Unit, 30 September 1944 – 1 August 1945
- 75th Air Service Group, 1 May 1947 – 20 September 1948
- 367th Air Service Group, 1 May 1947 – 1 November 1949
- Guam Air Depot (later Guam Air Materiel Area, Marianas Air Materiel Area)

56th Air Depot Group, Air Technical Service Command, 9 November 1944 – 31 August 1945
24th Air Depot Group, Air Technical Service Command, 8 November 1944 – 1 July 1949
55th Air Depot Group, Air Technical Service Command, 1 January 1945 – 21 December 1945
25th Air Depot Group, Air Technical Service Command, 21 January 1945 – 1 November 1949

- XXI Bomber Command, 4 December 1944 – 16 July 1945
- Twentieth Air Force, 16 July 1945 – 16 May 1949
- Western Pacific Wing, Air Transport Command, 10 April 1946 – 1 March 1947
- 11th Bombardment Group (Very Heavy), 15 May 1946 – 20 October 1948
- 9th Bombardment Group (Very Heavy), 9 June 1947 – 20 October 1948
- 374th Troop Carrier Group, 1 April 1947 – 5 March 1949
- 3d Reconnaissance Squadron (Very Long Range, Photographic), 11 January 1945 – 15 March 1947

== See also ==
- Andersen Air Force Base
- USAAF in the Central Pacific
- Naval Base Guam
