= Eric D. Brown =

USAF officer

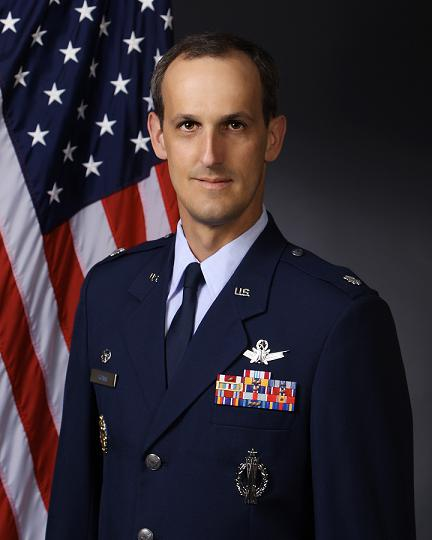
- Lieutenant Colonel Eric D. Brown
- Military career
- Allegiance: United States of America
- Branch: United States Air Force
- Rank: Lieutenant colonel
- Unit: 320th Missile Squadron
- Commands: Commander, 320th Missile Squadron

Lieutenant Colonel Eric D. Brown is a former commander of the 320th Missile Squadron at F.E. Warren Air Force Base, Wyoming.

== Biography ==
Lieutenant Colonel Brown received his commission through the Air Force Reserve Officer Training Corps in 1992. He has held various staff assignments within two wings, Headquarters Air Force Space Command, the Air Staff, and the Joint Staff, to include Chief of Space Launch Vehicles Branch, Air Force Space Command, and Chief of Strategic Guidance Branch and Political-Military Planner, Joint Staff. A three-time Guardian Challenge competitor, Lt Col Brown won the Blanchard Trophy for F.E. Warren AFB in 1996 and the Schriever Trophy for Patrick AFB in 2000. Lt Col Brown has also served as Executive Officer for three general officers, holds three master's degrees, and is a graduate of the Air Command and Staff College at Maxwell AFB, Alabama.

== Recent assignment ==
Lieutenant Colonel Brown is a former Commander, 320th Missile Squadron, 90th Missile Wing, Francis E. Warren Air Force Base, Wyoming. He was responsible for the safe, secure, and effective operation of 50 Minuteman III intercontinental ballistic missiles from 5 remote missile alert facilities dispersed over 2,000 square miles (5,200 km^{2}). In his previous assignment he served as the Director of Operations for the 319th Missile Squadron, Francis E. Warren Air Force Base, Wyoming.

== Past assignments ==
- 1992 - Student, Undergraduate Missile Training, 392d Training Squadron, Vandenberg AFB, California.
- 1992 - Crew Commander, TEF Instructor/Evaluator, 319th Missile Squadron, F.E. Warren AFB, Wyoming.
- 1995 - Chief, Simulator Courseware Division, 90th Operations Group, F.E. Warren AFB, Wyoming.
- 1996 - Academic & Operations Instructor, 392d Training Squadron, Vandenberg AFB, California.
- 1997 - Air Force Intern, HQ USAF, Pentagon, Washington DC.
- 1999 - Delta II Launch Crew Commander, 1st Space Launch Squadron, Cape Canaveral AFS, Florida.
- 2000 - Operations Flight Commander, 1st Space Launch Squadron, Cape Canaveral AFS, Florida.
- 2001 - Executive Officer, 45th Space Wing, Patrick AFB, Florida
- 2002 - Chief, Space Launch Concepts, Operations Directorate, Headquarters Air Force Space Command, Peterson AFB, Colorado.
- 2003 - Student, Air Command and Staff College, Maxwell AFB, Alabama.
- 2004 - Chief, Space Launch Vehicles Branch, HQ USAF, Pentagon, Washington DC.
- 2005 - Executive Officer, Directorate of Strategic Security, HQ USAF, Pentagon, Washington DC.
- 2006 - Political-Military Planner & Executive Assistant, Directorate of Global Security Affairs, Joint Staff, Pentagon, Washington DC.
- 2007 - Chief, Strategic Guidance Branch, Joint Staff, Pentagon, Washington DC.
- 2008 - Director of Operations, 319th Missile Squadron, F.E. Warren AFB, Wyoming.
- 2009 - Commander, 320th Missile Squadron, F.E. Warren AFB, Wyoming.
