= Eric Brown =

Eric Brown may refer to:

== Arts and entertainment ==
- Eric Brown (museum director) (1877–1939), director of the National Gallery of Canada
- Eric Brown (writer) (1960–2023), British science fiction author
- Eric Brown (actor) (born 1964), American film and TV actor
- Eric Brown (painter) (born 1967), American painter, art advisor, and editor
- Eric S. Brown (born 1975), American science fiction and horror novelist

== Sports ==
=== American football ===
- Eric Brown (wide receiver) (born 1964)
- Eric Brown (defensive back, born 1967)
- Eric Brown (safety) (born 1975)

=== Other sports ===
- Eric Brown (golfer) (1925–1986), Scottish golfer
- Eric Brown (rugby union) (born 1930), Irish rugby union player
- Eric Brown (weightlifter) (born 1969), weightlifter from American Samoa
- Eric Brown (footballer) (born 1990), Liberian footballer
- Eric Brown (baseball) (born 2000), American baseball player

== Others ==
- Eric Brown (judge) (born 1953), American jurist, Chief Justice of the Ohio Supreme Court
- Eric Brown (pilot) (1919–2016), British test pilot
- Eric Brown (politician) (born 1975), American politician in New York
- Eric D. Brown (fl. 1990s–2000s), United States Air Force officer
