= 321st Missile Squadron =

US Air Force unit

Coordinates: 41°07′59″N 104°52′01″W

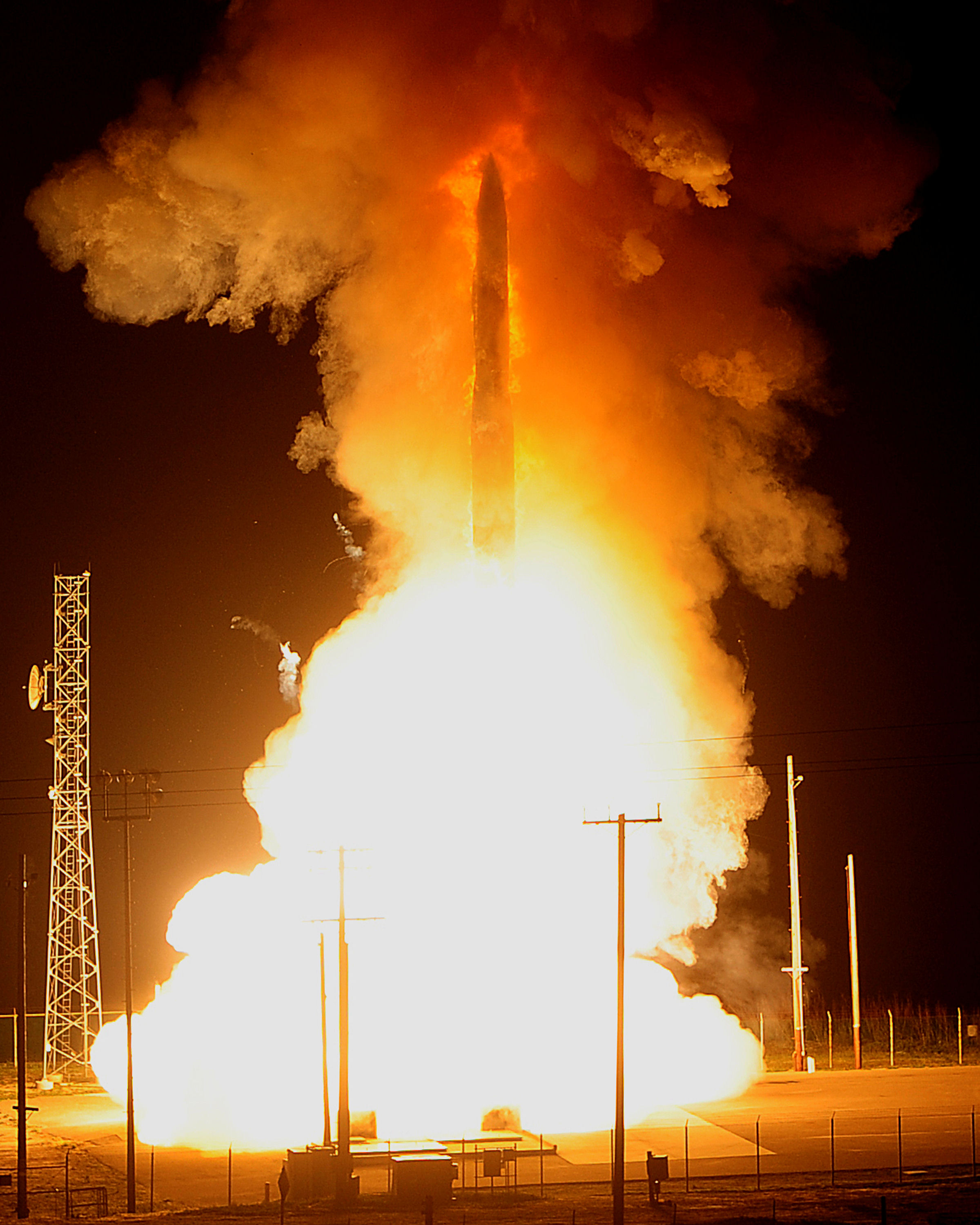
- LGM-30G Minuteman III test launch at Vandenberg AFB, California
- Active: 1942–1946; 1947–1948; 1951–1960; 1964–present
- Country: United States
- Branch: United States Air Force
- Type: Squadron
- Role: Intercontinental ballistic missile
- Part of: Air Force Global Strike Command
- Garrison/HQ: Francis E. Warren Air Force Base
- Nickname: Jolly Rogers
- Motto: 3-2-1...Bombs Away! (World War II)
- Engagements: Southwest Pacific Theater
- Decorations: Distinguished Unit Citation; Air Force Outstanding Unit Award; Philippine Presidential Unit Citation

Commanders
- Current commander: Lt. Col. David Bull

Insignia
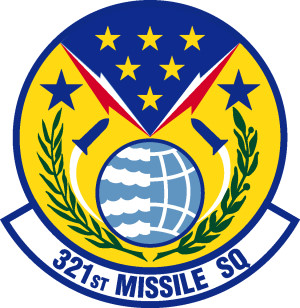
- 321st Missile Squadron emblem (Note: Approved 4 November 1965. Description: On a Blue Gold disc issuing from chief a Blue inverted chevron framed by two lightning bolts White and Red and bearing six Gold stars three-two-one, all flanked by two Blue stars. In base a Light Blue sphere parted per pale of four White bars wavy and White grid lines and rimmed Blue. Arched from base of sphere on each side a White vapor trail each terminating behind a Blue missile ascending within a palm branch arched in dexter and an olive branch arched in sinister, both Green.)

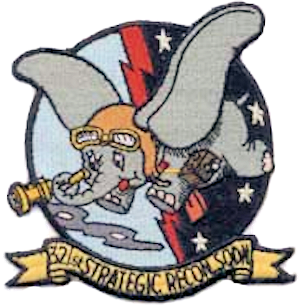
- Patch with unofficial 321st Strategic Reconnaissance Squadron emblem

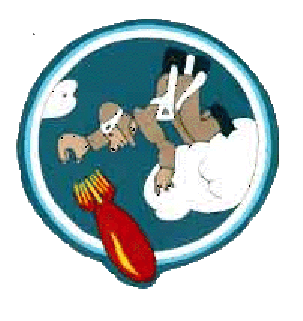
- 321st Bombardment Sq emblem (Note: approved 27 March 1943.)

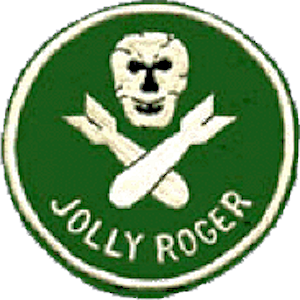
- 321st Bombardment Squadron "Jolly Rogers" patch (Note: The 90th Bombardment Group "Jolly Rogers" emblem was used as a squadron patch and as a tail marking on B-24s with each squadron having its own color in the background. Watkins, pp. 86–87.)

The 321st Missile Squadron is a United States Air Force unit. It is assigned to the 90th Operations Group, stationed at Francis E. Warren Air Force Base, Wyoming. The squadron is equipped with the LGM-30G Minuteman III Intercontinental ballistic missile (ICBM). Their mission is to operate safe and secure nuclear weapons, maintain mission ready facilities, and on order destroy OPLAN assigned targets.

== History ==
=== World War II ===
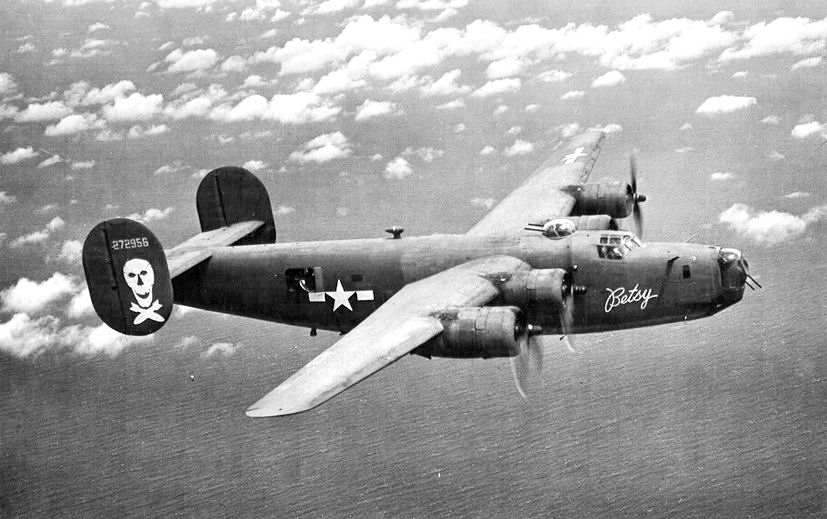
B-24D-170-CO Liberator 42-72956 on Mission to Wewak, New Guinea, 24 February 1944

The squadron was first organized as the 321st Bombardment Squadron at Key Field, Mississippi in April 1942 as a Consolidated B-24 Liberator unit and one of the original squadrons of the 90th Bombardment Group. The squadron trained with Liberators in the southeastern United States under III Bomber Command until August.

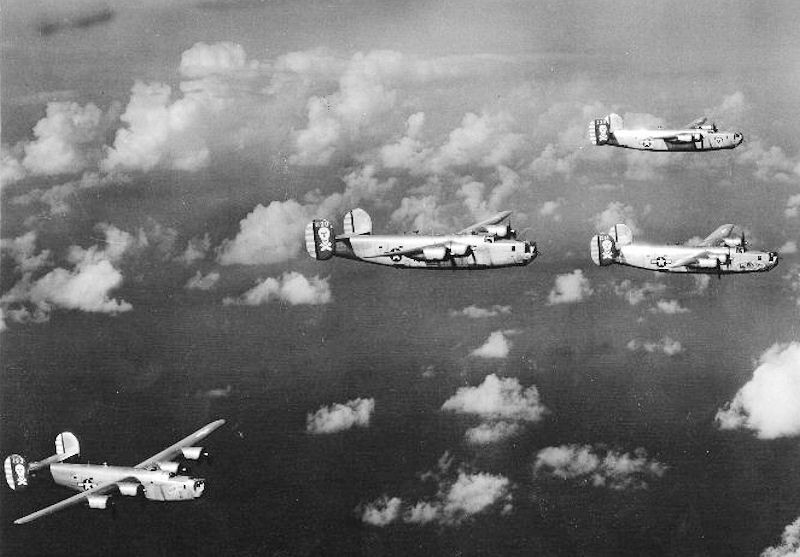
"Jolly Rogers" of the 90th Bombardment Group on a mission, 1943

The squadron moved to Willow Run Airport, Michigan for conversion training on newly manufactured Ford Liberators. Assigned to VII Bomber Command with B-24Ds, the unit moved to Hickam Field, Hawaii in September. The squadron arrived in northern Queensland, Australia in November 1942 and began bombardment missions under V Bomber Command almost immediately.

The squadron attacked enemy airfields, troop concentrations, ground installations and shipping in New Guinea, the Bismarck Archipelago, Palau and the southern Philippines. The 321st was awarded a Distinguished Unit Citation for its operations in Papua through January 1943. The unit participated in the Battle of Bismarck Sea in March 1943, and earned another citation for strikes on enemy airfields at Wewak, New Guinea in September 1943 despite heavy flak and fighter opposition.

During 1944, the 321st supported the New Guinea Campaign through the end of June, then made long-range raids on oil refineries at Balikpapan, Borneo, in September and October. In January 1945, the squadron moved to the Philippines and supported ground forces on Luzon, attacked industrial targets on Formosa, and bombed railways, airfields, and harbor facilities on the Asiatic mainland. Shortly before the end of the war in the Pacific, the 90th moved to Okinawa, from which it would be able to strike the Japanese home islands.

After VJ Day, the squadron flew reconnaissance missions over Japan and ferried Allied prisoners of war from Okinawa to Manila. It ceased operations by November 1945. The squadron was inactivated in the Philippines in early 1946.

=== Superfortress operations ===
The squadron was reactivated in July 1947 as a very heavy unit at Andrews Field, Maryland. It was a component of one of seven bombardment groups activated at Andrews by Strategic Air Command (SAC) that day. Most of these units, including the 321st, were inactivated by September 1948 and it does not appear they were manned during this period.

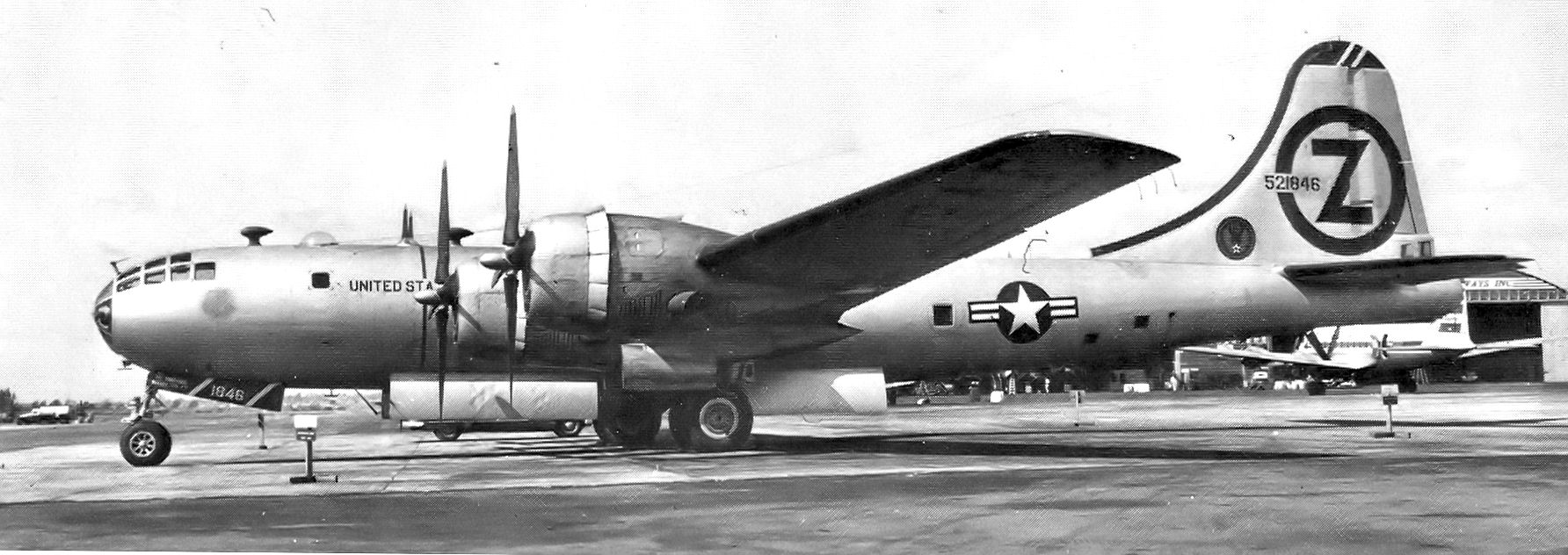
Wing Boeing B-29 (Note: Aircraft is Boeing B-29-100-BW Superfortress serial 45-21846.)

The squadron was again organized at Fairchild Air Force Base, Washington in January 1951 and equipped with the Boeing B-29 Superfortress. In February, as part of a reorganization of Strategic Air Command wings, the 90th Bombardment Group was reduced to paper status and the squadron was attached to the wing for operational control. In June 1952, this organization, which was designed to permit the wing commander to focus on the wing's combat units and the maintenance necessary to support combat aircraft, was formalized as the Dual Deputy Organization and the squadron was assigned to the wing.

In March 1951, the squadron moved to Forbes Air Force Base, where it served primarily as a training unit. In May, it began serving as an operational training unit for B-29 aircrews and mechanics of newly activating units. The squadron help organize and train the 376th, 308th, and 310th Bombardment Wings.

In June, the squadron added duty as a Replacement Training Unit, primarily providing individual training for aircrew being assigned to existing Far East Air Forces B-29 units during the Korean War. (Note: Replacement Training Units trained individuals to fill positions in existing units. See Goss, p. xxxvi.) In November 1952 it also began training replacement crews for the RB-29 reconnaissance model of the Superfortress and SHORAN personnel for Strategic Air Command (SAC). These training activities continued through November 1953.

=== Strategic reconnaissance ===
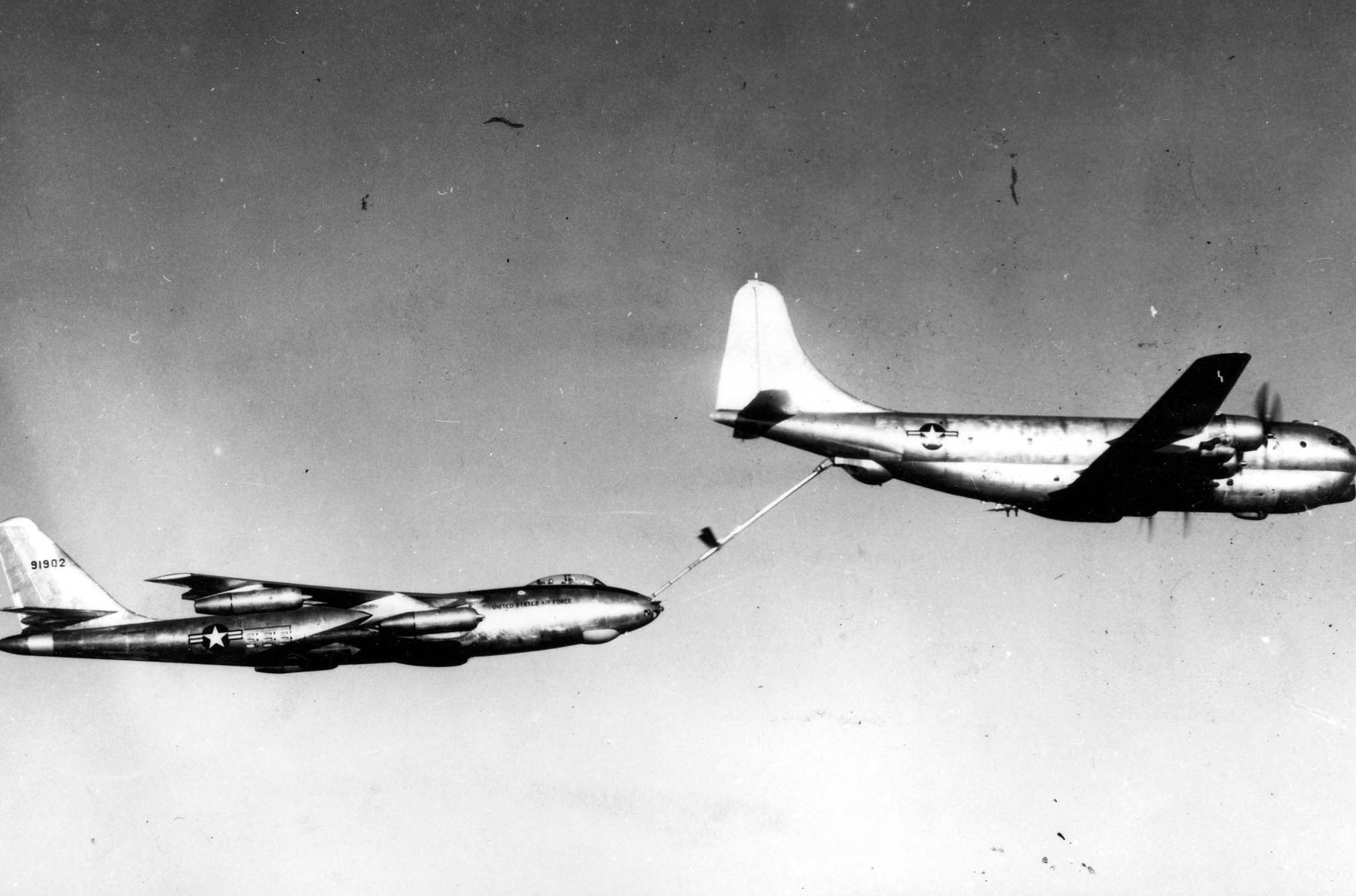
B-47 and KC-97 as flown by the wing

The squadron began to fly strategic reconnaissance missions in September 1953. The following year, it replaced its RB-29s with the jet Boeing RB-47 Stratojet, with the first B-47E arriving on 25 June, although crews had begun training in March. One year later, the squadron and the entire 90th Strategic Reconnaissance Wing deployed as a unit to Eielson Air Force Base, Alaska from 5 May until 31 August 1955, where the wing performed the final mapping of Alaska. In May 1958, the 90th Wing returned to the training mission serving as a combat crew training wing for RB-47 aircrews until it was inactivated on 20 June 1960. The squadron's personnel and equipment were transferred to the 45th Bombardment Squadron, which moved to Forbes on paper from Schilling Air Force Base, Kansas the same day.

=== Intercontinental ballistic missiles ===
The squadron was reactivated on 9 April 1964 as an intercontinental ballistic missile squadron assigned to the 90th Strategic Missile Wing at Francis E. Warren Air Force Base, Wyoming, and equipped with fifty LGM-30B Minuteman Is, armed with a single reentry vehicle. The squadron was the third of the 90th Wing's four Minuteman squadrons to activate, as construction on launch facilities continued until the middle of 1964. Beginning in June 1973, its Minuteman I missiles began to be replaced by LGM-30G Minuteman IIIs, which could carry up to three reentry vehicles. In 2001 in compliance with the Strategic Arms Reduction Treaty, these missiles were limited to a single reentry vehicle

The squadron won the Samuel C. Phillips Award as the best missile squadron in Air Force Space Command in 2005, 2010 and 2019.

== Lineage ==
- Constituted as the 321 Bombardment Squadron (Heavy) on 28 January 1942

Activated on 15 April 1942
Redesignated 321 Bombardment Squadron, Heavy on 6 March 1944
Inactivated on 27 January 1946
Redesignated 321 Bombardment Squadron, Very Heavy on 11 June 1947
Activated on 1 July 1947
Inactivated on 6 September 1948
Redesignated 321 Bombardment Squadron, Medium on 20 December 1950
Activated on 2 January 1951
Redesignated 321 Strategic Reconnaissance Squadron, Medium on 16 June 1952
Discontinued on 20 June 1960
Redesignated 321 Strategic Missile Squadron (ICBM-Minuteman) on 16 September 1963
Organized on 9 April 1964
Redesignated 321 Missile Squadron on 1 September 1991

=== Assignments ===
- 90th Bombardment Group, 15 April 1942 – 27 January 1946
- 90th Bombardment Group, 1 July 1947 – 6 September 1948
- 90th Bombardment Group, 2 January 1951 (attached to 90th Bombardment Wing after 16 February 1951)
- 90th Strategic Reconnaissance Wing, 16 June 1952 – 20 June 1960
- Strategic Air Command, 16 September 1963 (not organized)
- 90th Strategic Missile Wing, 9 April 1964
- 90th Operations Group, 1 September 1991 – present

=== Stations ===
- Key Field, Mississippi, 15 April 1942
- Barksdale Field, Louisiana, 17 May 1942
- Greenville Army Air Base, South Carolina, 21 June 1942
- Willow Run Airport, Michigan, 9–23 August 1942
- Wheeler Field, Hawaii, 12 September 1942
- Iron Range Airfield, Queensland, Australia, c. 4 November 1942
- Jackson Airfield (7 Mile Drome), Port Moresby, New Guinea, 10 February 1943
- Dobodura Airfield Complex, New Guinea, December 1943
- Nadzab Airfield Complex, New Guinea, c. 23 February 1944
- Mokmer Airfield, Biak Island, Netherlands East Indies, 12 August 1944
- McGuire Field, Mindoro, Philippines, 26 January 1945
- Ie Shima Airfield, Okinawa, 15 August 1945
- Fort William McKinley, Luzon, Philippines, 23 November 1945 – 27 January 1946
- Andrews Field (later Andrews Air Force Base), Maryland, 1 July 1947 – 6 September 1948
- Fairchild Air Force Base, Washington, 2 January 1951
- Forbes Air Force Base, Kansas, 14 March 1951 – 20 June 1960
- Francis E. Warren Air Force Base, Wyoming, 9 April 1964 – present

=== Aircraft and missiles ===
- Consolidated B-24 Liberator (1942–1945)
- Boeing RB-29 Superfortress (1951–1954)
- Boeing RB-47E Stratojet (1954–1960)
- LGM-30B Minuteman I (1964–1974)
- LGM-30G Minuteman III (1973 – Present)

=== Awards and campaigns ===
Award streamer	Award	Dates	Notes
	Distinguished Unit Citation	c. 4 November 1942 – 23 January 1943	Papua, 321st Bombardment Squadron
	Distinguished Unit Citation	13 and 15 September 1943	New Guinea, 321st Bombardment Squadron
	Air Force Outstanding Unit Award	1 July 1968 – 30 June 1969	321st Strategic Missile Squadron
	Air Force Outstanding Unit Award	1 July 1973 – 30 June 1975	321st Strategic Missile Squadron
	Air Force Outstanding Unit Award	1 July 1977 – 30 June 1979	321st Strategic Missile Squadron
	Air Force Outstanding Unit Award	1 July 1982 – 30 June 1984	321st Strategic Missile Squadron
	Air Force Outstanding Unit Award	1 July 1987 – 30 June 1989	321st Strategic Missile Squadron
	Air Force Outstanding Unit Award	1 August 1991 – 31 July 1993	321st Strategic Missile Squadron (later 321st Missile Squadron)
	Air Force Outstanding Unit Award	1 October 1994 – 30 September 1995	321st Missile Squadron
	Air Force Outstanding Unit Award	1 September 1996 – 31 August 1998	321st Missile Squadron
	Air Force Outstanding Unit Award	1 October 1999 – 30 September 2000	321st Missile Squadron
	Air Force Outstanding Unit Award	1 January 2001 – 31 December 2001	321st Missile Squadron
	Air Force Outstanding Unit Award	1 October 2003 – 30 September 2005	321st Missile Squadron
	Air Force Outstanding Unit Award	1 October 2005 – 30 September 2007	321st Missile Squadron
	Air Force Outstanding Unit Award	1 October 2007 – 30 September 2008	321st Missile Squadron
	Air Force Outstanding Unit Award	1 October 2008 – 31 May 2010	321st Missile Squadron
	Air Force Outstanding Unit Award	1 January 2011 – 31 December 2012	321st Missile Squadron
	Philippine Republic Presidential Unit Citation	17 October 1944 – 4 July 1945	321st Bombardment Squadron

Campaign Streamer	Campaign	Dates	Notes
	Guadalcanal	c. 4 November 1942 – 21 February 1943	321st Bombardment Squadron
	Papua	c. 4 November – 23 January 1943	321st Bombardment Squadron
	Northern Solomons	23 February 1943 – 21 November 1944	321st Bombardment Squadron
	Bismarck Archipelago	15 December 1943 – 27 November 1944	321st Bombardment Squadron
	New Guinea	24 January 1943 – 31 December 1944	321st Bombardment Squadron
	Leyte	17 October 1944 – 1 July 1945	321st Bombardment Squadron
	Luzon	15 December 1944 – 4 July 1945	321st Bombardment Squadron
	Southern Philippines	27 February 1945 – 4 July 1945	321st Bombardment Squadron
	China Defensive	November 1942 – 4 May 1945	321st Bombardment Squadron
	China Offensive	5 May 1945 – 2 September 1945	321st Bombardment Squadron
	Air Offensive, Japan	November 1942 – 2 September 1945	321st Bombardment Squadron
	Western Pacific	17 April 1944 – 2 September 1945	321st Bombardment Squadron

== See also ==
- 321st Missile Squadron Launch Facilities
- B-24 Liberator units of the United States Army Air Forces
- List of United States Air Force missile squadrons
