= 319th Missile Squadron =

US Air Force unit

Coordinates: 41°07′59″N 104°52′01″W

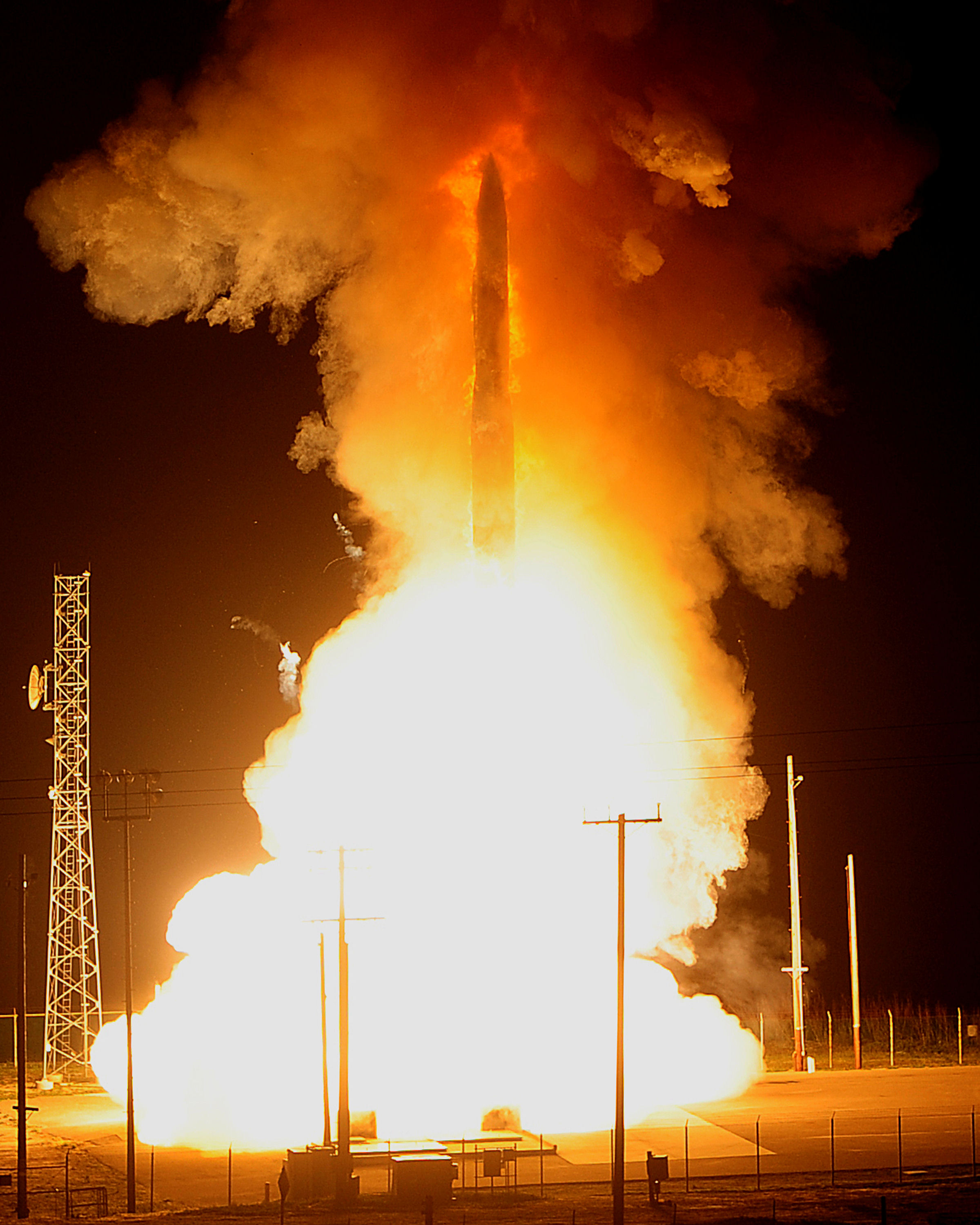
- LGM-30G Minuteman III test launch at Vandenberg AFB, California
- Active: 1942–1946; 1947–1948; 1951–1960; 1963–present
- Country: United States
- Branch: United States Air Force
- Type: Squadron
- Role: Intercontinental ballistic missile
- Part of: Air Force Global Strike Command
- Garrison/HQ: Francis E. Warren Air Force Base
- Nickname: Asterperious (World War II)
- Engagements: Southwest Pacific Theater
- Decorations: Distinguished Unit Citation; Air Force Outstanding Unit Award; Philippine Presidential Unit Citation

Insignia
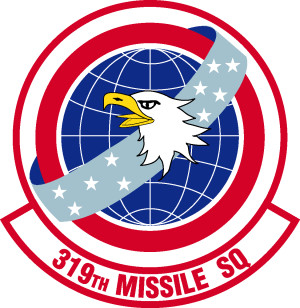
- 319th Missile Squadron emblem (Note: Approved 2 September 1955. Description: An Air Force blue sphere encircled with a white edge and a red border, a wide sky blue ribbon, spattered with white stars, encircling the upper left to the lower right of the disc; overall in center the head of an American Eagle proper.)

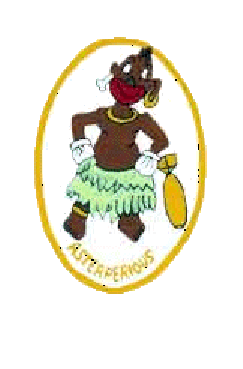
- 319th Bombardment Squadron emblem (Note: Approved 11 June 1943.)

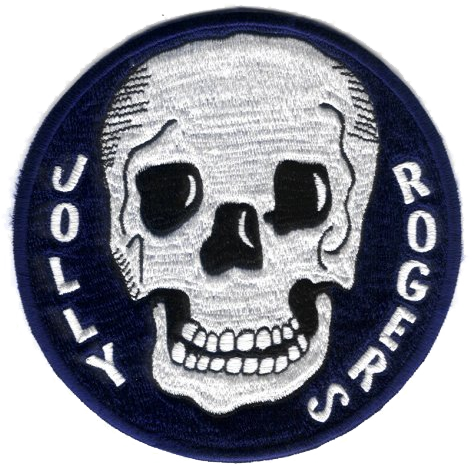
- 319th Bombardment Squadron "Jolly Rogers" patch (Note: The 90th Bombardment Group "Jolly Rogers" emblem was used as a squadron patch and as a tail marking on B-24s with each squadron having its own color in the background. Watkins, pp. 86–87.)

The 319th Missile Squadron is a United States Air Force unit assigned to the 90th Operations Group at Francis E. Warren Air Force Base, Wyoming. The squadron is equipped with the LGM-30G Minuteman III intercontinental ballistic missile, with a mission of nuclear deterrence. It is the flagship squadron of the 90th Missile Wing.

The squadron was first activated as the 319th Bombardment Squadron in 1942. It flew Consolidated B-24 Liberators in the Pacific during World War II, where it earned two Distinguished Unit Citations and a Philippine Republic Presidential Unit Citation for its actions in combat. After VJ Day, the squadron remained in the Philippines until January 1946, when it was inactivated.

The squadron was again activated in 1951 at Fairchild Air Force Base, Washington, a Boeing B-29 Superfortress unit. After moving to Forbes Air Force Base, Kansas, it served as a training unit for Strategic Air Command units and aircrews in the B-29. In 1953 it converted to the strategic reconnaissance mission, upgrading to the Boeing RB-47 Stratojet in 1954. After 1958 it trained reconnaissance crews with the B-47 and continued that mission until it was inactivated in 1960.

The squadron was activated again in 1963 as the 319th Strategic Missile Squadron, an LGM-30B Minuteman I squadron. In 1974 it modernized its missiles to the multi-warhead Minuteman III. Following the implementation of the Strategic Arms Reduction Treaty, its missiles were limited to a single warhead.

== Mission ==
The squadron operates 50 LGM-30G Minuteman III intercontinental ballistic missiles on full alert 24 hours a day, 365 days a year. It missiles are dispersed in hardened silos to protect against attack and connected to underground missile alert facilities through a system of hardened cables.

== History ==
=== World War II ===
The squadron was first organized as the 319th Bombardment Squadron at Key Field, Mississippi in April 1942 as a Consolidated B-24 Liberator unit and one of the original squadrons of the 90th Bombardment Group. The squadron trained with Liberators in the southeastern United States under III Bomber Command until August.

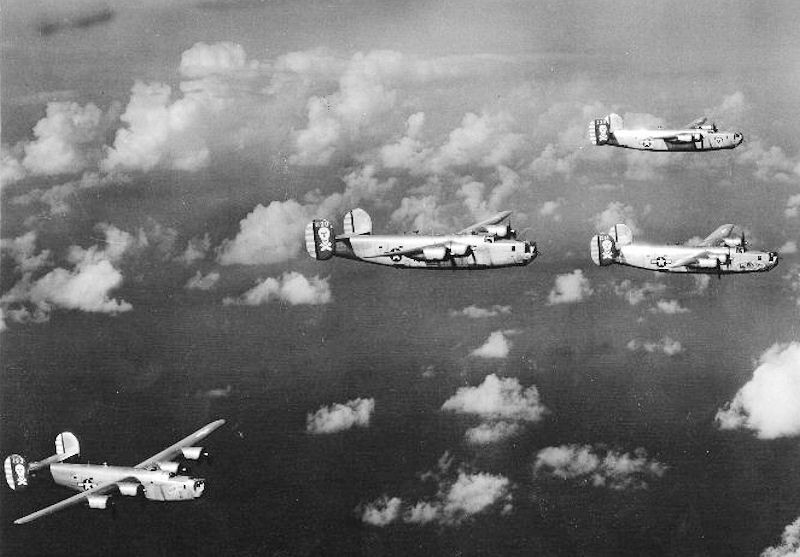
"Jolly Rogers" of the 90th Bombardment Group on a mission, 1943

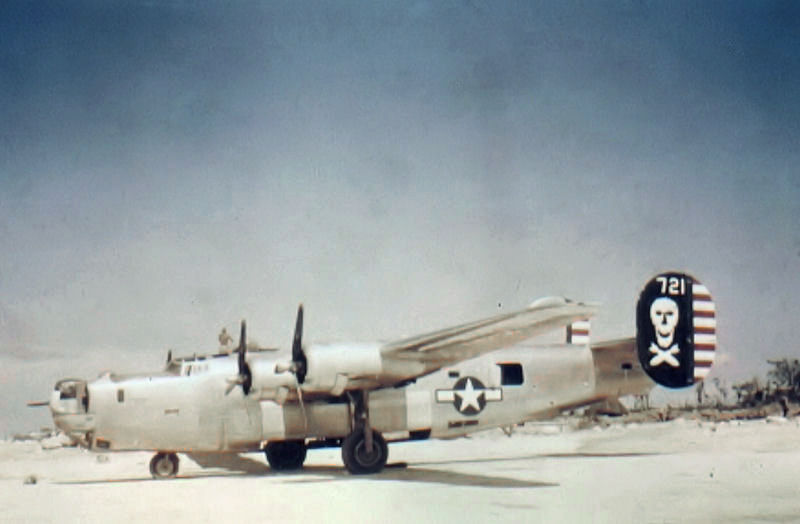
B-24J with the distinct nose turret, probably in 1944.

The squadron moved to Willow Run Airport, Michigan for conversion training on newly manufactured Ford Liberators. Assigned to VII Bomber Command with B-24Ds, the unit moved to Hickam Field, Hawaii in September. The squadron arrived in northern Queensland, Australia in November 1942 and began bombardment missions under V Bomber Command almost immediately.

The squadron attacked enemy airfields, troop concentrations, ground installations and shipping in New Guinea, the Bismarck Archipelago, Palau and the southern Philippines. The 319th was awarded a Distinguished Unit Citation for its operations in Papua through January 1943. The unit participated in the Battle of Bismarck Sea in March 1943, and earned another citation for strikes on enemy airfields at Wewak, New Guinea in September 1943 despite heavy flak and fighter opposition.

During 1944, the 319th supported the New Guinea Campaign through the end of June, then made long-range raids on oil refineries at Balikpapan, Borneo, in September and October. In January 1945, the squadron moved to the Philippines and supported ground forces on Luzon, attacked industrial targets on Formosa, and bombed railways, airfields, and harbor facilities on the Asiatic mainland. Shortly before the end of the war in the Pacific, the 90th moved to Okinawa, from which it would be able to strike the Japanese home islands.

After VJ Day, the squadron flew reconnaissance missions over Japan and ferried Allied prisoners of war from Okinawa to Manila. It ceased operations by November 1945. The squadron was inactivated in the Philippines in early 1946.

=== Superfortress operations ===
The squadron was reactivated in July 1947 as a very heavy unit at Andrews Field, Maryland. It was a component of one of seven bombardment groups activated at Andrews by Strategic Air Command (SAC) that day. Most of these units, including the 319th, were inactivated by September 1948 and it does not appear they were manned during this period.

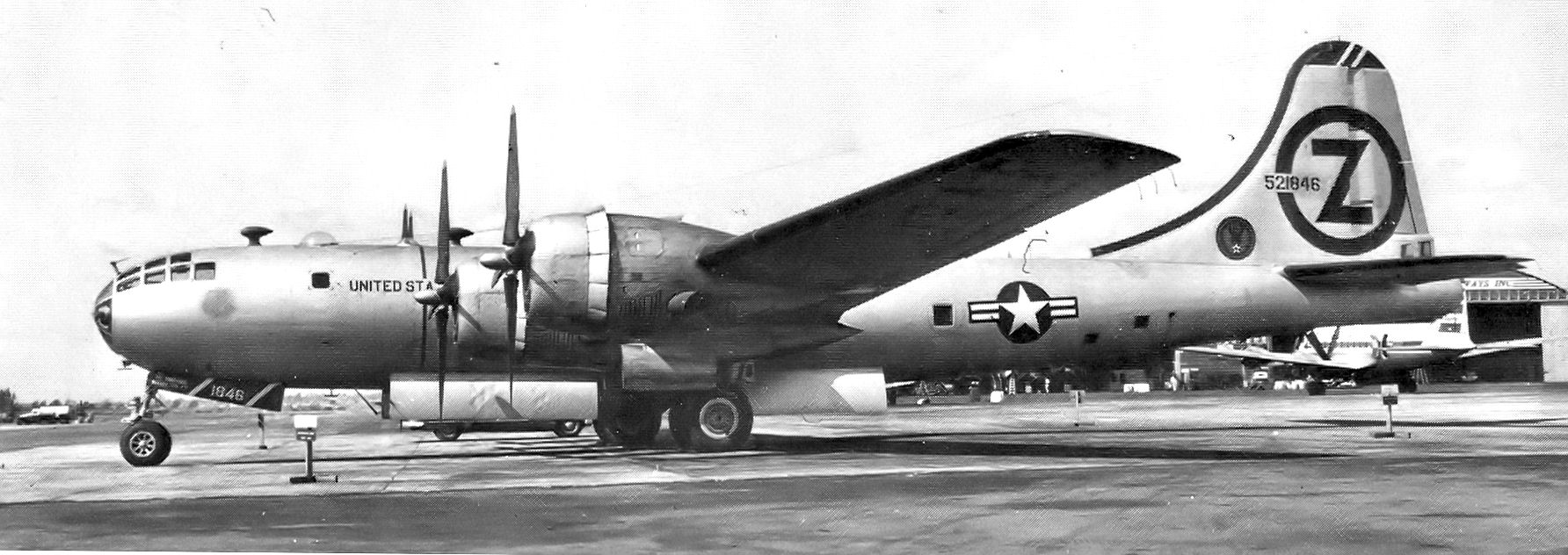
Wing Boeing B-29 (Note: Aircraft is Boeing B-29-100-BW Superfortress serial 45-21846.)

The squadron was again organized at Fairchild Air Force Base, Washington in January 1951 and equipped with the Boeing B-29 Superfortress. In February, as part of a reorganization of Strategic Air Command wings, the 90th Bombardment Group was reduced to paper status and the squadron was attached to the wing for operational control. In June 1952, this organization, which was designed to permit the wing commander to focus on the wing's combat units and the maintenance necessary to support combat aircraft, was formalized as the Dual Deputy Organization and the squadron was assigned to the wing.

In March 1951, the squadron moved to Forbes Air Force Base, where it served primarily as a training unit. In May, it began serving as an Operational Training Unit for B-29 aircrews and mechanics of newly-activating units. The squadron help organize and train the 376th, 308th, and 310th Bombardment Wings.

In June, the squadron added duty as a Replacement Training Unit, primarily providing individual training for aircrew being assigned to existing Far East Air Forces B-29 units during the Korean War. (Note: Replacement Training Units trained individuals to fill positions in existing units. See Goss, p. xxxvi.) In November 1952 it also began training replacement crews for the RB-29 reconnaissance model of the Superfortress and SHORAN personnel for Strategic Air Command (SAC). These training activities continued through November 1953.

=== Strategic reconnaissance ===
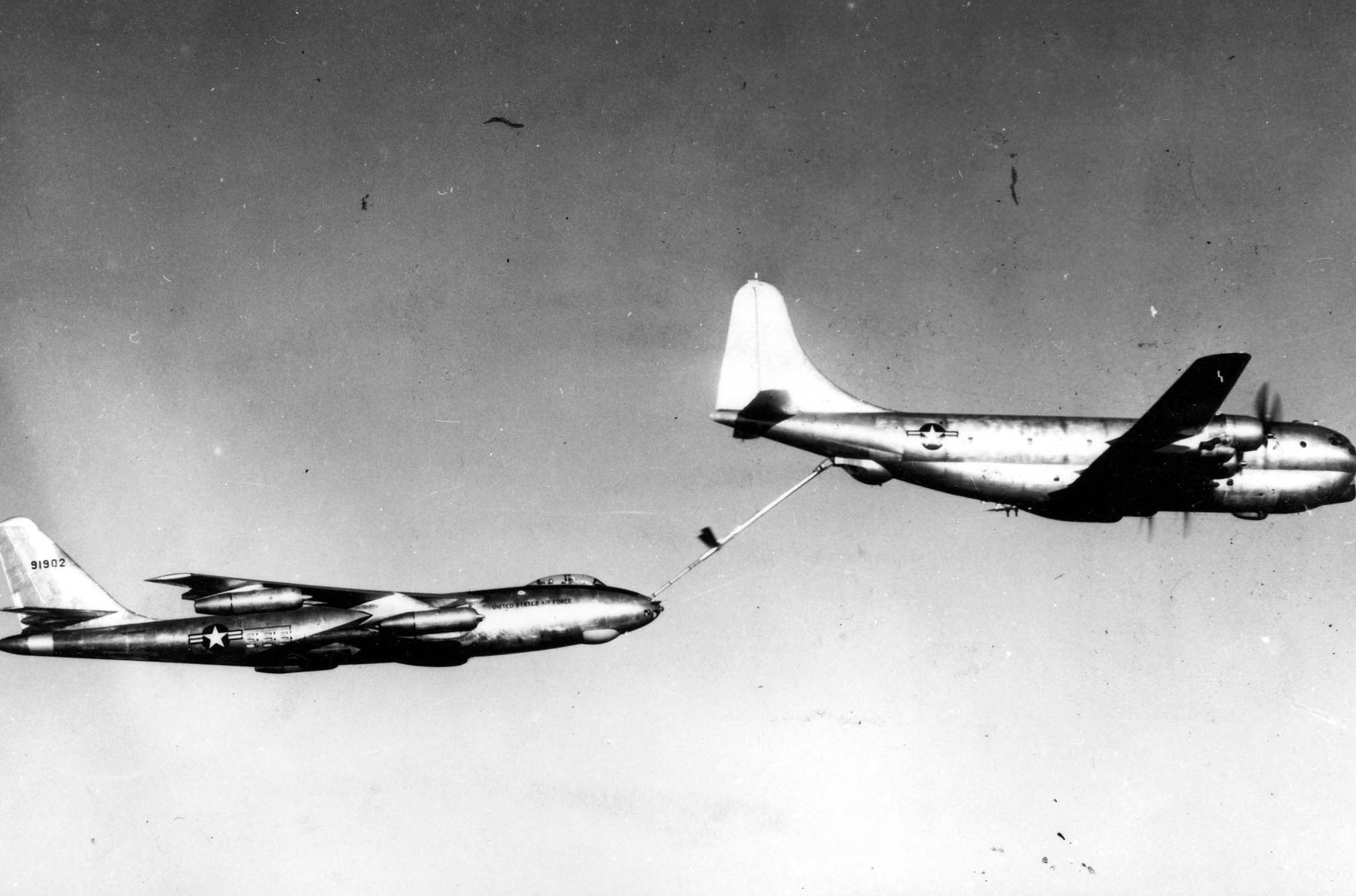
B-47 and KC-97 as flown by the wing

The squadron began to fly strategic reconnaissance missions in September 1953. The following year, it replaced its RB-29s with the jet Boeing RB-47 Stratojet, with the first B-47E arriving on 25 June, although crews had begun training in March. One year later, the squadron and the entire 90th Strategic Reconnaissance Wing deployed as a unit to Eielson Air Force Base, Alaska from 5 May until 31 August 1955, where the wing performed the final mapping of Alaska. In May 1958, the 90th Wing returned to the training mission serving as a combat crew training wing for RB-47 aircrews until it was inactivated on 20 June 1960. The squadron's personnel and equipment were transferred to the 25th Bombardment Squadron, which moved to Forbes on paper from Schilling Air Force Base, Kansas the same day.

=== Intercontinental ballistic missiles ===
The squadron was reactivated on 1 October 1963 as an intercontinental ballistic missile squadron assigned to the 90th Strategic Missile Wing at Francis E. Warren Air Force Base, Wyoming, and equipped with fifty LGM-30B Minuteman Is, armed with a single reentry vehicle. The squadron was the first of the 90th Wing's four Minuteman squadrons to activate, as construction on launch facilities continued until the middle of 1964. Beginning in June 1973, its Minuteman I missiles began to be replaced by LGM-30G Minuteman IIIs, which could carry up to three reentry vehicles. In 2001 in compliance with the Strategic Arms Reduction Treaty, these missiles were limited to a single reentry vehicle

In 1996 the squadron won the Blanchard Trophy as the best missile operations squadron at the Guardian Challenge missile competition and the Samuel C. Phillips Award as the best missile squadron in the command. (Note: The Blanchard Trophy was awarded at the squadron level for only a few years. For most of its existence it was awarded at the wing level. The 90th Wing has also won this award. 90th Missile Wing Heritage Pamphlet, p. 26.) In more recent competitions, the squadron won the Neary Trophy and the Linhard Trophy for best USAF missile crew in 2011.

== Lineage ==
- Constituted as the 319 Bombardment Squadron (Heavy) on 28 January 1942

Activated on 15 April 1942
Redesignated 319 Bombardment Squadron, Heavy on 6 March 1944
Inactivated on 27 January 1946
Redesignated 319 Bombardment Squadron, Very Heavy on 11 June 1947
Activated on 1 July 1947
Inactivated on 6 September 1948
Redesignated 319 Bombardment Squadron, Medium on 20 December 1950
Activated on 2 January 1951
Redesignated 319 Strategic Reconnaissance Squadron, Medium on 16 June 1952
Discontinued on 20 June 1960
Redesignated 319 Strategic Missile Squadron (ICBM-Minuteman) on 24 May 1963
Organized on 1 October 1963
Redesignated 319 Missile Squadron on 1 September 1991.

=== Assignments ===
- 90th Bombardment Group, 15 April 1942 – 27 January 1946
- 90th Bombardment Group, 1 July 1947 – 6 September 1948
- 90th Bombardment Group, 2 January 1951 (attached to 90th Bombardment Wing after 16 February 1951)
- 90th Strategic Reconnaissance Wing, 16 June 1952 – 20 June 1960
- Strategic Air Command, 24 May 1963 (not organized)
- 90th Strategic Missile Wing, 1 October 1963
- 90th Operations Group, 1 September 1991 – present

=== Stations ===
- Key Field, Mississippi, 15 April 1942
- Barksdale Field, Louisiana, 17 May 1942
- Greenville Army Air Base, South Carolina, 21 June 1942
- Willow Run Airport, Michigan, 9 – 23 August 1942
- Kahuku Field, Hawaii, 12 September 1942
- Iron Range Airfield, Queensland, Australia, c. 4 November 1942
- RAAF Base Darwin, Northern Territory, Australia, 2 February 1943
- Jackson Airfield (7 Mile Drome), Port Moresby, New Guinea, 8 July 1943
- Dobodura Airfield Complex, New Guinea, December 1943
- Nadzab Airfield Complex, New Guinea, c. 22 February 1944
- Mokmer Airfield, Biak Island, Netherlands East Indies, c. 10 August 1944
- McGuire Field, Mindoro, Philippines, 29 January 1945
- Ie Shima Airfield, Okinawa, 12 August 1945
- Fort William McKinley, Luzon, Philippines, 23 November 1945 – 27 January 1946
- Andrews Field (later Andrews Air Force Base, Maryland, 1 July 1947 – 6 September 1948
- Fairchild Air Force Base, Washington, 2 January 1951
- Forbes Air Force Base, Kansas, 14 March 1951 – 20 June 1960
- Francis E. Warren Air Force Base, Wyoming, 1 Oct 1963–present

=== Aircraft and missiles ===
- Consolidated B-24 Liberator (1942–1945)
- Boeing RB-29 Superfortress (1951–1954)
- Boeing RB-47E Stratojet (1954–1960)
- LGM-30B Minuteman I (1964–1974)
- LGM-30G Minuteman III (1973 – present)

=== Awards and campaigns ===
Award streamer	Award	Dates	Notes
	Distinguished Unit Citation	c. 4 November 1942 – 23 January 1943	Papua, 319th Bombardment Squadron
	Distinguished Unit Citation	13 and 15 September 1943	New Guinea, 319th Bombardment Squadron
	Air Force Outstanding Unit Award	1 July 1968–30 June 1969	319th Strategic Missile Squadron
	Air Force Outstanding Unit Award	1 July 1973–30 June 1975	319th Strategic Missile Squadron
	Air Force Outstanding Unit Award	1 July 1982–30 June 1984	319th Strategic Missile Squadron
	Air Force Outstanding Unit Award	1 July 1986–30 June 1988	319th Strategic Missile Squadron
	Air Force Outstanding Unit Award	1 July 1987–30 June 1989	319th Strategic Missile Squadron
	Air Force Outstanding Unit Award	1 August 1991–31 July 1993	319th Strategic Missile Squadron (later 319th Missile Squadron)
	Air Force Outstanding Unit Award	1 October 1994–30 September 1995	319th Missile Squadron
	Air Force Outstanding Unit Award	1 September 1996–31 August 1998	319th Missile Squadron
	Air Force Outstanding Unit Award	1 October 1999–30 September 2000	319th Missile Squadron
	Air Force Outstanding Unit Award	1 January 2001–31 December 2001	319th Missile Squadron
	Air Force Outstanding Unit Award	1 October 2003–30 September 2005	319th Missile Squadron
	Air Force Outstanding Unit Award	1 October 2005–30 September 2007	319th Missile Squadron
	Air Force Outstanding Unit Award	1 October 2007–30 September 2008	319th Missile Squadron
	Philippine Republic Presidential Unit Citation	17 October 1944–4 July 1945	319th Bombardment Squadron

Campaign Streamer	Campaign	Dates	Notes
	Guadalcanal	c. 4 November 1942 – 21 February 1943	319th Bombardment Squadron
	Papua	c. 4 November–23 January 1943	319th Bombardment Squadron
	Northern Solomons	23 February 1943 – 21 November 1944	319th Bombardment Squadron
	Bismarck Archipelago	15 December 1943 – 27 November 1944	319th Bombardment Squadron
	New Guinea	24 January 1943 – 31 December 1944	319th Bombardment Squadron
	Leyte	17 October 1944 – 1 July 1945	319th Bombardment Squadron
	Luzon	15 December 1944 – 4 July 1945	319th Bombardment Squadron
	Southern Philippines	27 February 1945 – 4 July 1945	319th Bombardment Squadron
	China Defensive	November 1942–4 May 1945	319th Bombardment Squadron
	China Offensive	5 May 1945 – 2 September 1945	319th Bombardment Squadron
	Air Offensive, Japan	November 1942–2 September 1945	319th Bombardment Squadron
	Western Pacific	17 April 1944 – 2 September 1945	319th Bombardment Squadron

== See also ==
- List of United States Air Force missile squadrons
- 319th Missile Squadron Launch Facilities
- B-24 Liberator units of the United States Army Air Forces
