= Francis E. Warren Air Force Base =

US Air Force base near Cheyenne, Wyoming, United States

- Cheyenne, Wyoming in United States of America
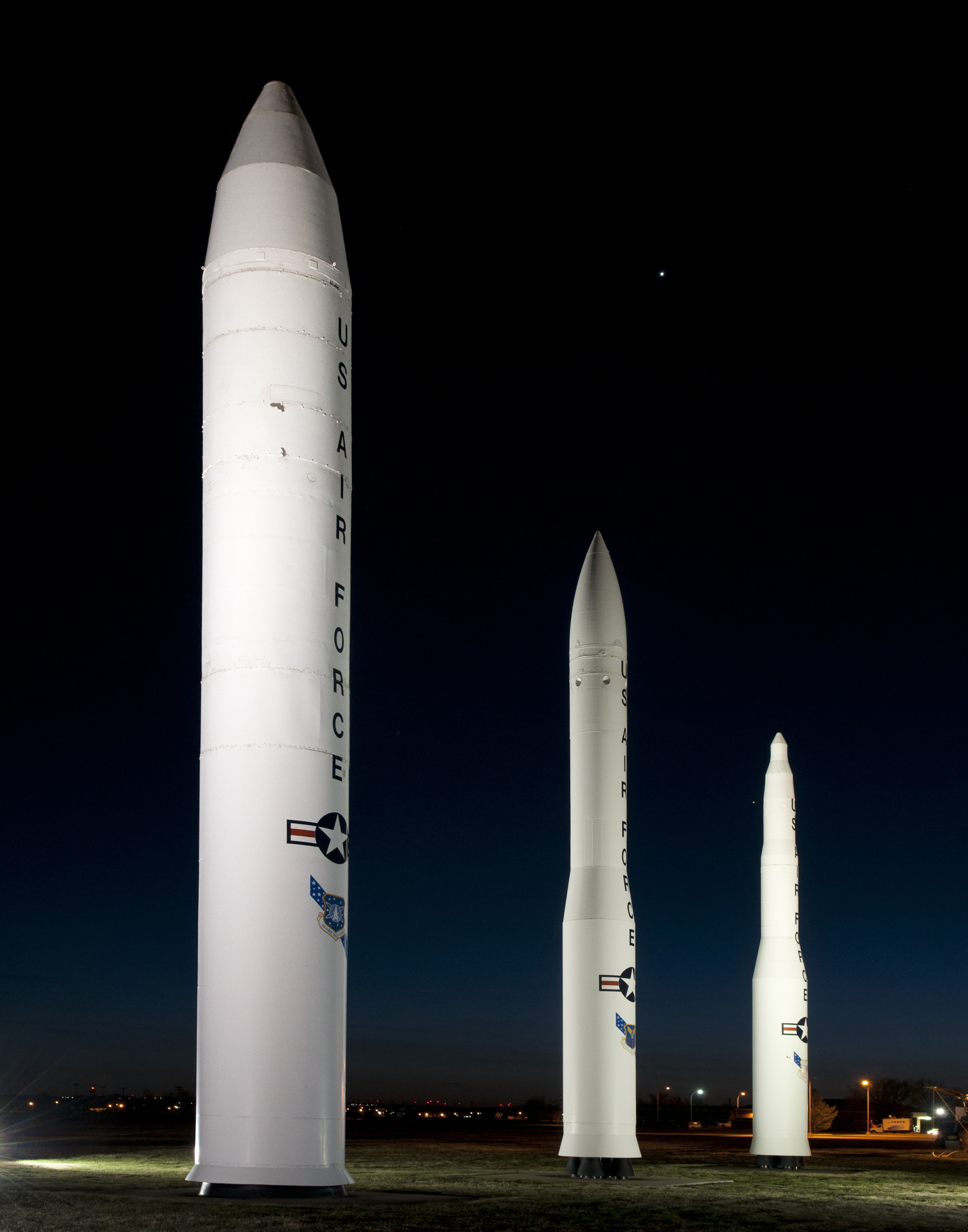
- A static display of intercontinental ballistic missiles at F.E. Warren AFB during 2012. From left are the Peacekeeper, the Minuteman III and the Minuteman I.

Site information
- Type: US Air Force base
- Owner: Department of Defense
- Operator: United States Air Force
- Controlled by: Air Force Global Strike Command
- Condition: Operational
- Website: www.warren.af.mil

Location
- Location within Wyoming Location within the United States Location within North America
- Coordinates: 41°07′59″N 104°52′01″W

Site history
- Built: 1867 (as Fort Russell)
- In use: 1867–1947 (US Army); 1947–present (USAF)

Garrison information
- Current commander: Colonel Terrance Holmes
- Garrison: 90th Missile Wing

Airfield information
- Identifiers: IATA: FEW, ICAO: KFEW, FAA LID: FEW, WMO: 725640
- Elevation: 1,878 metres (6,161 ft) AMSL
Runways
Direction	Length and surface
14S/32S	320 metres (1,050 ft) turf
6S/24S	320 metres (1,050 ft) turf
Helipads
Number	Length and surface
H1	20 metres (66 ft) concrete
H2	15 metres (49 ft) concrete
- Source: AirNav.com

Francis E. Warren Air Force Base (ICAO: KFEW, FAA LID: FEW), shortened as F.E. Warren AFB, is a United States Air Force base (AFB) located about 3 miles (4.8 km) west of Cheyenne, Wyoming. It is one of three strategic-missile bases in the U.S. It was named in honor of Medal of Honor recipient Francis E. Warren in 1930. Warren AFB is home of the 90th Missile Wing (90 MW), assigned to the Twentieth Air Force, Air Force Global Strike Command. The 90 MW operates the LGM-30G Minuteman III ICBM. It is also the home of Twentieth Air Force, which commands all U.S. Air Force ICBMs.

Warren AFB is the oldest continuously active military installation within the Air Force, established in 1867 (159 years ago) by the United States Army as Fort David Allen Russell. The facility came under the control of the United States Army Air Forces on 1 June 1947, and then of the United States Air Force (USAF) on 18 September 1947.

The 90th Missile Wing is commanded by Colonel Johnny L. Galbert. Twentieth Air Force, co-located at Warren AFB, is under the command of Major General Michael Lutton. Warren AFB is a census-designated place and had a resident population of 2,863 at the 2010 census.

== History ==
The history of the base dates back to the Railroad Act of 1862, when President Abraham Lincoln and Congress set plans for the transcontinental railroad. The plans included a military installation on the eastern slope of the Rocky Mountains in the Wyoming Territory, to protect Union Pacific Railroad workers from hostile Indians. From these pioneer origins, the base evolved from a frontier infantry and cavalry post into the largest, most modern strategic missile facility in the U.S. Air Force. F.E. Warren AFB is named in honor of Wyoming's first United States Senator, Francis Emroy Warren (1844–1929), who was awarded the Medal of Honor at age 19 during the American Civil War.

=== United States Army ===
==== Fort Russell 1867–1927 ====
On 4 July 1867, the Union Pacific Railroad established its mountain region headquarters at Crow Creek Crossing, later known as Cheyenne. A few weeks later, the U.S. Cavalry moved from temporary headquarters in Cheyenne to a point 3 miles (5 km) west and established Fort D. A. Russell. Thus, 1867 was the beginning of a city and a fort, and both have grown together over the years.

Detachments of the 30th Infantry formed the first garrison, under the command of Colonel John D. Stevenson. For a brief time the troops lived in tents, but during the winter of 1867–68 they moved into wood-frame quarters. The dwellings were set in the shape of a diamond, instead of a rectangle, to protect against harsh winter winds that howled across the then treeless high plains. The diamond opened to the east and measured 800 by 1,040 feet (320 m). The entrance to the original fort was at a point next to the present day Chapel 1. The first troops stationed here lived the rough frontier life, which meant coping with the rigors of the weather in winter and coping with Indians in spring and summer.

In 1876, troops from Fort Russell participated in the Great Sioux Indian Wars, the same in which Lieutenant Colonel George Armstrong Custer's forces were defeated.

In 1884, Fort Russell was made a permanent post, because of its strategic location. In 1885, the War Department ordered the post be rebuilt to serve eight infantry companies. The Army built 27 red brick buildings for $100,000 to replace the older wood-frame structures, and planted thousands of trees. Many of the early brick buildings were stables that housed nearly 20,000 horses and mules. From 1885 to 1930, more than 220 brick buildings were erected; most of them remain in use today. The last expansion of the base took place in the early 20th century when large barracks along Randall Avenue were constructed. The base maintains the historic exterior of each building with interior modifications for today's living and working environment.

In 1866, Congress formed four black regiments: the 9th and 10th Cavalry and 24th and 25th Infantry. The 25th Infantry was the only unit that didn't serve at Fort D. A. Russell. Black soldiers were called "Buffalo Soldiers," a title originating from Native Americans who likened the soldiers to the spiritual buffalo.

In 1898, the Spanish–American War renewed importance to the post. Soon after President McKinley sent a message to Congress, the 8th Infantry left Fort D. A. Russell for Cuba. Later that year, the Wyoming National Guard mustered into service at the post and departed for duty in the Philippines. In the Battle of Manila (1898), the Guard was the first battalion to reach the walls of the city and to raise the flag. In 1901, troops from Fort Russell returned to the Philippines to put down an insurrection for independence during the Philippine–American War laying ground for the occupation. They returned with a Queen Mary Tudor cannon forged in 1557 and two of the three Balangiga bells, which had been used by insurrectionists as a signal to launch an ambush on American troops. The bells were returned to the Philippines in 2018. The seven-foot cannon, the only one of its kind in America is on display near the base flagpole.

In 1906, Secretary of War William Howard Taft recommended Fort Russell expand to a brigade-size post. By 1910, the construction of red brick quarters, two-story barracks, offices and stables had tripled the area of the post. During this era, artillery units were assigned there, and the facility increased in size to accommodate troop training with the latest 20th century weapons.

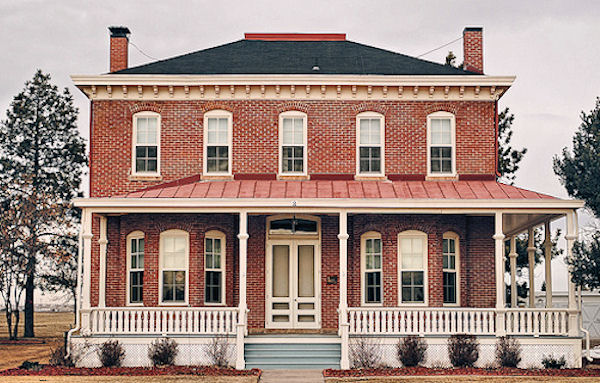
Former U.S. Army residence of General John J. Pershing at Warren AFB

From 1913 to 1916, during the Mexican Revolution, post artillery units were stationed along the border to prevent the struggle from coming onto American soil. During World War I, the post served as a mobilization point and training facility for field artillery and cavalry groups. As World War I began, Fort Russell had become one of the largest military posts in the United States.

What stands as quarters No. 2 today was, in 1885, the post commander's home. By tradition, the post commander always occupied the largest house on post. Hence, the commander moved into quarters No. 8 when it was built in 1903. Quarters No. 2 was then assigned to the family of Captain John "Black Jack" Pershing, who later led American forces in Europe during World War I. Pershing married U.S. Senator Francis E. Warren's daughter, but she preferred staying with her father when her husband was on campaign. Pershing would be promoted four ranks from his permanent rank of captain to brigadier general within two years of his marriage, the Senate's approval of his nomination by President Theodore Roosevelt aided by his father-in-law's influence.

==== Fort Warren, 1930–1945 ====
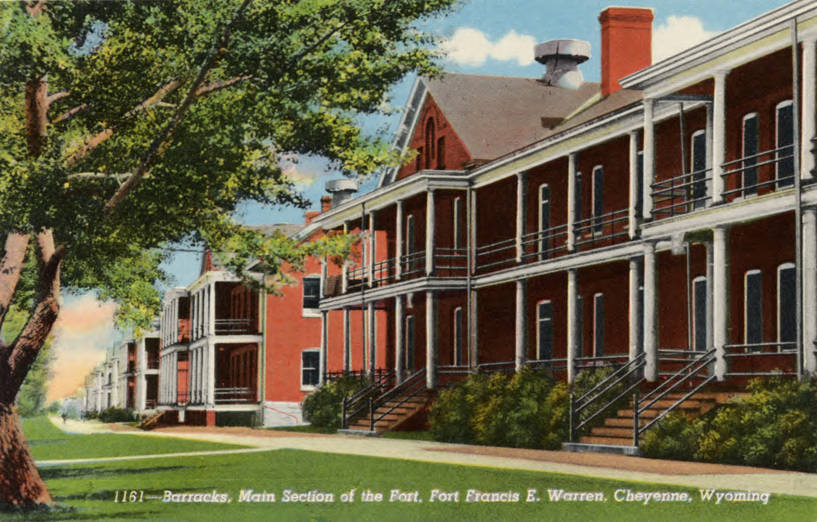
A postcard showing the exterior barracks, circa 1941

In 1927, the last cavalry units left the installation, ending 60 years of cavalry history at Fort Russell. President Hoover issued a proclamation in 1930 which renamed the post "Fort Francis E. Warren," to honor Wyoming's territorial and first state governor. Warren, who received the Medal of Honor for heroism during the Civil War at the age of 19, was a U.S. Senator for 37 years, dying in office in November 1929 at the age of 85. Other well-known figures stationed here include General Billy Mitchell (the "Father of the Air Force"), General Mark Clark (World War II General in Europe), Brigadier General Benjamin O. Davis Sr. (first black general), Dr. Walter Reed and singer Sammy Davis, Jr. Entertainer Chris LeDoux grew up at Warren AFB.

During World War II, Fort Warren was the training center for up to 20,000 of the Quartermaster Corps. More than 280 wooden buildings were constructed without insulation and interior walls to temporarily house the increased number of troops. In the harsh Wyoming winter, waking up in these barracks often meant shaking snow from one's blanket before heading for the just-as-cold communal showers. A prisoner of war camp was also constructed at that time.

=== United States Air Force ===
At the end of World War II, city officials in Spokane, Washington, had tried to acquire joint use of facilities at Geiger Field, Spokane which Air Training Command (ATC) had used as its Aviation Engineer Training Center. The Army Air Forces were opposed to sharing facilities with civilian authorities, so its headquarters directed ATC to transfer the training mission from Geiger Field to Fort Warren in Wyoming, and training stopped on 15 May 1947.

==== Air Training Command, 1947–1958 ====
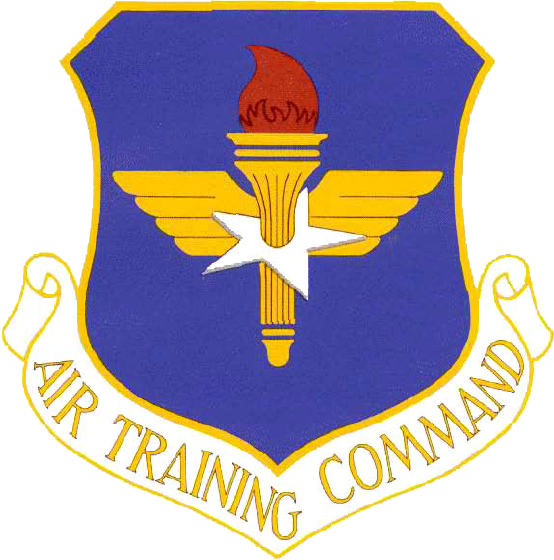
Air Training Command emblem

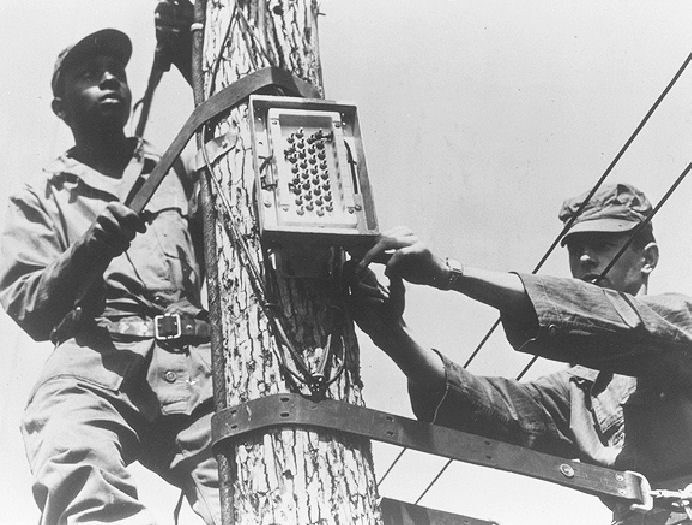
These student repairmen install a terminal box atop a telephone pole. This is an example of the practical training received in the ATC installer repairman phase of the fixed wire communications course at Francis E. Warren AFB.

On 1 June 1947 Air Training Command assumed jurisdiction of Fort Warren, the 463d Air Force Base Unit was activated to manage the support facilities, and the 3450th Technical Training Wing was activated for conducting training. Training began on 7 July 1947. In September 1947, Fort Warren, along with other Army Air Force facilities, was transferred into the newly established United States Air Force.

In March 1949, HQ ATC was directed to re-program, as a part of an overall restructuring to a 48-group Air Force. The statement of trained personnel requirements gave priority to radio, radar, armament, and aircraft maintenance training programs. ATC needed to find additional space for these courses. Air Force announced on 17 January (1949?) that all aviation engineering courses at Fort Warren, with the exception of "powerman", would transfer to the Army's Engineer School at Fort Belvoir, Virginia. The "fixed wire courses" at Scott AFB went to Fort Warren, so that Scott had room to expand its radio mechanic school.

On 7 October 1949, Fort Francis E. Warren became Francis E. Warren AFB. As a result of the Korean War, Air Training Command had to process thousands of volunteer reservists; between late July and the end of October 1950, about 20,000 reservists were brought on active duty, most of which was done at Warren AFB.

In 1957, in response to budget reductions, Air Training Command formed a base utilization board to examine all its facilities, looking at existing and future training requirements. That board concluded that two bases could be released —Francis E. Warren and Scott AFB, Illinois. Warren AFB had a number of strikes against it, including poor weather conditions limiting training to seven months of the year, lack of a flying field, and many inadequate buildings. In 1958, Air Training Command received permission from Headquarters USAF to phase out its training programs at Warren AFB.

Effective 1 February 1958, the base transferred from Air Training Command to Strategic Air Command. Training continued until 24 March 1959, and on 1 May ATC discontinued its 3450th Technical Training Group.

==== Strategic Air Command, 1958–2005 ====
The 389th Air Base Group was established on 1 February 1958 to take control of the former ATC facilities as part of the transfer to Strategic Air Command (SAC). The provisional 4320th Strategic Missile Wing was established that date with responsibility for 24 Atlas missile sites under SAC. Although not the first designated missile wing, Warren became the first fully operational ICBM base in the Air Force.

===== 706th/389th Strategic Missile Wing Atlas D and E missiles, 1958–1965 =====
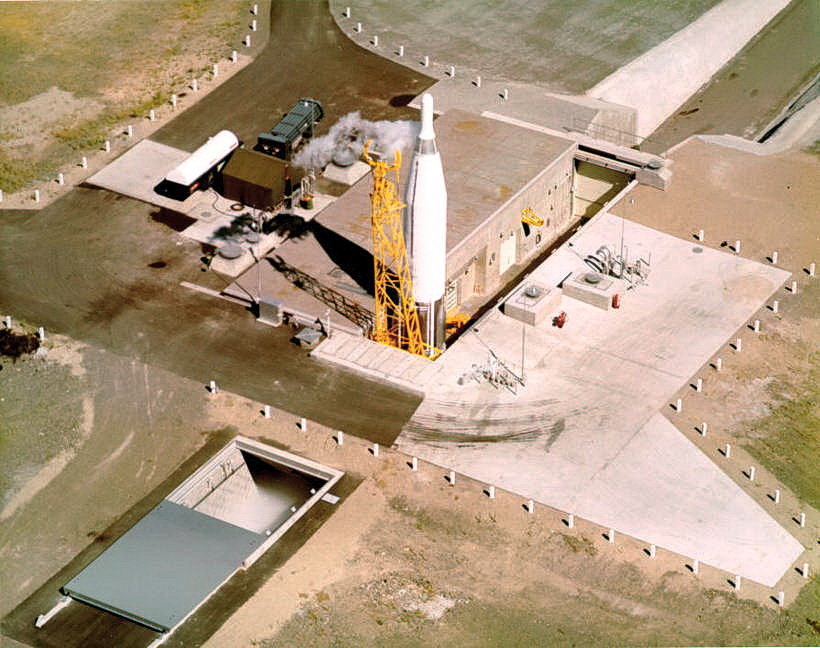
SM-65E Atlas launch site

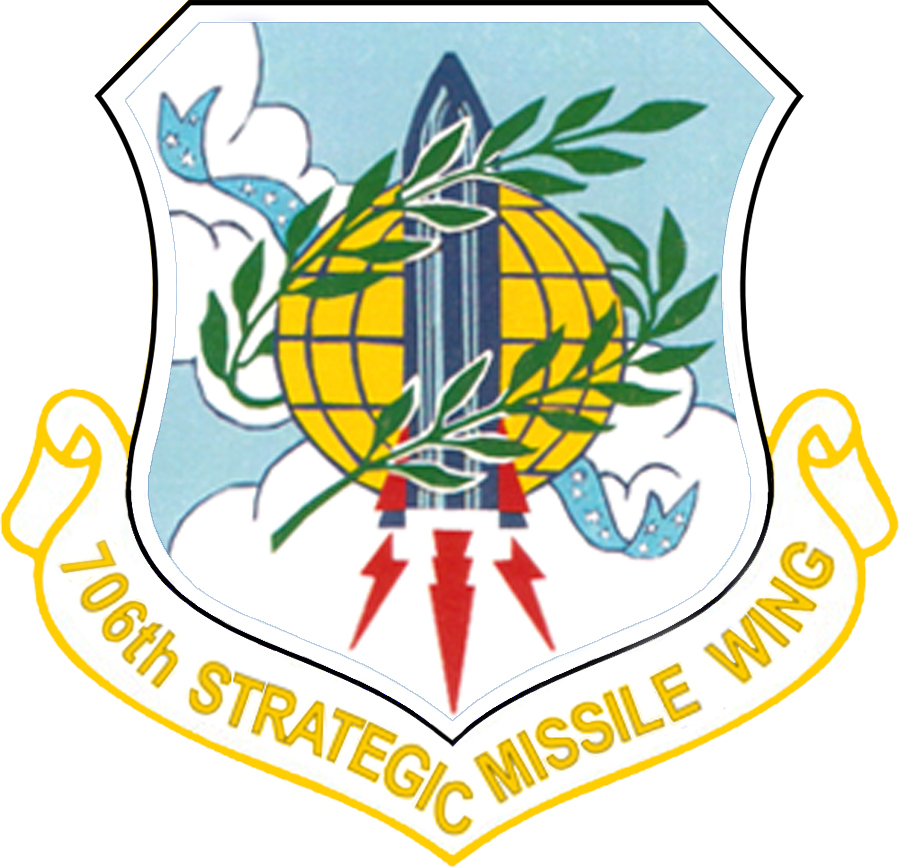
706th SMW insignia

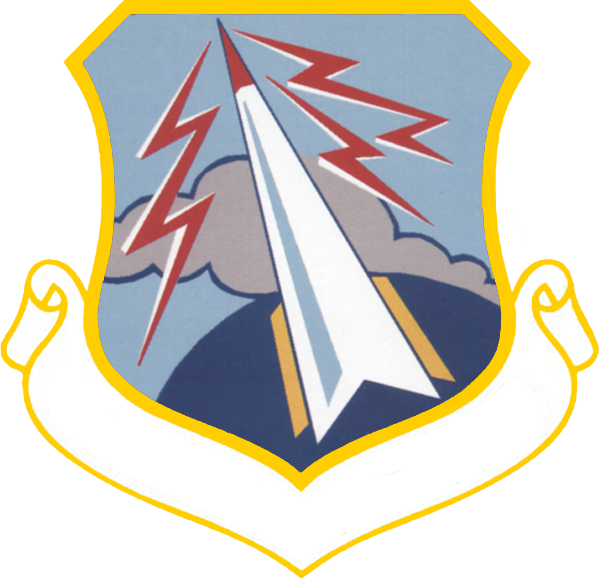
389th SMW insignia

The project design for the above-ground SM-65D Atlas ICBM launch and control facilities at "Site A" was to be completed by mid-May 1958 and construction finished in November 1959. Design revisions delayed the project several months. Construction began at a location 23 miles (37 km) northwest of Cheyenne in late 1958 for the facilities of the recently activated 706th Strategic Missile Wing, which would control the ICBMs. On 15 September 1959, the first Atlas D missile to deploy away from Vandenberg AFB, California, went to the 564th Strategic Missile Squadron stationed at the Warren I complex. A month later, Warren AFB became the recipient of the first air-transported Atlas missile. In the presence of General Power, the Commander in Chief of SAC, the first Atlas D complex was turned over to the 564th SMS and declared operational on 9 August 1960.

As work proceeded at the Warren I complex, the Army Corps of Engineers contracted for "Warren II" with three sites with three Atlas-D launchers at each in February 1959. The Warren II site was ready in the summer of 1960. The 565th Strategic Missile Squadron, activated on 1 December 1959, operated the nine launchers.

The Warren III site, designed for nine SM-65E Atlas missiles would be scattered over a 60-square-mile (160 km^{2}) area at single "coffin" launch sites. The term "coffin" was used because the missile laid on its side underground with the coffin roof at ground level. This configuration offered limited protection for the launcher. On 1 October 1960, the 549th Strategic Missile Squadron became the last Atlas-E SMS to be activated. The 549th SMS was re-designated 566th SMS on 1 July 1961. That same date the parent 706th Strategic Missile Wing stood down. Command responsibilities at Warren AFB were assumed by the recently activated 389th Strategic Missile Wing.

In May 1964, as the 565th and 565th SMS Atlas-D missiles were being phased out, the 389th Strategic Missile Wing received SAC's last operational readiness inspection for this system. In September 1964, SAC inactivated the 564th SMS. During March 1965, the 566th SMS Atlas-Es would also be deactivated, completing the phaseout of the Atlas Missile at Warren.

==== 90th Missile Wing Minuteman I, 1963–1974 ====
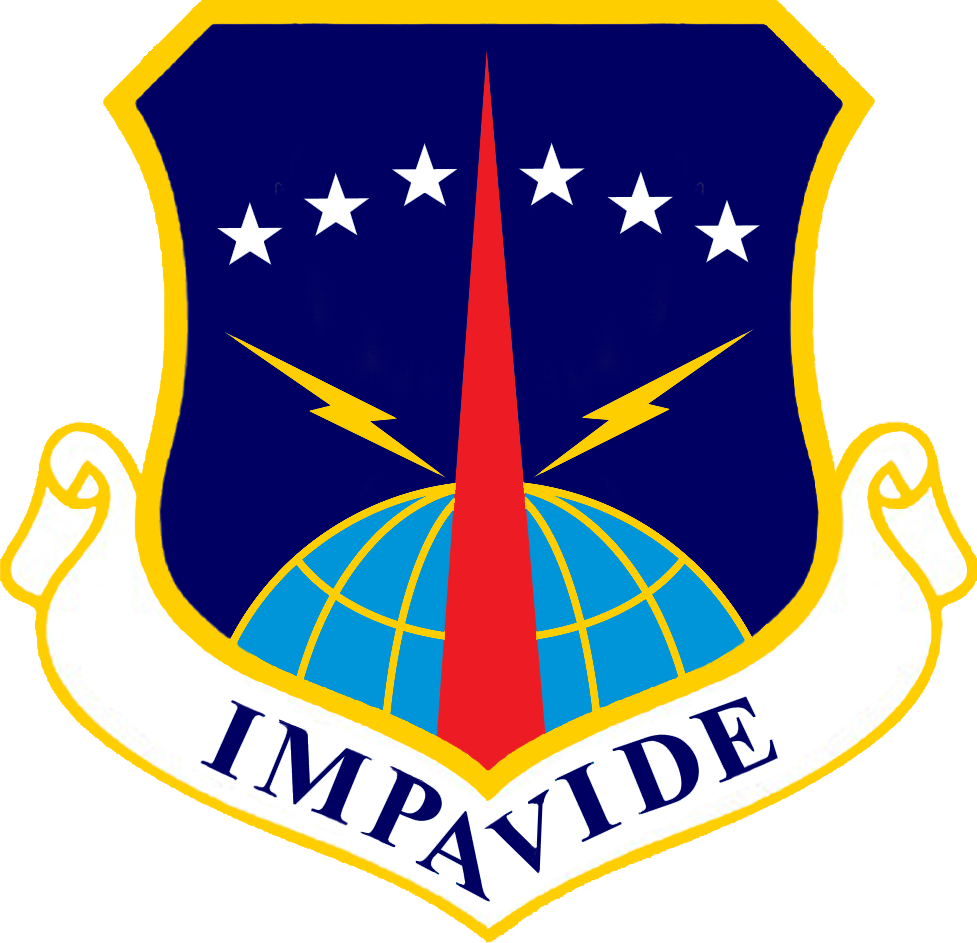
90th Missile Wing emblem

The departure of the Atlas squadrons did not mark the end of F.E. Warren's role in the ICBM program. On 15 October 1962, Morrison-Knudsen and Associates won the contract to construct 200 LGM-30A Minuteman I missile silos over an 8,300-square-mile (21,000 km^{2}) area of Wyoming, Nebraska, and Colorado, located north and east of the base. On 1 July 1963, the Air Force activated the 90th Strategic Missile Wing. Over the next year, four component strategic missile squadrons activated with the 400th SMS became the last Minuteman I "B" unit to stand up on 1 July 1964. In November 1972, SAC initiated the "Minuteman Integrated Improvement Program". The program entailed silo hardening and upgrading command data buffers in the launcher control facilities, which allowed for quicker missile re-targeting and a new version of the Minuteman missiles. After conversion to the LGM-30G Minuteman III, the last Minuteman IB model went off alert status in September 1974.

===== LGM-118 Peacekeeper missiles, 1982–2005 =====
Minuteman IIIs occupied the silos from 1974 to 1986. On 22 November 1982, President Ronald Reagan stated his decision in a statement for Congress, to deploy the MX missile dubbed "Peacekeeper" (later designated LGM-118 Peacekeeper) to superhardened silos located at Warren AFB. Capable of carrying up to 10 independently targeted nuclear warheads, the Peacekeeper was intended to strengthen the ground-based strategic policy of the U.S. The initial plan was to deploy 100 Peacekeepers in silos of the 400th and 319th Strategic Missile Squadrons. In July 1984, construction began for "Peacekeeper" support facilities at Warren AFB. From 1986 through 1988, 50 Peacekeepers would be backfitted into the silos occupied by Minuteman IIIs from 1974 to 1986 of the 400th Strategic Missile Squadron. During that time contamination was documented to propose the base to be listed as a superfund site on 7/14/1989.

In 2002, President George W. Bush set a plan in motion to reduce the country's missile forces from 6,000 to between 1,700 and 2,200. Russian president Vladimir Putin agreed to follow a similar plan, signing the Strategic Offensive Reductions Treaty. As part of this reduction, the Peacekeeper missiles were taken off alert and inactivated beginning in 2002 until 16 September 2005. The 400th Missile Squadron was inactivated on 19 September 2005.

==== Twentieth Air Force, 1991–present ====
The end of the Cold War and combat during Operation Desert Storm in 1991 resulted in significant changes to the organizational structure of the U.S. Air Force.

On 1 September 1991, Twentieth Air Force was reactivated by Strategic Air Command (SAC) and became responsible for all land-based Intercontinental Ballistic Missiles. On 1 June 1992, Warren transitioned from the inactivating SAC to newly established Air Combat Command, and on 1 July 1993 to the Air Force Space Command. This realignment was designed to take advantage of the similarities between missile launch and space launch operations. The 90th Strategic Missile Wing was also renamed the 90th Missile Wing. The wing became the 90th Space Wing on 1 October 1997.

In 1995, the 90th Missile Wing was the first missile base to upgrade Minuteman III launch control centers with the Rapid Execution And Combat Targeting modification. Existing launch control centers had not been upgraded significantly since the early 1960s. REACT replaced the command and control consoles with a single, integrated, computer-processing console. Improvements in automation allow combat crews to more rapidly process message traffic and carry out execution orders.

With the ratification of the Strategic Arms Reduction Treaty I, the U.S. had until December 2001 to reduce its nuclear arsenal. As a result, the 90th Missile Wing reduced the fleet from three 'reentry vehicles' permissible to a single reentry vehicle configuration. On 6 August 2001, all 150 Minuteman IIIs had been converted to a single reentry vehicle. Warren missile fields currently maintain 150 Minuteman III missiles, split evenly between the 319th, 320th, and 321st Missile Squadrons.

The 2005 Base Realignment and Closure commission (BRAC) did not recommend making any significant change to the base's current operations.

On 1 July 2008, the 90th Space Wing was re-designated the 90th Missile Wing, per the order of outgoing Air Force Chief of Staff General T. Michael Moseley as a way of refocusing the unit on the nuclear surety mission after the 2007 United States Air Force nuclear weapons incident.

On 1 December 2009 Twentieth Air Force was placed alongside all other U.S. ICBM and bombers with similar missions under a single command, the Air Force Global Strike Command, headquartered at Barksdale AFB, Louisiana.

On 23 October 2010, communications between the base and 50 missiles were partially disrupted for a short time due to a hardware failure.

The Air Force has begun construction of a new underground nuclear weapons storage and handling facility at F.E. Warren Air Force Base in Cheyenne, Wyoming.

The new Weapons Storage and Maintenance Facility (WSMF; sometimes called Weapons Generation Facility), which will replace the current Weapons Storage Area (WSA), will be a 90,000-square-foot reinforced concrete and earth-covered facility with supporting surface structures.

The Air Force says the new facility "will provide a safer and more secure facility for the storage of U. S. Air Force (USAF) assets", a reference to W78/Mk12A and W87/Mk21 warheads for the Minuteman III ICBMs deployed in Warren AFB's 150 missile silos. In the future, if Congress agrees to fund it, the new W87-1 warhead will replace the W78.

The $144 million contract was awarded to Fluor Corporation by the U.S. Army Corps of Engineers in 2018.

Construction of the underground storage facility at F.E. Warren AFB follows the completion in 2012 of a massive underground nuclear weapons storage facility at the Strategic Weapons Facility Pacific (SWFPAC) next to the Kitsap Naval Submarine Base. Underground storage facilities are also planned at other bases.

=== Challenge of maintenance, upgrade ===
Aging equipment such as analog phone lines or computer systems that still use floppy discs have become a subject of media attention; Former missileers alerted the US television program 60 Minutes, which aired a segment about Warren AFB on 27 April 2014. The USAF plans to spend $19 million on improvements of Warren AFB missile silos and launch control centers in 2014, and is asking for over $600 million in 2015. The Congressional Budget Office has estimated a cost of $355 billion to upgrade the triad of the U.S. nuclear weapons systems including ICBMs, submarines and bombers.

The base is recorded on the list of Superfund sites in Wyoming because of contaminated land on the site.

=== Previous names ===
- Established as Fort D.A. Russell, 4 July 1867 (United States Army)

Renamed Fort Francis E. Warren, 1 January 1930
Came under USAAF control, 31 May 1947

- Francis E. Warren Air Force Base, 7 October 1949–present

=== Major commands to which assigned ===
- Air Training Command, 31 May 1947
- Strategic Air Command, 1 February 1958
- Air Combat Command, 1 June 1992
- Air Force Space Command, 1 July 1993
- Air Force Global Strike Command, 7 August 2009 – present

=== Base operating units ===
- 463d AF Base Unit, 1 June 1947
- 3450th Air Base Gp, 26 August 1948
- 389th Air Base Gp, 1 February 1958 (rdsgd 389th Combat Support Gp, 1 January 1959)
- 809th Combat Support Gp, 1 July 1963
- 90th Combat Support Gp (redesignated 90th Mission Support Group), 1 August 1972 – present

=== Major units assigned ===
- USAF Aviation Engineering School, 1 June 1947 – 1 May 1959
- 3450th Technical Training Wing, 26 August 1948 – 1 February 1958
- 4320th Strategic Wing, 1 February 1958

Redesignated 706th Strategic Missile Wing, 23 February 1958
Redesignated 389th Strategic Missile Wing, 1 July 1961 – 25 March 1965

- 13th Air Division, 1 July 1959

Redesignated: 13th Strategic Missile Division, 1 January 1963 – 2 July 1966

- 90th Strategic Missile Wing, 1 July 1963

Redesignated 90th Missile Wing, 1 September 1991
Redesignated 90th Space Wing, 1 October 1992
Redesignated 90th Missile Wing, 1 July 2008 – present

- 809th Combat Support Group, 21 February 1963 – 31 July 1972
- 4th Strategic Missile Division, 30 June 1971 – 23 August 1988
- Twentieth Air Force, 1 September 1991 – present

=== Intercontinental ballistic missile facilities ===
- 389th Strategic Missile Wing

SM-65 AtlasD/E, 1960–1965

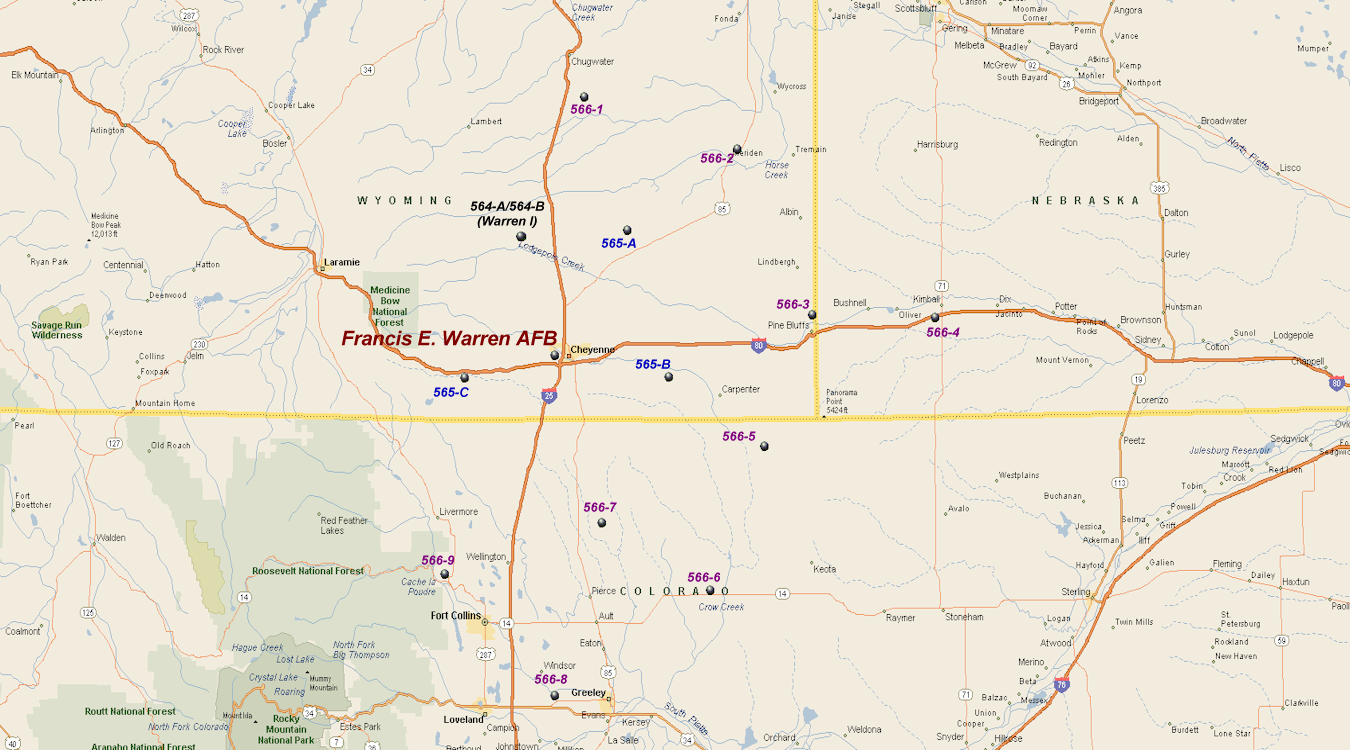
SM-65 Atlas sites of the 706th/389th Strategic Missile Wing 564th SMS Atlas-D (black) 565th SMS Atlas-D (blue) 566th SMS Atlas-E (purple)

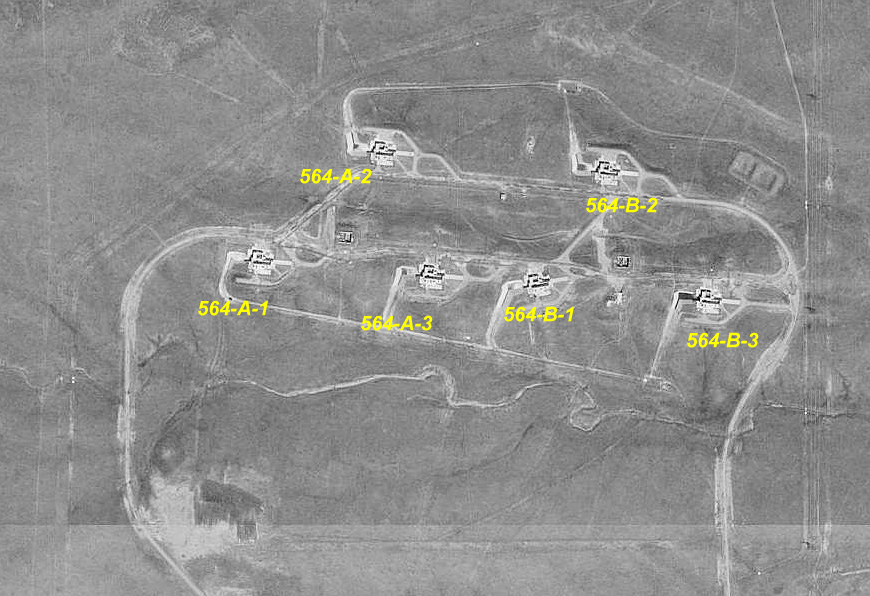
SM-65D Atlas missile site Warren I, northwest of Warren AFB

564th Strategic Missile Squadron (6 missiles)

564-A, 10.6 mi NW of Federal WY 41°22′44″N 104°58′25″W
564-B, 10.6 mi NW of Federal WY 41°22′43″N 104°58′07″W

565th Strategic Missile Squadron (9 missiles)

565-A, 15.1 mi NW of Hillsdale WY 41°23′32″N 104°38′30″W
565-B, 8.2 mi WNW of Carpenter WY 41°05′22″N 104°30′42″W
565-C, 4.8 mi W of Granite Canon WY 41°05′08″N 105°08′45″W

566th Strategic Missile Squadron (9 missiles)

566–1, 6.5 mi SSE of Chugwater, WY 41°40′07″N 104°46′37″W
566–2, 8.8 mi SW of LaGrange, WY 41°33′39″N 104°17′56″W
566–3, 2.5 mi N of Pine Bluffs, WY 41°13′05″N 104°03′56″W
566–4, 2.2 mi SW of Kimball, NE 41°12′36″N 103°41′09″W
566–5, 5.1 mi N of Grover, CO 40°56′44″N 104°12′57″W
566–6, 3.2 mi WNW of Briggsdale, CO 40°38′56″N 104°23′04″W
566–7, 6.7 mi NNE of Nunn, CO 40°47′17″N 104°43′10″W
566–8, 1.9 mi W of Greeley, CO 40°25′46″N 104°51′42″W
566–9, 8.8 mi NW of Fort Collins, CO 40°40′43″N 105°12′13″W

Due to the remoteness of the locations where they were constructed in the late 1950s and early 1960s, the Warren Atlas sites have not been redeveloped since their closure in 1965. The 564th SMS A/B Warren I site is completely abandoned. The public road "Atlas Road" ends at a fence with a "No Trespassing" sign about 2 or 3 miles (4.8 km) from the actual site, and the road past the gate appears to be well cracked and vegetation is growing out of the unmaintained surface. The site itself, which is in private ownership, when viewed from aerial images looks as if it has been abandoned for decades, The above ground launchers and support structures left as they were when inactivated nearly 50 years ago. Roofs of some structures still exist, others do not. The access roads are very deteriorated as well, with large areas of vegetation growing though the cracks in the surface.

The other Atlas-D sites for the 565th SMS are all intact, sites A and C appear to be unused although both are in private hands. Site B has large numbers of abandoned vehicles on it, although again, all of the facilities appear to be still intact. The Atlas-E sites appear to be intact, all in private hands, and other than being overgrown, appear to have been left to the elements and time since 1965.

- 90th Missile Wing

LGM-30B Minuteman I, 1964–1974
LGM-30G Minuteman III, 1973–present
Missile Alert Facilities (MAF) (each controlling 10 missiles) are as follows:

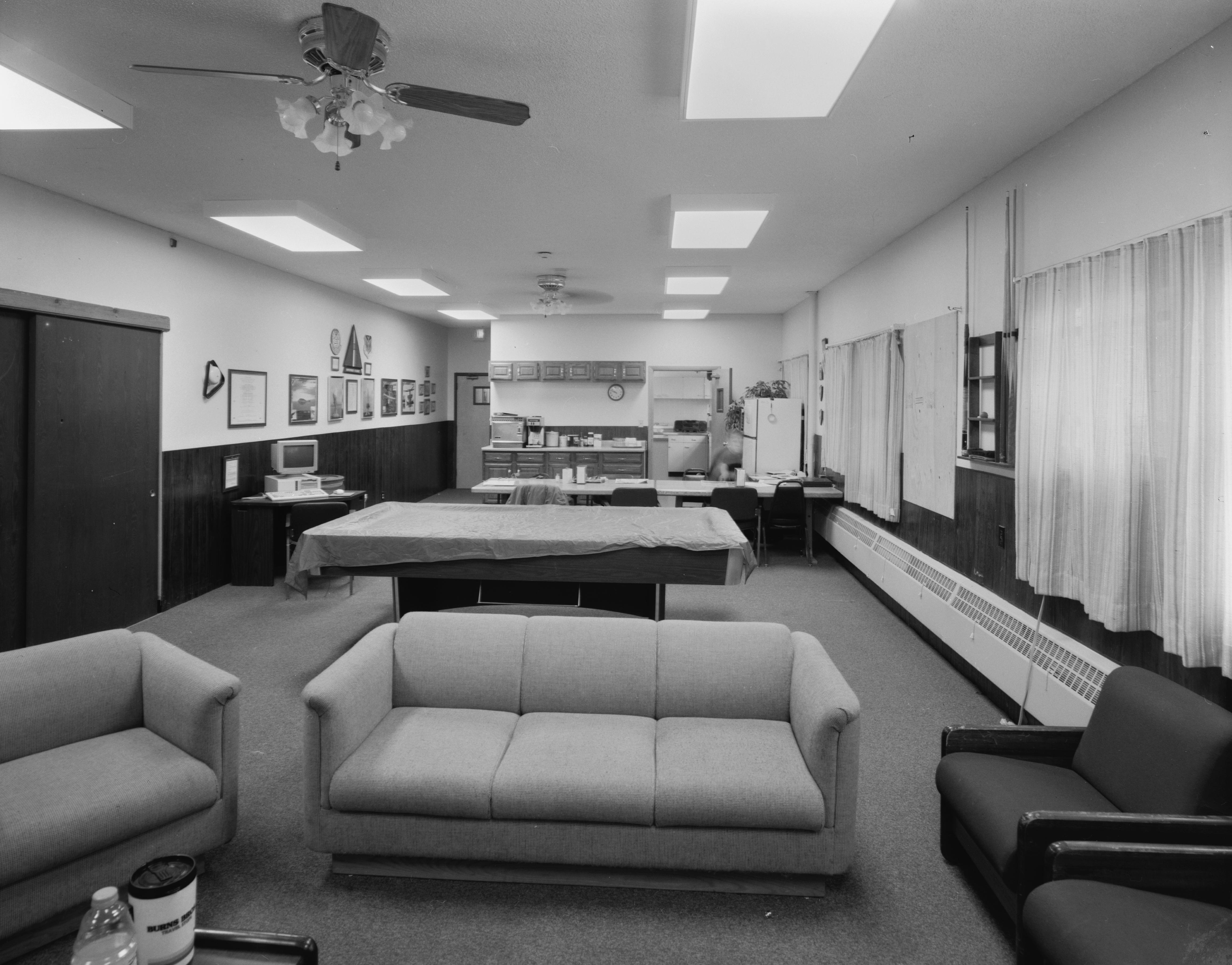
Recreation Room, Launch Control Support building N-01 near Raymer, Colorado

319th Missile Squadron
320th Missile Squadron
321st Missile Squadron

- LGM-118A Peacekeeper, 1987–2005.

With the deployment of the LGM-118A, 50 former Minuteman III silos were converted. 400th Strategic Missile Squadron Flights P through T were reassigned to the Peacekeeper for operational duty.

P-01, 18.0 mi N of Hillsdale WY, 41°28′20″N 104°28′04″W
Q-01, 15.4 mi SxSW of Chugwater WY 41°32′35″N 104°54′10″W
R-01, 16.4 mi NW of Meriden WY, 41°44′17″N 104°30′00″W
S-01, 4.8 mi SE of Yoder WY, 41°52′23″N 104°13′20″W
T-01, 9.1 mi ExSE of Wheatland WY, 41°59′51″N 104°47′30″W

- Complete list of 90th MW Minuteman/Peacekeeper missile Sites

Since their closure in the early 2000s (decade), the Peacekeeper Missile Alert Facilities all have been turned over to the GSA for disposition. All appear to be intact and in government hands. The locked gates and fences surround abandoned buildings which appear in good condition. The 50 launch silos (Launch Facilities) have all been imploded, then graded. Other than a road leading to the former site, most of which are still fenced and are still government owned, nothing more than natural vegetation is there in aerial imagery.

== Role and operations ==
=== LGM-30G Minuteman III operations ===
The 90th Missile Wing was activated 1 July 1963, with the original designation as 90th Strategic Missile Wing. It was the nation's first operational Intercontinental Ballistic Missile base with the 1958 introduction of the SM-65D Atlas missile. Today, the 90th MW operates 150 LGM-30G Minuteman III ICBMs on full, constant alert.

The 90 MW is organized into four groups:

==== 90th Operations Group ====
The 90th Operations Group consists of more than 550 operators, facility managers, and support personnel, three missile squadrons, an operations support squadron, a helicopter squadron and a standardization and evaluation element. Each tactical missile squadron is responsible for five missile alert facilities and 50 Minuteman III ICBMs. The units of the 90th Operations Group include the 319th Missile Squadron, 320th Missile Squadron, 321st Missile Squadron and 90th Operations Support Squadron.

==== 90th Maintenance Group ====
The 90th Maintenance Group provides Minuteman III ICBMs along with command and control systems required to launch those missiles. The group maintains 150 missiles and associated launch facilities, as well as 15 launch control facilities spread between a three-state, 9,600 square-mile complex.

==== 90th Mission Support Group ====
The 90th Mission Support Group provides combat support to the 90th Missile Wing. The 1,000 men and women of the group provide civil engineering, transportation and logistics, communications, contracting, and personnel and services support.

==== 90th Security Forces Group ====
The 90th Security Forces Group provides continuous security for the 90th Missile Wing. The mission of the 90 SFG includes the protection of F. E. Warren AFB, 15 Missile Alert Facilities (MAFs) and 150 Minuteman III Intercontinental Ballistic Missiles (ICBMs) on constant 24-hour alert throughout a 9,600 square-mile area spanning three states. The 90th SFG also sustains a combat-ready force deployable worldwide in support of wartime and peacetime taskings. The 90th Security Forces Group comprises five squadrons: 790th Security Forces Squadron, 90th Ground Combat Training Squadron, 90th Missile Security Forces Squadron, 90th Security Forces Squadron, 90th Security Support Squadron.

The 790th Missile Security Forces Squadron provides security for convoys and missile maintenance operations. The 90th Ground Combat Training Squadron is located in Guernsey, Wyo., and provides security, pre-deployment, and antiterrorism/force protection training for USAF personnel. The 90th Missile Security Forces Squadron provides security for 15 missile alert facilities and 150 launch facilities. The 90th Security Forces Squadron provides installation and weapons storage area security; police services; pass and registration functions; and reports and analysis duties. The 90th Security Support Squadron provides command and control for the missile field and access control for all missile field forces as well as all security forces training and equipment support.

==== Tenant units ====
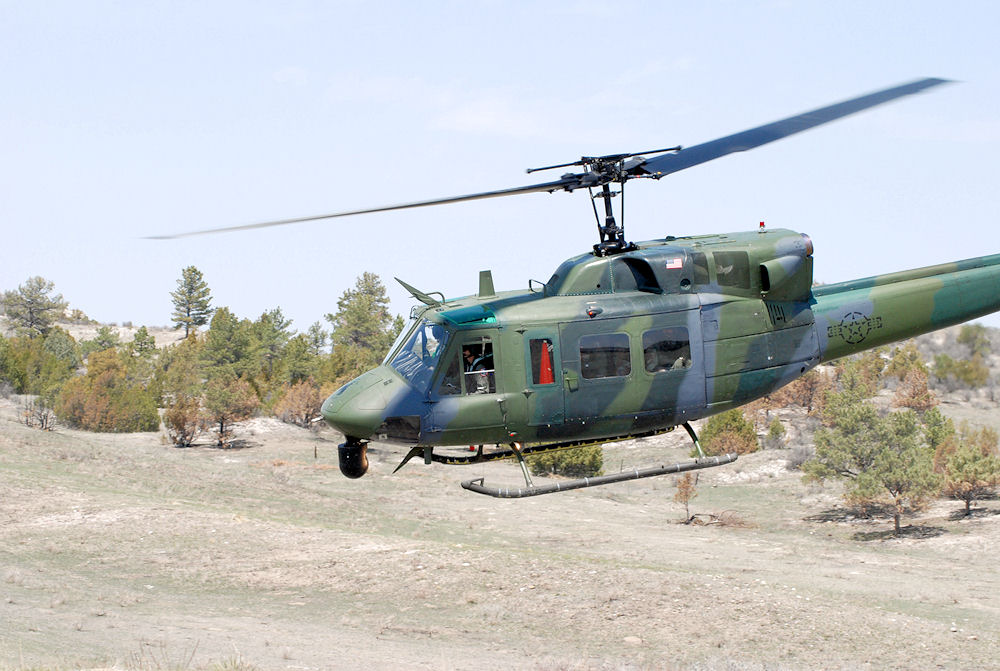
A UH-1 Iroquois (Huey) helicopter used by 37th Helicopter Squadron of the 90th Operations Group.

The 153rd Command and Control Squadron (Wyoming Air National Guard) provides command, control, communications, computers and intelligence to the commander of the United States Northern Command.

The 582nd Helicopter Group Headquarters includes the 37th Helicopter Squadron has dual responsibilities to Air Force Global Strike Command and United States Strategic Command. As the missile "Numbered Air Force" for AFGSC, 20th Air Force is responsible for maintaining and operating the Air Force's ICBM force. Designated as STRATCOM's Task Force 214, 20th Air Force provides ICBMs to the president.

=== Airfield facilities ===
Unlike most Air Force Bases, Warren AFB has no paved runway for fixed-wing aircraft. The only conventional airfield ever located at F. E. Warren AFB was a single dirt strip. This field, never used by modern-day pilots, was made famous by World War I ace Captain Eddie Rickenbacker who crashed his plane on the field and survived. The airfield was used in 1919 by the "Western Flying Circus", led by then-Major Carl "Tooey" Spaatz. The base maintains two active 100 ft × 100 ft helipads, utilized by Air Force UH-1N Twin Huey helicopters of the 37th Helicopter Squadron to conduct tactical presence and response missions. The base additionally maintains a pair of small turf STOL runways south of the helipads as a training area.

== Based units ==
Flying and notable non-flying units based at Francis E. Warren Air Force Base.

Units marked GSU are Geographically Separate Units, which although based at Warren, are subordinate to a parent unit based at another location.

=== United States Air Force ===
Air Force Global Strike Command (AFGSC)

- Twentieth Air Force
  - Headquarters Twentieth Air Force
  - 90th Missile Wing
    - 90th Operations Group
      - 90th Operations Support Squadron
      - 319th Missile Squadron – LGM-30G Minuteman-III
      - 320th Missile Squadron – LGM-30G Minuteman-III
      - 321st Missile Squadron – LGM-30G Minuteman-III
    - 90th Maintenance Group
      - 90th Missile Maintenance Squadron
      - 90th Munitions Squadron
      - 790th Maintenance Squadron
      - Maintenance Quality Assurance Section
    - 90th Medical Group
      - 90th Medical Operations Squadron
      - 90th Medical Support Squadron
    - 90th Mission Support Group
      - 90th Civil Engineer Squadron
      - 90th Communications Squadron
      - 90th Contracting Squadron
      - 90th Force Support Squadron.
      - 90th Logistics Readiness Squadron
    - 90th Security Forces Group
      - 90th Missile Security Forces Squadron
      - 90th Security Forces Squadron
      - 90th Security Support Squadron
      - 790th Missile Security Forces Squadron
      - 890th Missile Security Forces Squadron
    - 582nd Helicopter Group
      - 37th Helicopter Squadron – UH-1N Iroquois
      - 582nd Operations Support Squadron

Air National Guard (ANG)

- Wyoming Air National Guard
  - 153rd Airlift Wing
    - 153rd Command and Control Squadron (GSU)

== Geography ==
According to the United States Census Bureau, the base has a total area of 5.0 square miles (13 km^{2}), of which, 5.0 square miles (13 km^{2}) of it is land and 0.04 square miles (0.10 km^{2}) of it is water. The total area is 0.79% water.

== Environmental contamination ==
Due to extensive soil and groundwater contamination, the Warren AFB has been a superfund site listed on the National Priorities List (NPL) since 21 February 1990. Trichloroethylene (TCE) used to degrease equipment was found in groundwater in the West Cheyenne area from Belvoir Ranch to about 10 miles to the east of the site during the 1990s, as on numerous other military installations. As of 2014, the DOD has spent $15.8 million on the preliminary phase of the West Cheyenne Superfund Site over the past decade, installing monitoring wells, containing and passively treating water, and a feasibility study on installing "interceptor wells".

A Restoration Advisory Board is established. The extent of the underground TCE plume is unknown; data analysis due to be completed 2015 will inform about its size. The Army Corps of Engineers, who built the ICBM launch site in the 1950s, has been involved in investigation and clean up since 1989; the project manager for the Corps estimated in 2014 "it will likely be a more than 100- or 200-year effort to actually remove the chemicals from the groundwater". Atlas missile site No. 3 was acquired in the late '70s and used as a car salvage yard. It was not until 2001 when the Corps began investigating Cheyenne missile sites for TCE contamination, that a "1.5-mile-long contamination plume at the site, [was found] and interest in the property evaporated. The clean up is expected to cost $175 million." In 2015, the Corps stated that it wants to collect more data before recommending a remedy.

== Demographics ==
At the 2010 census base population had shrunk by more than 25% to 3,072. At the census of 2000, there had been 4,440 people, 639 households, and 631 families residing on the base. The population density was 888.3 people per square mile (343.0 people/km^{2}). There were 735 housing units at an average density of 147.0 per square mile (56.8/km^{2}). The racial makeup of the base was 79.6% White, 9.4% African American, 0.5% Native American, 2.2% Asian, 0.3% Pacific Islander, 4.4% from other races, and 3.6% from two or more races. Hispanic or Latino people of any race were 8.8% of the population. There were 639 households, 82% of which had children under the age of 18 living with them, 92.2% were married couples living together, 4.1% had a female householder with no husband present, and 1.1% were made up of individuals. The average household size was 3.59 and the average family size was 3.58.

On the base the population was spread out, with 23.0% under the age of 18, 26.7% from 18 to 24, 48.4% from 25 to 44, and 1.8% from 45 to 64. The median age was 25 years. For every 100 females, there were 201.2 males. For every 100 females age 18 and over, there were 259.4 males.

The median income for a household on the base was $32,589, and the median income for a family was $32,946. Males had a median income of $25,247 versus $20,819 for females. The per capita income for the base was $18,426. About 2.2% of families and 2.4% of the population were below the poverty line, including 2.6% of those under the age of 18.

== See also ==
- List of Superfund sites in Wyoming
- List of United States Air Force installations

== Other sources ==
- This article incorporates public domain material from the Air Force Historical Research Agency
- This article incorporates public domain material from F.E. Warren Air Force Base. United States Air Force.
- Manning, Thomas A. (2005), History of Air Education and Training Command, 1942–2002. Office of History and Research, Headquarters, AETC, Randolph AFB, Texas OCLC 71006954, 29991467
- Maurer, Maurer. Air Force Combat Units of World War II. Washington, DC: U.S. Government Printing Office 1961 (republished 1983, Office of Air Force History, ISBN 0-912799-02-1).
- Mueller, Robert, Air Force Bases Volume I, Active Air Force Bases Within the United States of America on 17 September 1982, Office of Air Force History, 1989
- Ravenstein, Charles A. Air Force Combat Wings Lineage and Honors Histories 1947–1977. Maxwell Air Force Base, Alabama: Office of Air Force History 1984. ISBN 0-912799-12-9.
