= Eric Brown (rugby union) =

Rugby union player from Northern Ireland

- Full name: Eric Lawrence Brown
- Born: 6 September 1930 Belfast, Northern Ireland

Rugby union career
- Position: Wing-forward
International career
Years	Team	Apps	(Points)
1958	Ireland	1	(0)

Eric Lawrence Brown (born 6 September 1930), also known as Bolo Brown, is an Irish former international rugby union player of the 1950s.

Born in Belfast, Brown was an Instonians captain and gained his only Ireland cap in a 1958 Five Nations match against France at Colombes, playing as a wing-forward. He was a sports master at Annadale Grammar School and co-coached their XV to a first ever Ulster Schools Cup title in 1958.

== See also ==
- List of Ireland national rugby union players
