= Global Strike Challenge =

The United States Air Force's Global Strike Challenge is an annual competition where different sections of the Air Force compete in a series of challenges to prove their speed and readiness. Until 201 it was known as the Guardian Challenge.

== See also ==
- United States Air Force Missile Combat Competition
- LGM-30 Minuteman
- LGM-25C Titan II
