= 400th Missile Squadron =

Coordinates: 41°07′59″N 104°52′01″W

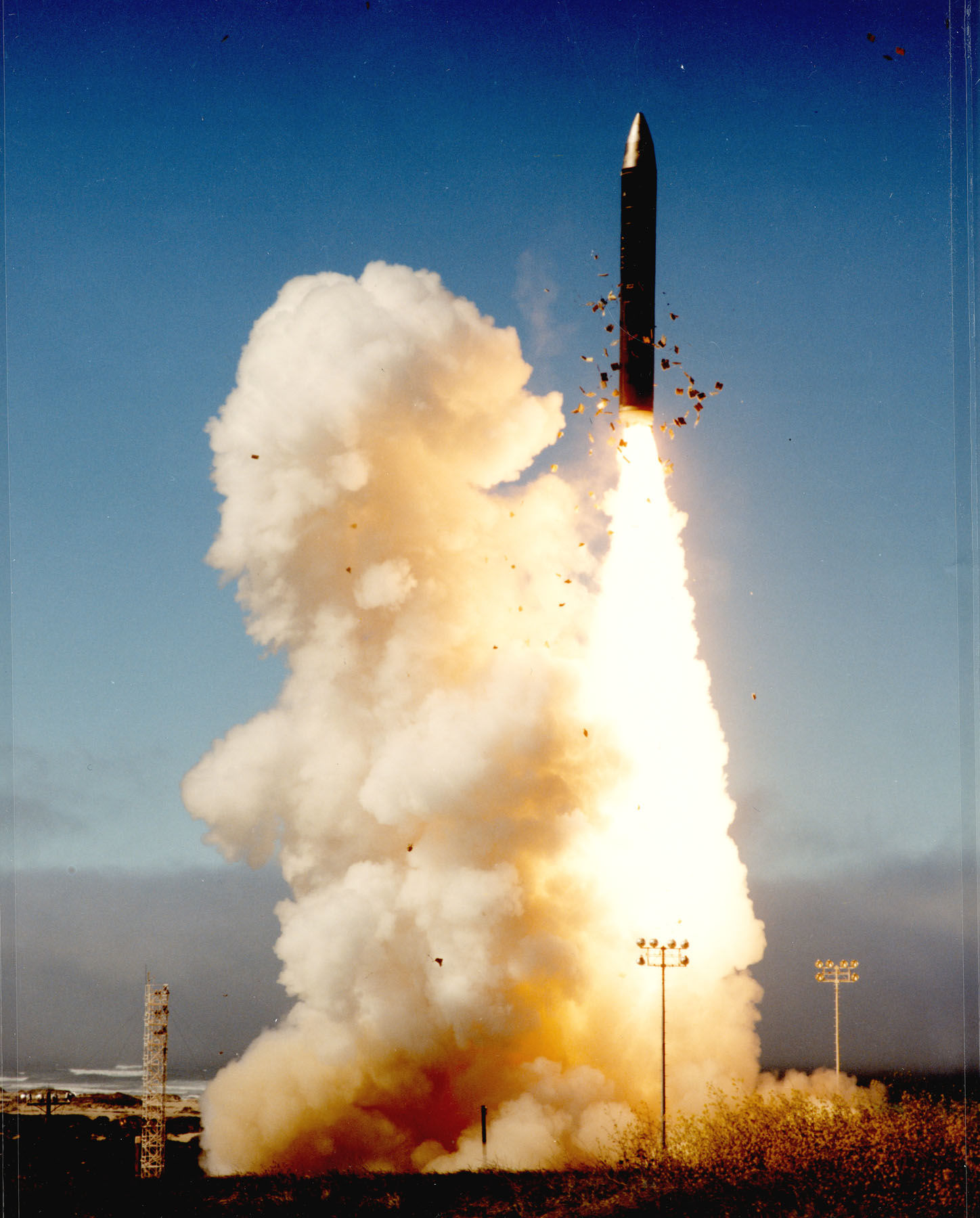
- LGM-118A Peacekeeper Test Launch at Vandenberg AFB, California
- Active: 1942-1946; 1947-1948; 1964-2005
- Country: United States
- Branch: United States Air Force
- Type: Squadron
- Role: Intercontinental ballistic missile
- Nickname: Black Pirates (World War II)
- Engagements: Southwest Pacific Theater
- Decorations: Distinguished Unit Citation; Air Force Outstanding Unit Award; Philippine Presidential Unit Citation

Insignia
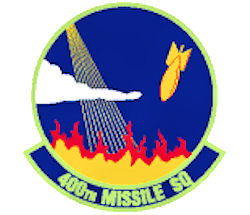
- 400th Missile Squadron emblem (Note: Approved 17 November 1994.)

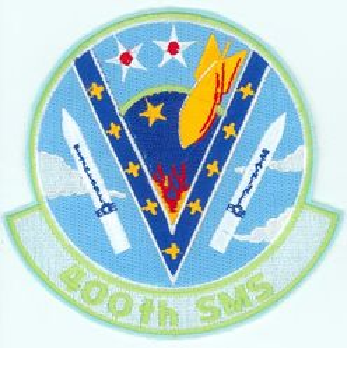
- 400th Strategic Missile Squadron emblem. (Note: Approved 25 February 1966.)

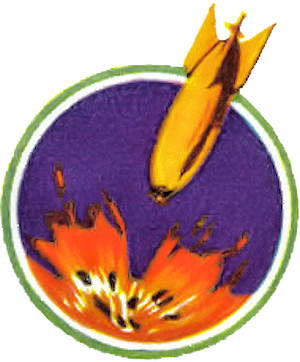
- 400th Bombardment Squadron emblem (Note: Approved 10 April 1943.)

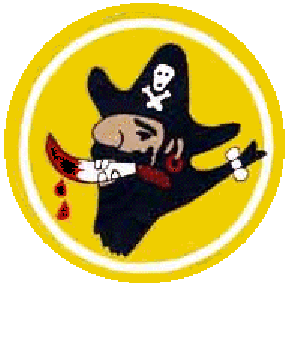
- Unofficial 400th Bombardment Squadron emblem used in the Pacific (Note: The 90th Bombardment Group "Jolly Rogers" emblem was also used as a squadron patch and as a tail marking on B-24s with each squadron having its own color in the background. Watkins, pp. 86-87.)

The 400th Missile Squadron is an inactive United States Air Force unit. It was last assigned to the 90th Operations Group at Francis E. Warren Air Force Base, Wyoming, where it was inactivated in 2005.

The squadron was first activated as the 10th Reconnaissance Squadron in 1942. Soon renamed the 400th Bombardment Squadron, it flew Consolidated B-24 Liberators in the Pacific during World War II, where it earned two Distinguished Unit Citations and a Philippine Republic Presidential Unit Citation for its actions in combat. After VJ Day, the squadron remained in the Philippines until January 1946, when it was inactivated.

The squadron was activated again in 1964 as the 400th Strategic Missile Squadron, an LGM-30B Minuteman I intercontinental ballistic missile squadron. In 1973 it modernized its Minutemen and in 1986 became the only operational squadron in the Air Force to equip with the LGM-118A Peacekeeper. The squadron was inactivated when the Peacekeeper was removed from the inventory in September 2005, during the implementation of the Strategic Arms Reduction Treaty.

== History ==
=== World War II ===
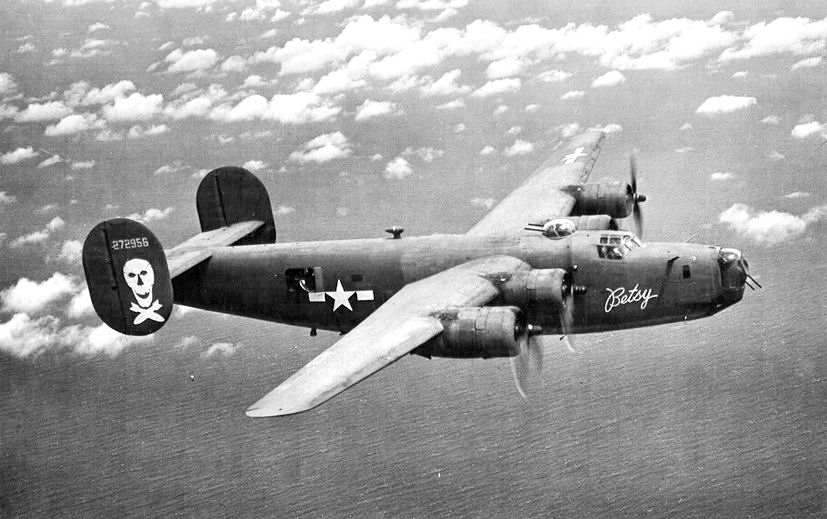
B-24D-170-CO Liberator 42-72956 on Mission to Wewak, New Guinea, 24 February 1944

The squadron was first organized as the 10th Reconnaissance Squadron at Key Field, Mississippi in April 1942 as a Consolidated B-24 Liberator unit and one of the original squadrons of the 90th Bombardment Group. Within a week the squadron name was changed to the 400th Bombardment Squadron. The squadron trained with Liberators in the southeastern United States under III Bomber Command until August.

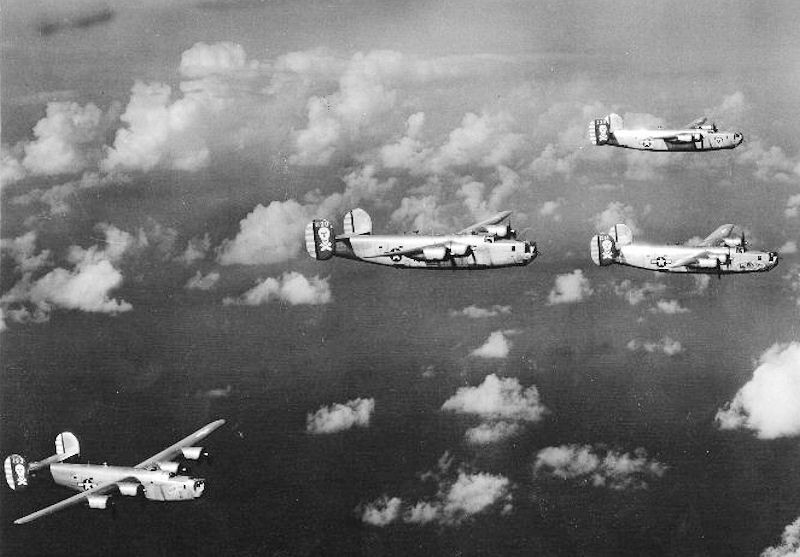
"Jolly Rogers" of the 90th Bombardment Group on a mission, 1943

The squadron moved to Willow Run Airport, Michigan for conversion training on newly manufactured Ford Liberators. Assigned to VII Bomber Command with B-24Ds, the unit moved to Hickam Field, Hawaii in September. The squadron arrived in northern Queensland, Australia in November 1942 and began bombardment missions under V Bomber Command almost immediately.

The squadron attacked enemy airfields, troop concentrations, ground installations and shipping in New Guinea, the Bismarck Archipelago, Palau and the southern Philippines. The 400th was awarded a Distinguished Unit Citation for its operations in Papua between through January 1943. The unit participated in the Battle of Bismarck Sea in March 1943, and earned another citation for strikes on enemy airfields at Wewak, New Guinea in September 1943 despite heavy flak and fighter opposition.

During 1944, the 400th supported the New Guinea Campaign through the end of June, then made long-range raids on oil refineries at Balikpapan, Borneo, in September and October. In January 1945, the squadron moved to the Philippines and supported ground forces on Luzon, attacked industrial targets on Formosa, and bombed railways, airfields, and harbor facilities on the Asiatic mainland. Shortly before the end of the war in the Pacific, the 90th moved to Okinawa, from which it would be able to strike the Japanese home islands.

After VJ Day, the squadron flew reconnaissance missions over Japan and ferried Allied prisoners of war from Okinawa to Manila. It ceased operations by November 1945. The squadron was inactivated in the Philippines in early 1946.

=== Intercontinental Ballistic Missiles ===
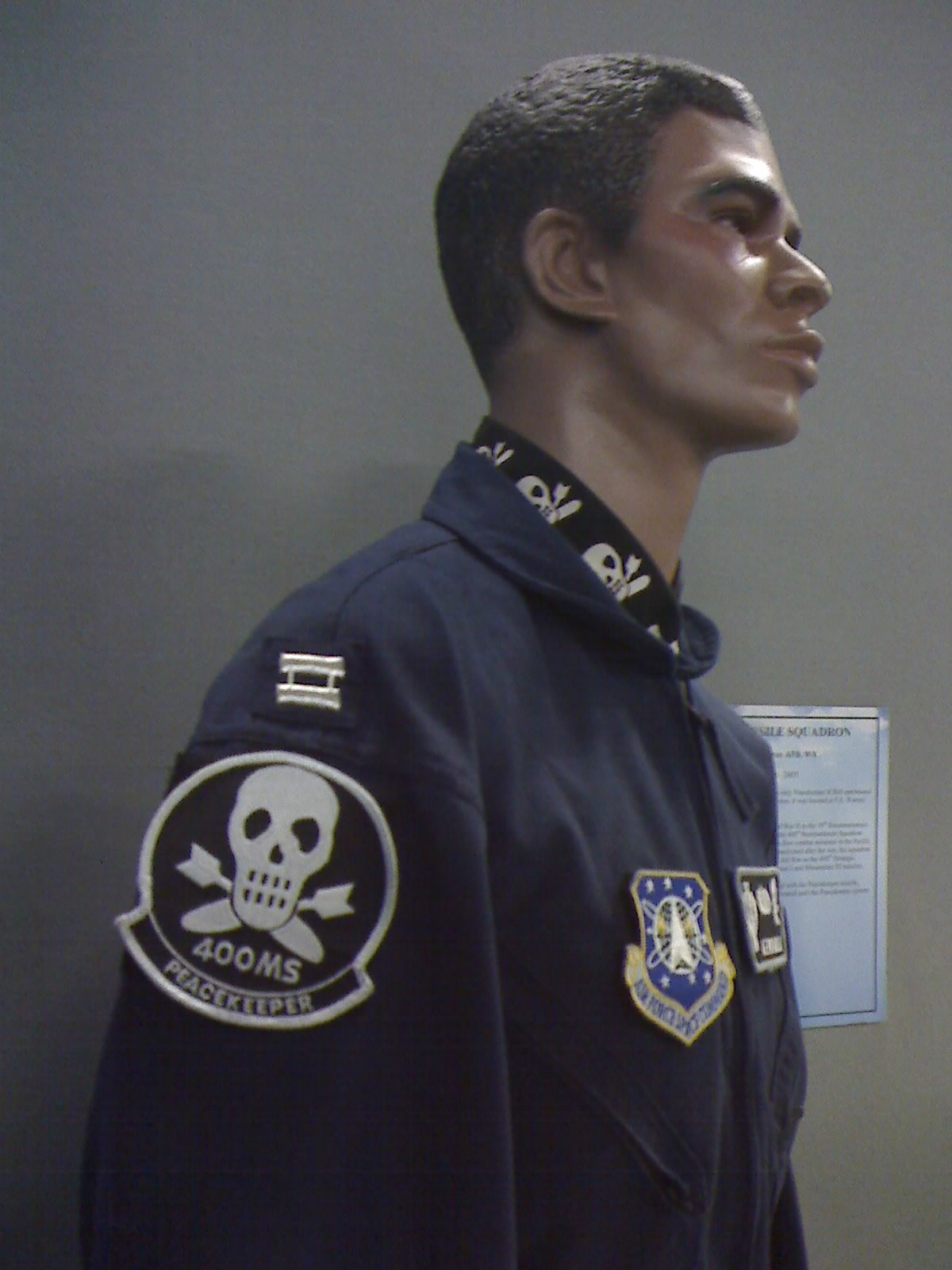
Uniform showing an alternative "skull and missiles" shoulder patch.

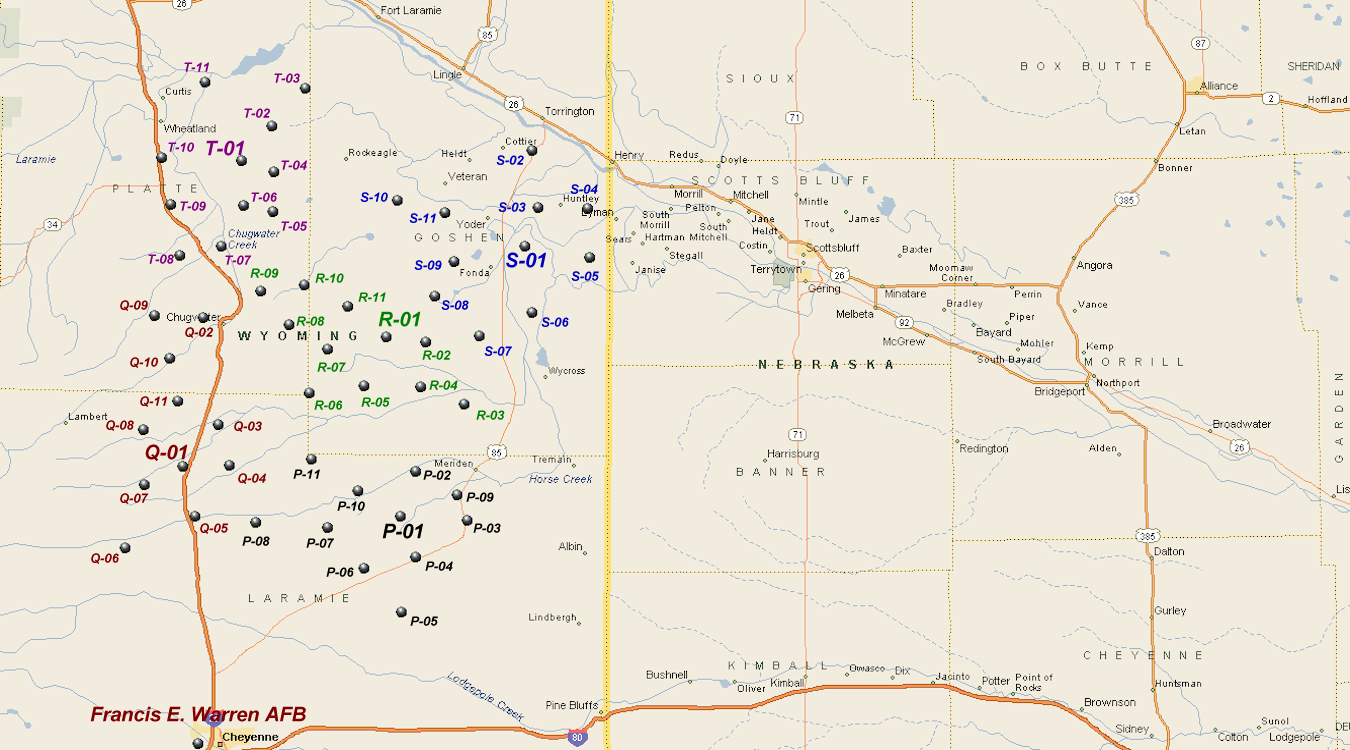
LGM-30 Minuteman/LGM-118A Peacekeeper Missile Alert and Launch Facilities

The squadron was reactivated on 1 July 1964 as an intercontinental ballistic missile squadron assigned to the 90th Strategic Missile Wing at Francis E. Warren Air Force Base, Wyoming, and equipped with fifty LGM-30B Minuteman Is, equipped with a single reentry vehicle. The squadron was the last of the 90th Wing's four Minuteman squadrons to activate. Beginning in June 1973, its Minuteman I missiles began to be replaced by LGM-30G Minuteman IIIs, which could carry up to three reentry vehicles, and it became the first Minuteman III squadron in the wing.

LGM-118 Peacekeeper personnel training and facility preparation began in June 1985. The Peacekeeper, which could carry ten independently targeted reentry vehicles, was fully operational with the squadron on 30 December 1986. The 400th was the only USAF missile squadron to put the Peacekeeper on alert and in 1999 was awarded the General Samuel C. Phillips Award as the best missile squadron in Air Force Space Command. In 2001 in compliance with the Strategic Arms Reduction Treaty, these missiles were limited to a single reentry vehicle The Peacekeeper system continued in operation until 19 September 2005, when it was retired and the 400th Squadron inactivated at the start of the following month.

== Lineage ==
- Constituted as the 10th Reconnaissance Squadron (Heavy) on 28 January 1942

Activated on 15 April 1942
Redesignated 400th Bombardment Squadron (Heavy) on 22 April 1942
Redesignated 400th Bombardment Squadron, Heavy on 6 March 1944
Inactivated on 27 January 1946
Redesignated 400th Strategic Missile Squadron (ICBM-Minuteman) and activated on 10 December 1963 (not organized)
Organized on 1 July 1964
Redesignated 400th Missile Squadron on 1 September 1991
Inactivated 4 October 2005

=== Assignments ===
- 90th Bombardment Group, 15 April 1942 – 27 January 1946
- 90th Strategic Missile Wing (later 90th Missile Wing, 90th Space Wing), 1 July 1964 - 19 September 2005

=== Stations ===
- Key Field, Mississippi, 15 April 1942
- Barksdale Field, Louisiana, 17 May 1942
- Greenville Army Air Base, South Carolina, 21 June 1942
- Willow Run Airport, Michigan, 9–19 August 1942
- Hickam Field, Hawaii, 12 September 1942
- Iron Range Airfield, Queensland, Australia, c. 4 November 1942
- Jackson Airfield (7 Mile Drome), Port Moresby, New Guinea, c. 22 March 1943
- Dobodura Airfield Complex, New Guinea, December 1943
- Nadzab Airfield Complex, New Guinea, 23 February 1944
- Mokmer Airfield, Biak Island, Netherlands East Indies, c. 12 August 1944
- McGuire Field, Mindoro, Philippines, 26 January 1945
- Ie Shima Airfield, Okinawa, c. 11 August 1945
- Fort William McKinley, Luzon, Philippines, 23 November 1945 – 27 January 1946
- Francis E. Warren Air Force Base, Wyoming, 10 December 1963 – 19 September 2005

=== Aircraft and Missiles ===
- Consolidated B-24 Liberator, 1942–1945
- LGM-30B Minuteman I, 1964–1974
- LGM-30G Minuteman III, 1973–1986
- LGM-118A Peacekeeper, 1986–2005

=== Awards and campaigns ===
Award streamer	Award	Dates	Notes
	Distinguished Unit Citation	November 1942-23 January 1943	Papua, 400th Bombardment Squadron
	Distinguished Unit Citation	13 and 15 September 1943	New Guinea, 400th Bombardment Squadron
	Air Force Outstanding Unit Award	1 July 1968 – 30 June 1969	400th Strategic Missile Squadron
	Air Force Outstanding Unit Award	1 July 1973 – 30 June 1975	400th Strategic Missile Squadron
	Air Force Outstanding Unit Award	1 July 1982 – 30 June 1984	400th Strategic Missile Squadron
	Air Force Outstanding Unit Award	1 July 1986 – 30 June 1988	400th Strategic Missile Squadron
	Air Force Outstanding Unit Award	1 July 1988 – 30 June 1989	400th Strategic Missile Squadron
	Air Force Outstanding Unit Award	1 August 1991 – 31 July 1993	400th Strategic Missile Squadron (later 400th Missile Squadron)
	Air Force Outstanding Unit Award	1 October 1994 – 30 September 1995	400th Missile Squadron
	Air Force Outstanding Unit Award	1 January 2001 – 31 December 2001	400th Missile Squadron
	Air Force Outstanding Unit Award	1 October 2004 – 30 September 2005	400th Missile Squadron
	Philippine Republic Presidential Unit Citation	17 October 1944 – 4 July 1945	400th Bombardment Squadron

. Philippine Presidential Unit Citation (WWII).

Campaign Streamer	Campaign	Dates	Notes
	Guadalcanal	November 1942-21 February 1943	400th Bombardment Squadron
	Papua	November-23 January 1943	400th Bombardment Squadron
	Northern Solomons	23 February 1943 – 21 November 1944	400th Bombardment Squadron
	Bismarck Archipelago	15 December 1943 – 27 November 1944	400th Bombardment Squadron
	New Guinea	24 January 1943 – 31 December 1944	400th Bombardment Squadron
	Leyte	17 October 1944 – 1 July 1945	400th Bombardment Squadron
	Luzon	15 December 1944 – 4 July 1945	400th Bombardment Squadron
	Southern Philippines	27 February 1945 – 4 July 1945	400th Bombardment Squadron
	China Defensive	November 1942-4 May 1945	400th Bombardment Squadron
	China Offensive	5 May 1945 – 2 September 1945	400th Bombardment Squadron
	Air Offensive, Japan	November 1942-2 September 1945	400th Bombardment Squadron
	Western Pacific	17 April 1944 – 2 September 1945	400th Bombardment Squadron

== See also ==
- List of United States Air Force missile squadrons
- 400th Missile Squadron Launch Facilities
- B-24 Liberator units of the United States Army Air Forces
