= 90th Missile Wing LGM-30 Minuteman Missile Launch Sites =

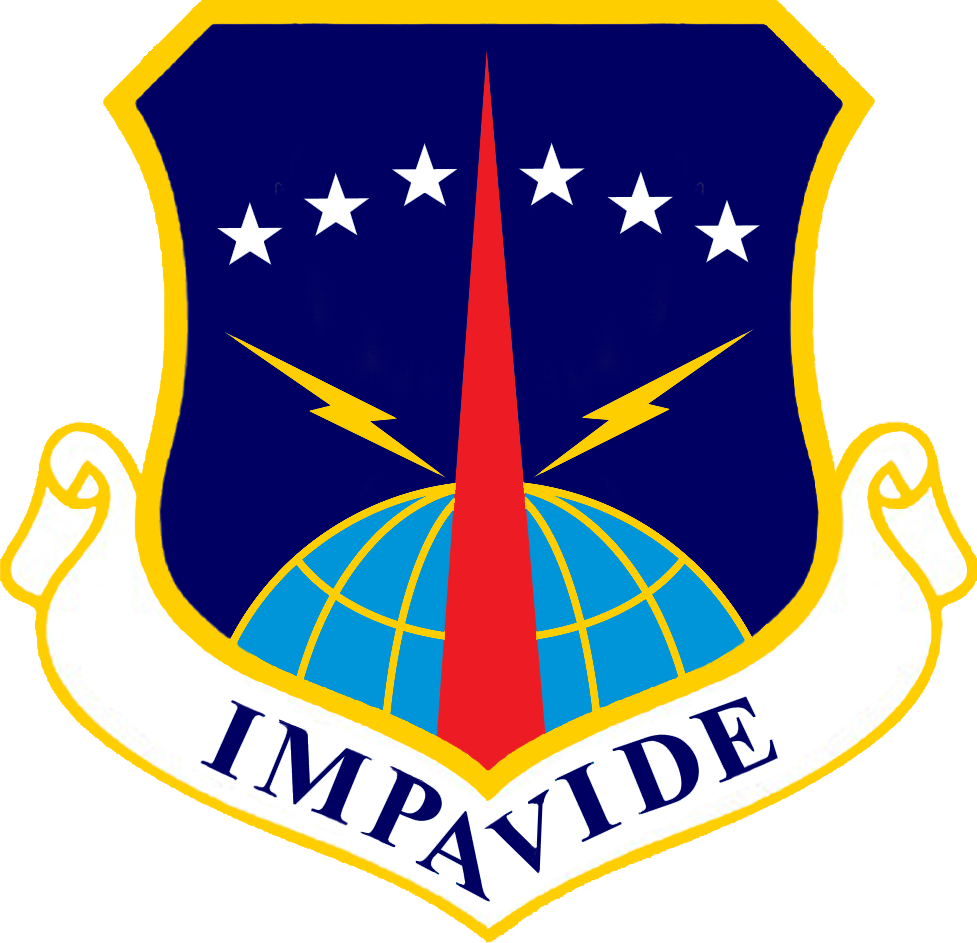
Emblem of the 90th Missile Wing

This is a list of the LGM-30 Minuteman missile alert and launch facilities of the 90th Missile Wing, 20th Air Force, assigned to Francis E. Warren Air Force Base, Wyoming.

== Overview ==
The 90th Strategic Missile Wing (SMW) was the fifth United States Air Force LGM-30 Minuteman ICBM wing to be created (the fourth with the LGM-30B Minuteman I). In October 1962, construction began over an 8,300-square-mile (21,000 km^{2}) area of Wyoming, Nebraska, and Colorado to build 200 Minuteman ICBM launch silos. On 1 July 1963, the Air Force activated the 90th SMW. The following year, the four component strategic missile squadrons activated 200 Minuteman missiles.

In November 1972, the Strategic Air Command (SAC) initiated the Minuteman Integrated Improvement Program to harden silos and upgrade command data buffers, allowing for quicker missile retargeting. Warren AFB also received new missiles: the Minuteman I ICBMs at the base were replaced with the LGM-30G Minuteman III between 1973 and 1975.

In November 1982, in a decision statement for Congress, President Ronald Reagan stated his plan to deploy the MX missile (later designated the LGM-118 Peacekeeper) to superhardened silos located at Warren AFB. In July 1984, construction began on Peacekeeper support facilities there. From 1986 through 1988, 50 Peacekeeper missiles were backfitted into silos formerly occupied by Minuteman IIIs of the 400th Strategic Missile Squadron. The 400th achieved initial operational capability with ten deployed Peacekeepers in December 1986; full operational capability was achieved in December 1988 with 50 missiles.

All of the 90th Wing's Minuteman III missile loads were reduced from three warheads to a single warhead by the START I treaty between 1991 and 2001. Beginning in 2002, the Peacekeepers began to be inactivated for budgetary reasons, and by September 2005, the 400th SMS had been inactivated.

The three active Minuteman III squadrons are commanded by the 90th Operations Group.

== Facilities ==
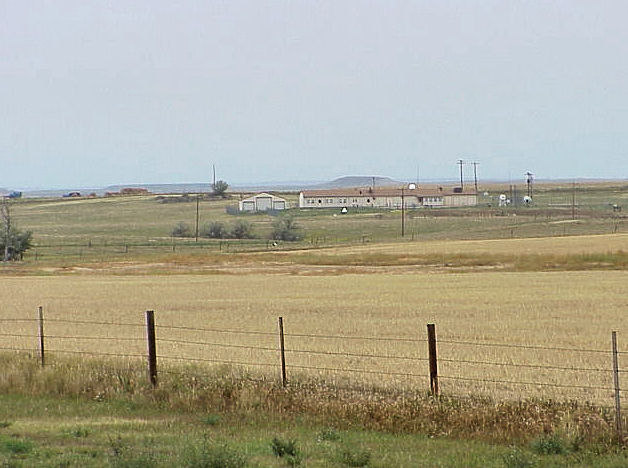
Missile Alert Facility

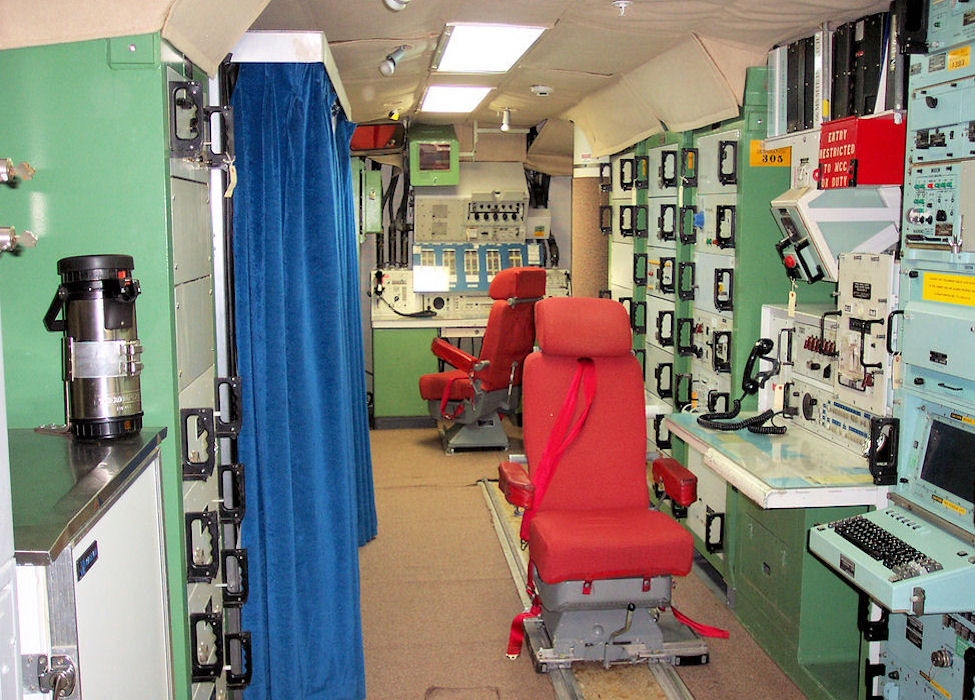
Launch Control Center

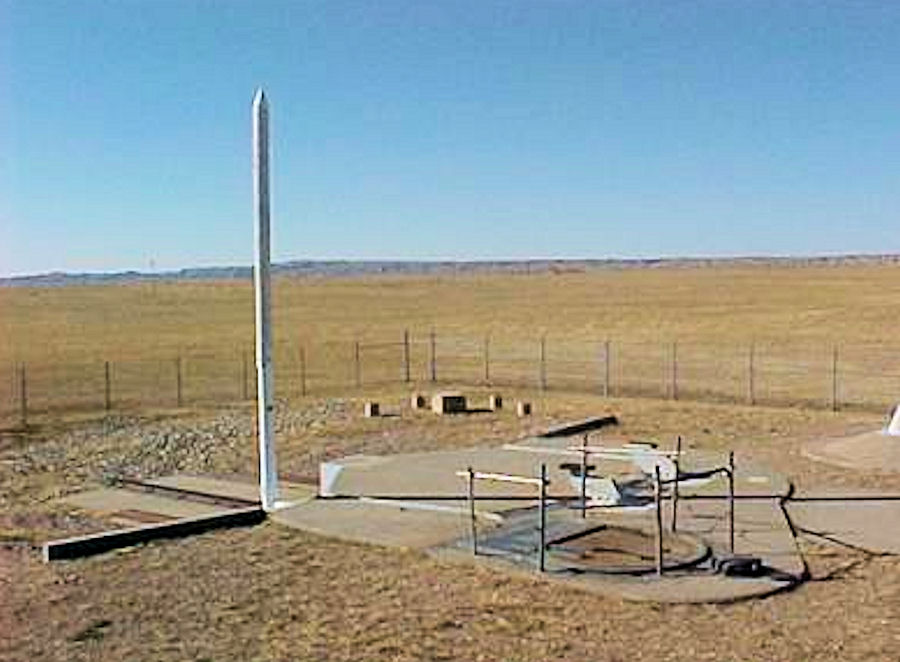
Minuteman III Launch Facility

The Missile Alert Facility (MAF) consists of a buried and hardened Launch Control Center (LCC) and an above-ground Launch Control Support Building (LCSB). MAFs were formerly known as Launch Control Facilities (LCFs) but the terminology changed in 1992 with the inactivation of the Strategic Air Command (SAC). In addition, a MAF has a helicopter landing pad, a large radio tower, a large "top hat" HF antenna; a garage for security vehicles; recreational facilities, and one or two sewage lagoons. The entire site, except for the helicopter pad and sewage lagoons, is secured with a fence and security personnel. About a dozen airmen and officers are assigned to a MAF.

The underground LCC contains the command and control equipment for missile operations. It is staffed by the two launch officers who have primary control and responsibility over the ten underground hardened Launch Facilities (LFs) within its flight; each contains an operational missile. Each of the five LCCs also has the ability to command and monitor all 50 LFs within the squadron. The LFs themselves are unmanned, except when maintenance and security personnel are needed there.

A squadron is composed of five flights, denoted by a letter of the alphabet; facilities controlled by the flight are designated by a number, 01 through 11, with 01 designating the MAF.

== Units and locations ==
=== 319th Missile Squadron ===
Activated by Strategic Air Command on 24 May. 1963. Organized on 1 October 1963.

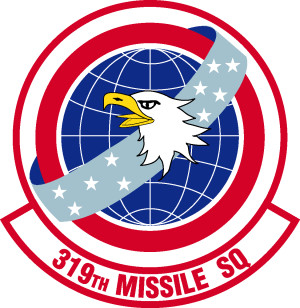
Emblem of the 319th Missile Squadron

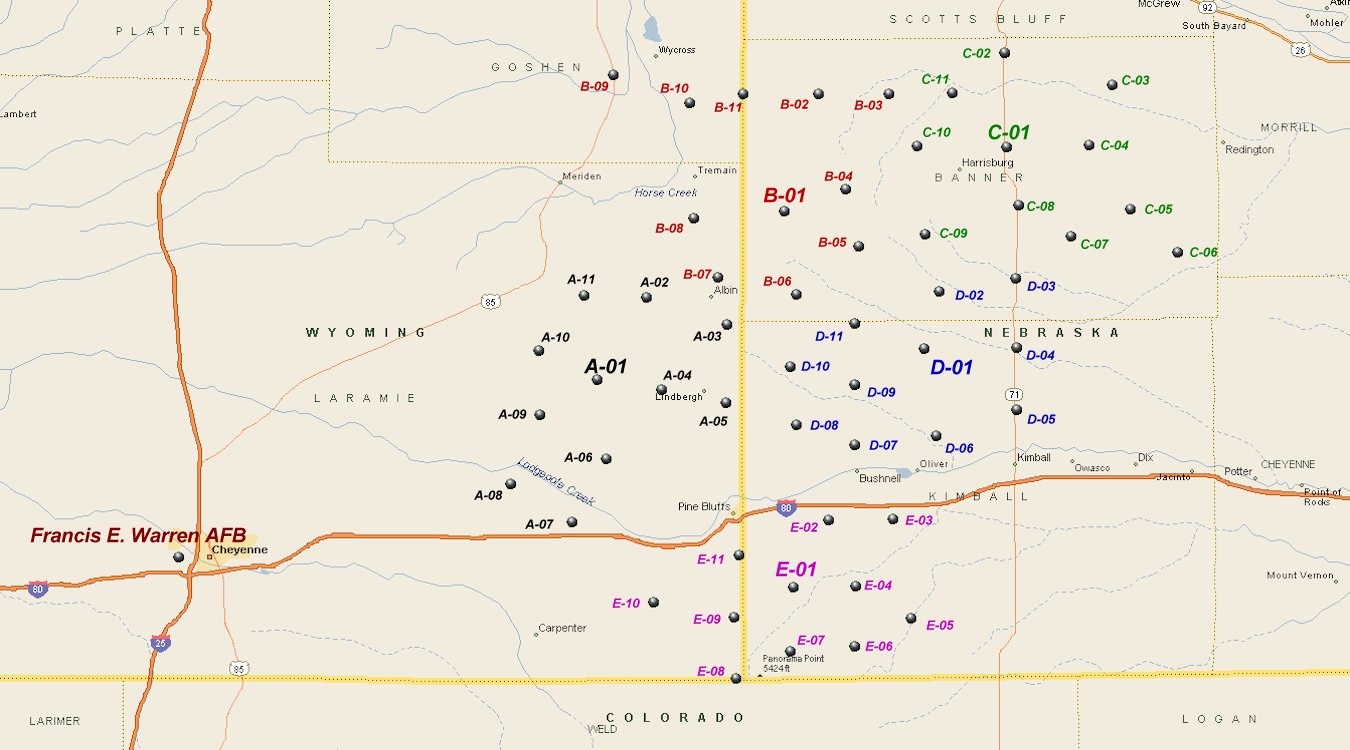
319th Missile Squadron – Missile Alert Facilities and Launch Facilities

- A-01 (MAF) 10.7 mi SW of Albin WY; 33.3 mi (53.6 km) ExNE of Warren AFB
  41°19′44″N 104°15′56″W

A-02 5.0 mi W of Albin WY, 41°25′03″N 104°11′41″W
A-03 2.3 mi SxSE of Albin WY, 41°23′17″N 104°04′42″W
A-04 8.0 mi SxSW of Albin WY, 41°19′04″N 104°10′29″W
A-05 8.0 mi S of Albin WY, 41°18′11″N 104°04′45″W
A-06 14.5 mi SxSW of Albin WY, 41°14′33″N 104°15′07″W
A-07 19.9 mi SxSW of Albin WY, 41°10′25″N 104°18′05″W
A-08 20.6 mi SW of Albin WY, 41°12′55″N 104°23′22″W
A-09 15.7 mi SW of Albin WY 41°17′24″N 104°20′52″W
A-10 13.7 mi WxSW of Albin WY 41°21′36″N 104°21′00″W
A-11 9.7 mi W of Albin WY, 41°25′10″N 104°17′04″W

- B-01 (MAF) 12.2 mi SE of LaGrange WY; 51.3 mi (82.6 km) ExNE of Warren AFB
  41°30′41″N 103°59′41″W

B-02 11.1 mi E of LaGrange WY, 41°38′20″N 103°56′43″W
B-03 16.4 mi E of LaGrange WY, 41°38′20″N 103°50′35″W
B-04 14.9 mi ExSE of LaGrange WY, 41°32′08″N 103°54′24″W
B-05 18.1 mi SE of LaGrange WY, 41°28′21″N 103°53′17″W
B-06 17.7 mi SxSE of LaGrange WY, 41°25′16″N 103°58′38″W
B-07 14.1 mi SxSE of LaGrange WY, 41°26′21″N 104°05′27″W
B-08 9.4 mi S of LaGrange WY, 41°30′12″N 104°07′34″W
B-09 9.4 mi S of LaGrange WY, 41°39′33″N 104°14′31″W
B-10 1.5 mi ExSE of LaGrange WY, 41°37′45″N 104°07′55″W
B-11 5.5 mi E of LaGrange WY, 41°38′19″N 104°03′16″W

- C-01 (MAF) 3.7 mi ExNE of Harrisburg NE; 68.3 mi (109.9 km) ExNE of Warren AFB
  41°34′50″N 103°40′25″W

C-02 9.3 mi NxNE of Harrisburg NE, 41°40′58″N 103°40′31″W
C-03 12.9 mi ExNE of Harrisburg NE, 41°38′47″N 103°31′13″W
C-04 9.7 mi E of Harrisburg NE, 41°34′56″N 103°33′12″W
C-05 13.0 mi ExSE of Harrisburg NE, 41°30′42″N 103°29′40″W
C-06 17.3 mi ExSE of Harrisburg NE, 41°27′54″N 103°25′38″W
C-07 9.6 mi ExSE of Harrisburg NE, 41°28′58″N 103°34′53″W
C-08 5.0 mi ExSE of Harrisburg NE, 41°30′59″N 103°39′23″W
C-09 5.6 mi SxSW of Harrisburg NE, 41°29′10″N 103°47′29″W
C-10 3.8 mi WxNW of Harrisburg NE, 41°34′52″N 103°48′11″W
C-11 5.8 mi N of Harrisburg NE, 41°38′21″N 103°45′05″W

- D-01 (MAF) 10.3 mi NxNE of Bushnell NE; 57.3 mi (92.2 km) ExNE of Warren AFB
  41°21′41″N 103°47′39″W

D-02 14.6 mi NxNE of Bushnell NE, 41°25′25″N 103°46′16″W
D-03 18.6 mi NE of Bushnell NE, 41°26′16″N 103°39′40″W
D-04 15.0 mi NE of Bushnell NE, 41°21′46″N 103°39′38″W
D-05 12.7 mi ExNE of Bushnell NE, 41°17′41″N 103°39′41″W
D-06 6.4 mi ExNE of Bushnell NE, 41°16′01″N 103°46′35″W
D-07 1.8 mi N of Bushnell NE, 41°15′28″N 103°53′38″W
D-08 5.6 mi NW of Bushnell NE, 41°16′44″N 103°58′40″W
D-09 6.3 mi N of Bushnell NE, 41°19′23″N 103°53′38″W
D-10 9.1 mi NxNW of Bushnell NE, 41°20′34″N 103°59′11″W
D-11 10.8 mi N of Bushnell NE, 41°23′19″N 103°53′38″W

- E-01 (MAF) 7.1 mi SE of Pine Bluffs WY; 45.8 mi (73.7 km) E of Warren AFB
  41°06′09″N 103°59′00″W

E-02 7.1 mi E of Pine Bluffs WY, 41°10′31″N 103°55′56″W
E-03 11.9 mi E of Pine Bluffs WY, 41°10′35″N 103°50′21″W
E-04 10.6 mi ExSE of Pine Bluffs WY, 41°06′14″N 103°53′38″W
E-05 15.3 mi ExSE of Pine Bluffs WY, 41°04′09″N 103°48′53″W
E-06 13.4 mi SE of Pine Bluffs WY, 41°02′18″N 103°53′43″W
E-07 11.1 mi SxSE of Pine Bluffs WY, 41°02′01″N 103°59′13″W
E-08 12.3 mi S of Pine Bluffs WY, 41°00′13″N 104°03′56″W
E-09 7.7 mi S of Pine Bluffs WY, 41°04′12″N 104°04′06″W
E-10 8.9 mi SW of Pine Bluffs WY, 41°05′11″N 104°11′02″W
E-11 3.1 mi S of Pine Bluffs WY, 41°08′15″N 104°03′40″W

=== 320th Missile Squadron ===
Activated by Strategic Air Command on 24 May 1963. Organized on 8 January 1964.

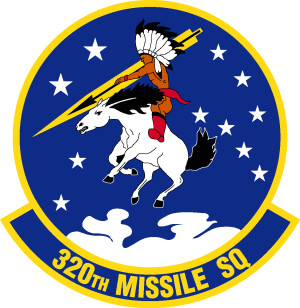
Emblem of the 320th Missile Squadron

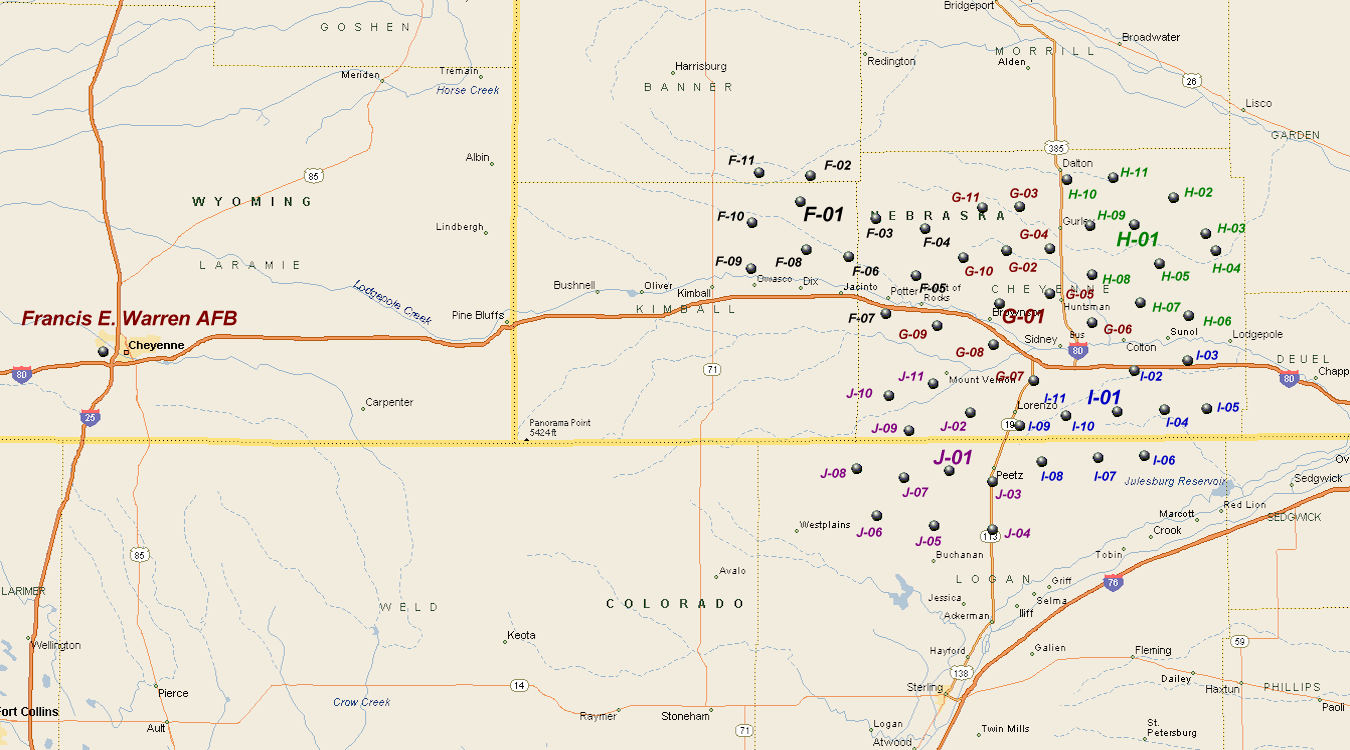
320th Missile Squadron – Missile Alert Facilities and Launch Facilities

- F-01 (MAF) 8.9 mi N of Dix NE; 72.8 mi (117.2 km) ExNE of Warren AFB
  41°21′49″N 103°29′20″W

F-02 12.7 mi NxNE of Dix NE, 41°24′07″N 103°23′09″W
F-03 10.4 mi NE of Dix NE, 41°20′15″N 103°20′23″W
F-04 14.0 mi ExNE of Dix NE, 41°19′19″N 103°14′34″W
F-05 11.7 mi E of Dix NE, 41°15′08″N 103°15′42″W
F-06 5.7 mi ExNE of Dix NE, 41°16′50″N 103°23′41″W
F-07 8.9 mi ExSE of Dix NE, 41°11′42″N 103°19′20″W
F-08 3.9 mi N of Dix NE, 41°17′29″N 103°28′45″W
F-09 5.6 mi WxNW of Dix NE, 41°15′48″N 103°35′13″W
F-10 8.4 mi NW of Dix NE, 41°19′53″N 103°35′05″W
F-11 12.7 mi NxNW of Dix NE, 41°24′25″N 103°34′20″W

- G-01 (MAF) 7.7 mi NW of Sidney NE; 91.9 mi (147.9 km) E of Warren AFB
  41°12′31″N 103°05′48″W

G-02 11.5 mi NxNW of Sidney NE, 41°17′17″N 103°04′59″W
G-03 14.9 mi NxNW of Sidney NE, 41°21′12″N 103°02′21″W
G-04 10.3 mi N of Sidney NE, 41°17′29″N 102°59′49″W
G-05 5.7 mi N of Sidney NE, 41°13′26″N 102°59′39″W
G-06 4.1 mi NE of Sidney NE, 41°10′45″N 102°54′52″W
G-07 4.4 mi SW of Sidney NE, 41°05′37″N 103°01′51″W
G-08 6.9 mi W of Sidney NE, 41°08′51″N 103°06′33″W
G-09 12.9 mi W of Sidney NE, 41°10′38″N 103°13′15″W
G-10 13.7 mi NW of Sidney NE, 41°16′41″N 103°10′06″W
G-11 16.5 mi NxNW of Sidney NE, 41°21′10″N 103°07′43″W

- H-01 (MAF) 7.3 mi E of Gurley NE; 106.3 mi (171.1 km) E of Warren AFB
  41°19′30″N 102°49′46″W

H-02 11.7 mi ExNE of Gurley NE, 41°21′56″N 102°45′05″W
H-03 14.7 mi E of Gurley NE, 41°18′38″N 102°41′16″W
H-04 16.8 mi ExSE of Gurley NE, 41°14′07″N 102°40′07″W
H-05 10.6 mi ExSE of Gurley NE, 41°15′58″N 102°46′51″W
H-06 15.9 mi SE of Gurley NE, 41°11′10″N 102°43′24″W
H-07 11.1 mi of Gurley NE, 41°12′29″N 102°49′08″W
H-08 5.8 mi SxSE of Gurley NE, 41°15′02″N 102°54′49″W
H-09 2.8 mi E of Gurley NE, 41°19′26″N 102°55′00″W
H-10 5.0 mi N of Gurley NE, 41°23′39″N 102°57′41″W
H-11 7.3 mi NE of Gurley NE, 41°23′47″N 102°52′10″W

- I-01 (MAF) 9.3 mi SW of Sunol NE; 104.2 mi (167.7 km) E of Warren AFB
  41°02′44″N 102°51′57″W

I-02 4.9 mi SW of Sunol NE, 41°06′24″N 102°49′54″W
I-03 3.0 mi SE of Sunol NE, 41°07′18″N 102°43′34″W
I-04 7.4 mi S of Sunol NE, 41°02′56″N 102°46′26″W
I-05 8.3 mi SxSE of Sunol NE, 41°02′56″N 102°41′20″W
I-06 12.4 mi SxSW of Sunol NE, 40°58′47″N 102°48′47″W
I-07 14.2 mi SxSW of Sunol NE, 40°58′51″N 102°54′21″W
I-08 17.8 mi SW of Sunol NE, 40°58′17″N 103°00′06″W
I-09 17.8 mi WxSW of Sunol NE, 41°01′37″N 103°03′30″W
I-10 13.3 mi SW of Sunol NE, 41°02′26″N 102°58′00″W
I-11 8.9 mi WxSW of Sunol NE, 41°06′03″N 102°55′03″W

- J-01 (MAF) 4.6 mi W of Peetz CO; 87.7 mi (141.1 km) E of Warren AFB
  40°57′38″N 103°11′56″W

J-02 6.2 mi NxNW of Peetz CO, 41°02′48″N 103°09′18″W
J-03 1.4 mi S NxNW of Peetz CO, 40°56′35″N 103°06′50″W
J-04 6.3 mi S of Peetz CO, 40°52′17″N 103°06′49″W
J-05 8.4 mi SW of Peetz CO, 40°52′40″N 103°13′40″W
J-06 13.0 mi WxSW of Peetz CO, 40°53′33″N 103°20′32″W
J-07 9.1 mi W of Peetz CO, 40°57′00″N 103°17′03″W
J-08 14.1 mi W of Peetz CO, 40°57′48″N 103°22′52″W
J-09 9.5 mi WxNW of Peetz CO, 41°01′14″N 103°16′36″W
J-10 13.4 mi NW of Peetz CO, 41°04′43″N 103°19′00″W
J-11 10.7 mi NW of Peetz CO, 41°05′25″N 103°13′42″W

=== 321st Missile Squadron ===
Activated by Strategic Air Command on 24 May 1963. Organized on 9 April 1964.

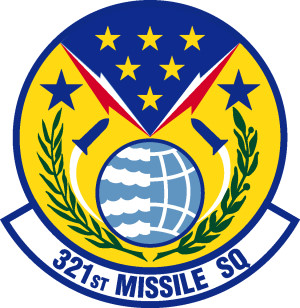
Emblem of the 321st Missile Squadron

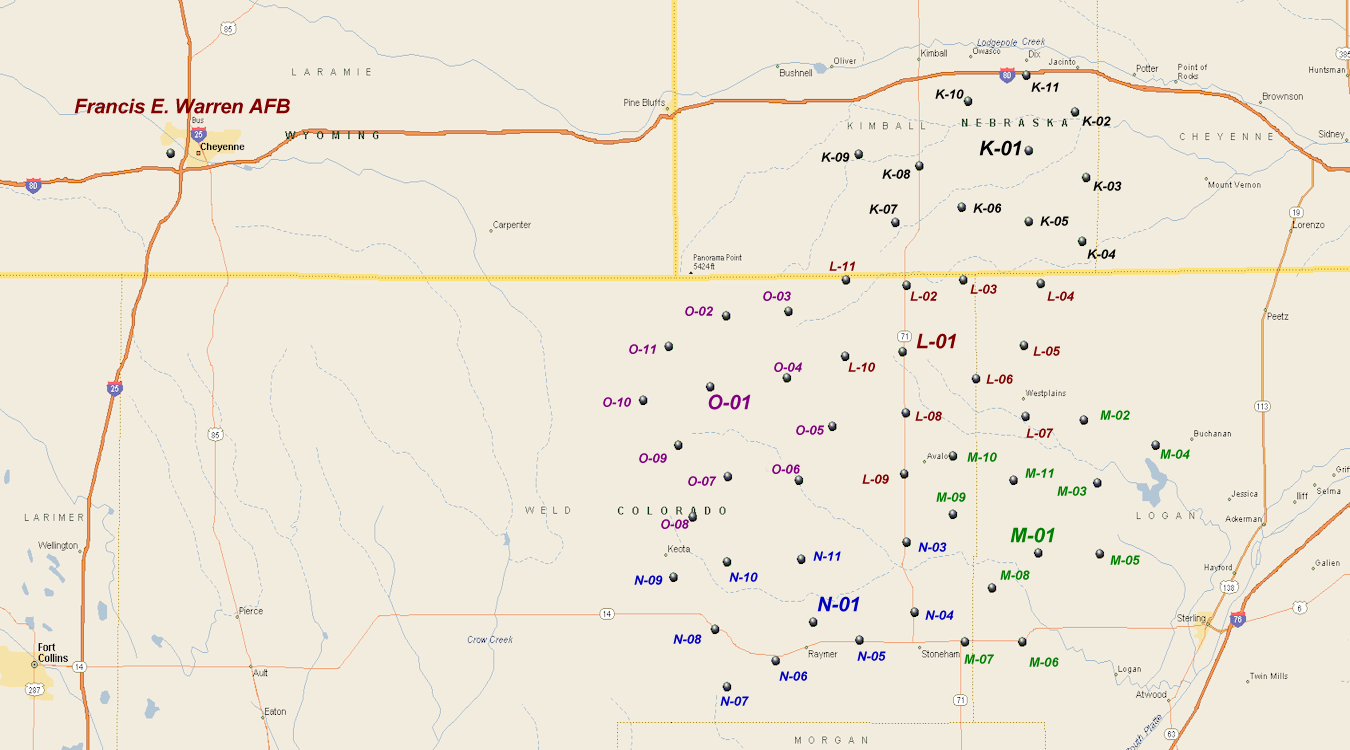
321st Missile Squadron – Missile Alert Facilities and Launch Facilities

- K-01 (MAF) 10.6 mi WxSW of Potter NE; 71.5 mi (115.1 km) E of Warren AFB
  41°08′13″N 103°29′18″W

K-02 5.8 mi WxSW of Potter NE, 41°10′40″N 103°24′47″W
K-03 8.7 mi SxSW of Potter NE, 41°06′28″N 103°23′47″W
K-04 13.1 mi SxSW of Potter NE, 41°02′22″N 103°24′10″W
K-05 14.1 mi SW of Potter NE, 41°03′40″N 103°29′18″W
K-06 17.5 mi WxSW of Potter NE, 41°04′38″N 103°35′45″W
K-07 22.9 mi WxSW of Potter NE, 41°03′40″N 103°42′09″W
K-08 19.4 mi WxSW of Potter NE, 41°07′16″N 103°39′52″W
K-09 23.9 mi WxSW of Potter NE, 41°08′05″N 103°45′39″W
K-10 14.2 mi W of Potter NE, 41°11′27″N 103°35′07″W
K-11 9.2 mi W of Potter NE, 41°13′06″N 103°29′30″W

- L-01 (MAF) 21.9 mi N of Stoneham CO; 63.1 mi (101.5 km) ExSE of Warren AFB
  40°55′17″N 103°41′30″W

L-02 26.8 mi N of Stoneham CO, 40°59′34″N 103°41′08″W
L-03 27.5 mi N of Stoneham CO, 40°59′56″N 103°35′38″W
L-04 28.7 mi NxNE of Stoneham CO, 40°59′39″N 103°28′14″W
L-05 24.0 mi NxNE of Stoneham CO, 40°55′40″N 103°29′52″W
L-06 20.4 mi NxNE of Stoneham CO, 40°53′32″N 103°34′29″W
L-07 19.2 mi NxNE of Stoneham CO, 40°51′05″N 103°29′45″W
L-08 17.3 mi N of Stoneham CO, 40°51′20″N 103°41′14″W
L-09 12.9 mi N of Stoneham CO, 40°47′26″N 103°41′22″W
L-10 22.4 mi NxNW of Stoneham CO, 40°55′00″N 103°47′01″W
L-11 27.9 mi NxNW of Stoneham CO, 40°59′57″N 103°46′54″W

- M-01 (MAF) 15.1 mi WxNW of Sterling CO; 78.7 mi (126.7 km) ExSE of Warren AFB
  40°42′15″N 103°28′35″W

M-02 18.4 mi NW of Sterling CO, 40°50′48″N 103°24′09″W
M-03 14.0 mi NW of Sterling CO, 40°46′45″N 103°22′52″W
M-04 14.1 mi NxNW of Sterling CO, 40°49′10″N 103°17′15″W
M-05 10.4 mi WxNW of Sterling CO, 40°42′11″N 103°22′40″W
M-06 15.6 mi W of Sterling CO, 40°36′33″N 103°30′11″W
M-07 20.4 mi W of Sterling CO, 40°36′34″N 103°35′39″W
M-08 18.3 mi W of Sterling CO, 40°40′03″N 103°33′02″W
M-09 22.9 mi WxNW of Sterling CO, 40°44′47″N 103°36′46″W
M-10 24.8 mi WxNW of Sterling CO, 40°48′34″N 103°36′44″W
M-11 19.5 mi NW of Sterling CO, 40°46′59″N 103°30′56″W

- N-01 (MAF) 1.7 mi N of Raymer CO; 64.6 mi (104.0 km) ExSE of Warren AFB
  40°37′54″N 103°50′11″W

N-02 8.5 mi NxNE of Raymer CO, 40°43′0″N 103°46′14″W
N-03 11.2 mi NE of Raymer CO, 40°43′00″N 103°41′12″W
N-04 9.2 mi ExNE of Raymer CO, 40°38′30″N 103°40′29″W
N-05 4.3 mi E of Raymer CO, 40°36′43″N 103°45′44″W
N-06 3.0 mi WxSW of Raymer CO, 40°35′24″N 103°53′47″W
N-07 7.5 mi WxSW of Raymer CO, 40°33′42″N 103°58′23″W
N-08 8.0 mi W of Raymer CO, 40°37′26″N 103°59′35″W
N-09 12.4 mi WxNW of Raymer CO, 40°40′48″N 104°03′31″W
N-10 9.2 mi NW of Raymer CO, 40°41′46″N 103°58′23″W
N-11 6.4 mi N of Raymer CO, 40°41′57″N 103°51′16″W

- O-01 (MAF) 11.8 mi E of Grover CO; 48.6 mi (78.2 km) ExSE of Warren AFB
  40°53′05″N 104°00′01″W

O-02 14.5 mi ExNE of Grover CO, 40°57′40″N 103°58′28″W
O-03 19.4 mi ExNE of Grover CO, 40°57′54″N 103°52′28″W
O-04 18.5 mi E of Grover CO, 40°53′38″N 103°52′38″W
O-05 22.0 mi E of Grover CO, 40°50′30″N 103°48′18″W
O-06 20.1 mi ExSE of Grover CO, 40°47′03″N 103°51′32″W
O-07 14.4 mi ExSE of Grover CO, 40°47′17″N 103°58′19″W
O-08 13.6 mi SE of Grover CO, 40°44′39″N 104°01′39″W
O-09 9.7 mi ExSE of Grover CO, 40°49′19″N 104°03′02″W
O-10 6.1 mi E of Grover CO, 40°52′11″N 104°06′26″W
O-11 9.2 mi ExNE of Grover CO, 40°55′42″N 104°03′59″W

=== 400th Missile Squadron ===
Activated by Strategic Air Command on 10 December 1963. Organized on 1 July 1964. Initially equipped with LGM-30B Minuteman I missiles. With the deployment of the LGM-118A Peacekeeper in 1987, the squadron's 50 Minuteman silos (Flights P through T) were converted to the Peacekeeper for operational duty. The Peacekeepers were retired between October 2002 and September 2005, and the squadron was formally inactivated on 19 September 2005.

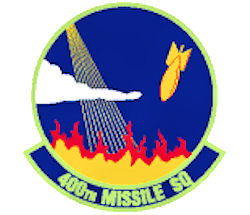
Emblem of the 400th Missile Squadron

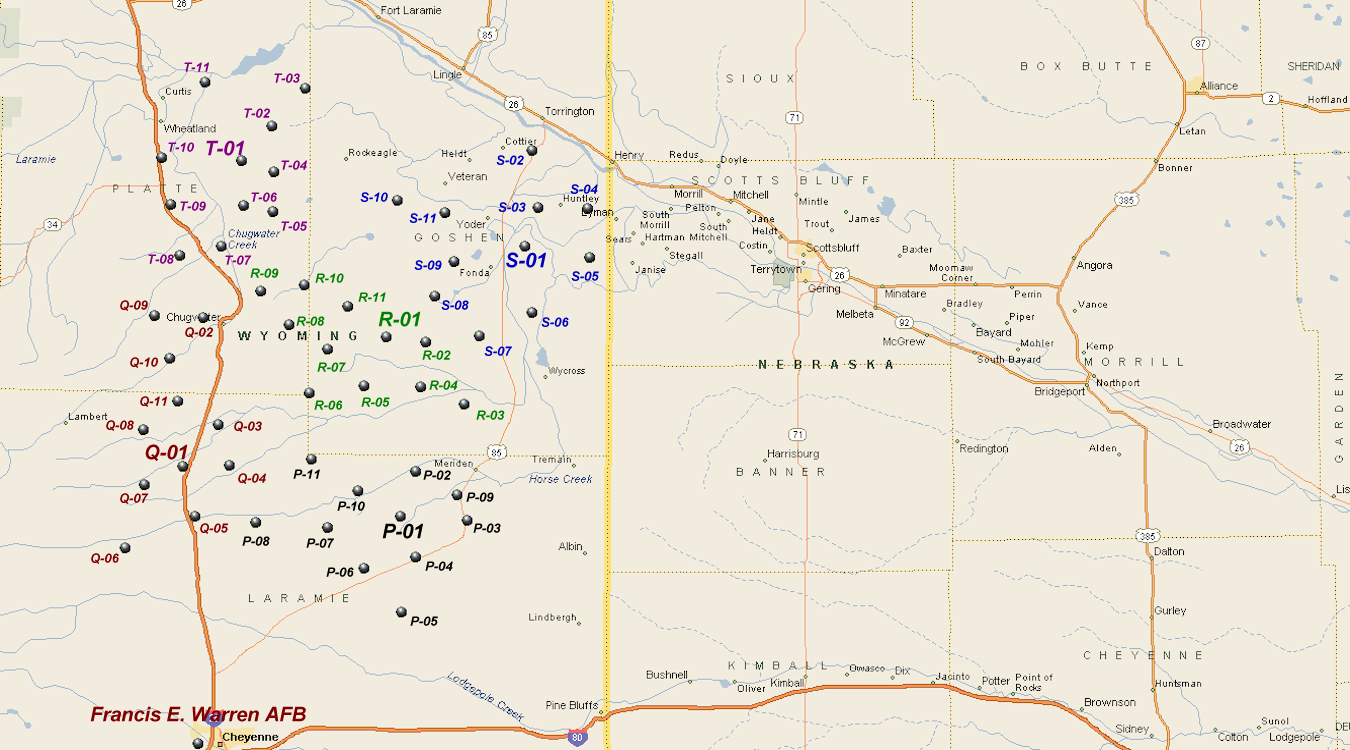
400th Missile Squadron – Missile Alert Facilities and Launch Facilities

- P-01 (MAF) 18.0 mi N of Hillsdale WY; 30.1 mi (48.4 km) NE of Warren AFB
  41°28′20″N 104°28′04″W

P-02 22.6 mi N of Hillsdale WY, 41°32′20″N 104°26′22″W
P-03 19.1 mi NxNE of Hillsdale WY, 41°28′04″N 104°20′11″W
P-04 13.9 mi N of Hillsdale WY, 41°24′44″N 104°26′14″W
P-05 8.2 mi N of Hillsdale WY, 41°19′49″N 104°27′55″W
P-06 13.0 mi NxNW of Hillsdale WY, 41°23′43″N 104°32′21″W
P-07 18.3 mi NxNW of Hillsdale WY, 41°27′22″N 104°36′46″W
P-08 22.5 mi NW of Hillsdale WY 41°27′44″N 104°45′21″W
P-09 21.2 mi NxNE of Hillsdale WY, 41°30′17″N 104°41′24″W
P-10 20.9 mi N of Hillsdale WY, 41°30′34″N 104°33′11″W
P-11 25.4 mi NxNW of Hillsdale WY, 41°33′25″N 104°38′45″W

- Q-01 (MAF) 15.4 mi SxSW of Chugwater WY; 27.1 mi (43.6 km) N of Warren AFB
  41°32′35″N 104°54′10″W

Q-02 2.4 mi WxNW of Chugwater WY, 41°45′53″N 104°51′58″W
Q-03 10.4 mi S of Chugwater WY, 41°36′22″N 104°49′59″W
Q-04 14.6 mi S of Chugwater WY, 41°32′45″N 104°48′32″W
Q-05 20.1 mi S of Chugwater WY, 41°28′10″N 104°52′37″W
Q-06 25.3 mi SxSW of Chugwater WY, 41°25′17″N 105°00′56″W
Q-07 18.6 mi SxSW of Chugwater WY, 41°30′58″N 104°58′46″W
Q-08 13.8 mi SxSW of Chugwater WY, 41°35′50″N 104°58′55″W
Q-09 7.3 mi W of Chugwater WY, 41°46′01″N 104°57′46″W
Q-10 6.8 mi WxSW of Chugwater WY, 41°42′11″N 104°55′51″W
Q-11 9.4 mi SxSW of Chugwater WY, 41°38′24″N 104°54′54″W

- R-01 (MAF) 16.4 mi NW of Meriden WY; 44.6 mi (71.8 km) NxNE of Warren AFB
  41°44′17″N 104°30′00″W

R-02 13.9 mi NxNW of Meriden WY, 41°43′49″N 104°25′11″W
R-03 6.8 mi N of Meriden WY, 41°38′22″N 104°20′32″W
R-04 10.2 mi NW of Meriden WY, 41°39′55″N 104°25′47″W
R-05 14.4 mi NW of Meriden WY, 41°39′56″N 104°32′36″W
R-06 18.9 mi WxNW of Meriden WY, 41°39′14″N 104°39′08″W
R-07 19.6 mi NW of Meriden WY 41°43′11″N 104°36′55″W
R-08 24.2 mi NW of Meriden WY 41°45′16″N 104°41′35″W
R-09 28.7 mi NW of Meriden WY 41°48′14″N 104°45′04″W
R-10 25.8 mi NW of Meriden WY 41°48′50″N 104°39′46″W
R-11 21.3 mi NW of Meriden WY 41°46′59″N 104°34′37″W

- S-01 (MAF) 4.8 mi SE of Yoder WY; 59.8 mi (96.2 km) NxNE of Warren AFB
  41°52′23″N 104°13′20″W

S-02 8.1 mi NxNE of Yoder WY, 42°00′54″N 104°12′35″W
S-03 5.2 mi E of Yoder WY, 41°55′52″N 104°11′49″W
S-04 10.4 mi E of Yoder WY, 41°55′48″N 104°05′40″W
S-05 11.2 mi ExSE of Yoder WY, 41°51′26″N 104°05′32″W
S-06 10.7 mi SxSE of Yoder WY, 41°46′32″N 104°12′32″W
S-07 12.2 mi S of Yoder WY, 41°44′28″N 104°18′49″W
S-08 9.9 mi SW of Yoder WY, 41°47′56″N 104°24′12″W
S-09 5.8 mi SW of Yoder WY, 41°51′04″N 104°21′52″W
S-10 9.5 mi W of Yoder WY, 41°56′27″N 104°28′40″W
S-11 4.5 mi W of Yoder WY, 41°55′21″N 104°22′59″W

- T-01 (MAF) 9.1 mi ExSE of Wheatland WY; 58.5 mi (94.1 km) N of Warren AFB
  41°59′51″N 104°47′30″W

T-02 11.3 mi E of Wheatland WY, 42°02′56″N 104°43′55″W
T-03 15.2 mi ExNE of Wheatland WY, 42°06′18″N 104°39′53″W
T-04 12.6 mi ExSE of Wheatland WY, 41°58′51″N 104°43′36″W
T-05 17.0 mi SE of Wheatland WY, 41°52′22″N 104°43′42″W
T-06 12.1 mi SE of Wheatland WY, 41°55′49″N 104°47′14″W
T-07 14.2 mi SxSE of Wheatland WY, 41°52′14″N 104°49′51″W
T-08 13.9 mi S of Wheatland WY, 41°51′20″N 104°54′50″W
T-09 8.5 mi S of Wheatland WY, 41°55′55″N 104°55′59″W
T-10 3.7 mi S of Wheatland WY, 42°00′03″N 104°57′06″W
T-11 5.9 mi NE of Wheatland WY, 42°06′44″N 104°52′03″W
