= 90th Missile Wing =

US Air Force unit

90th Missile Wing

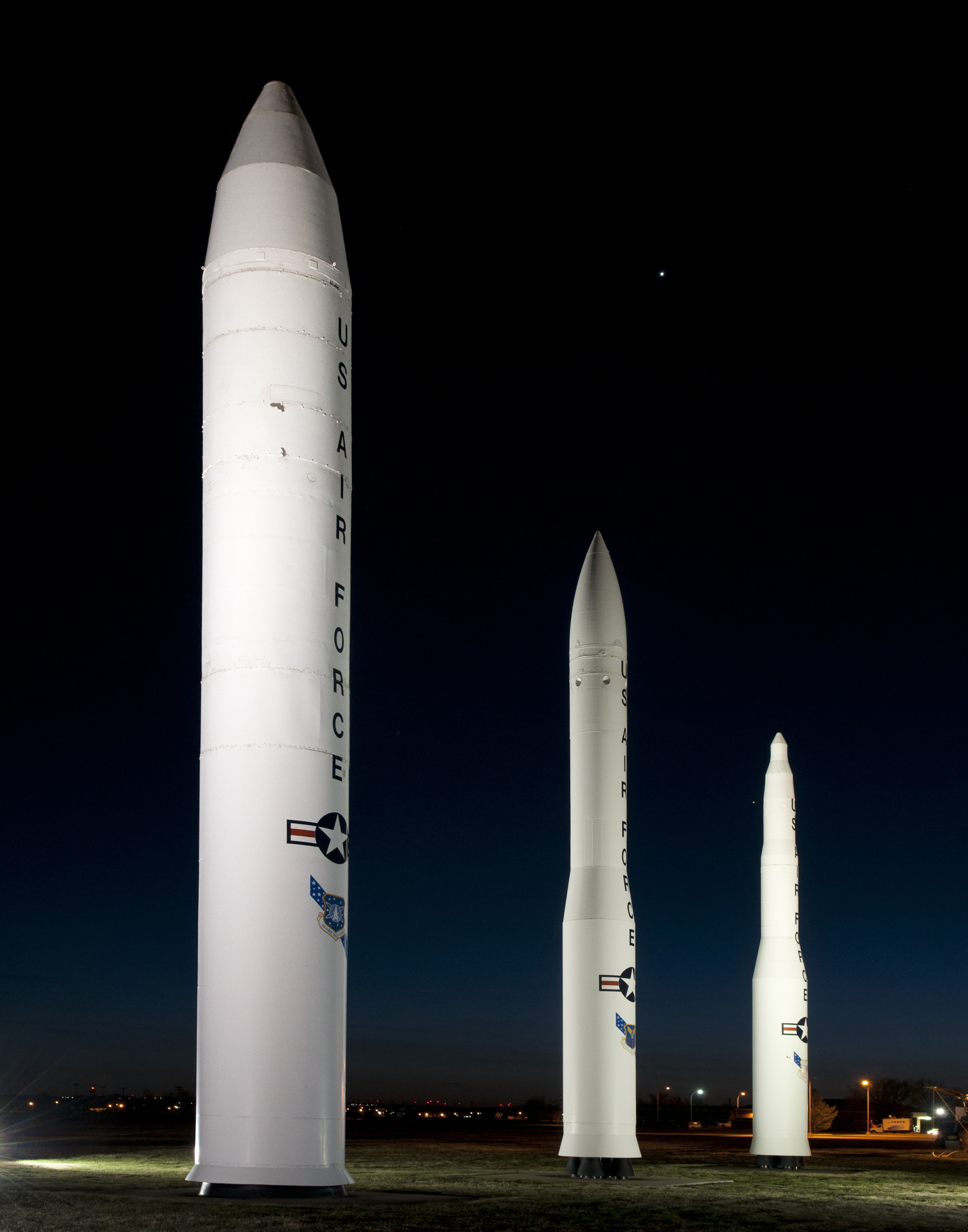
- Display of missiles operated by the wing
- Active: 1951–60; 1963–present
- Country: United States
- Branch: United States Air Force
- Role: Strategic missile
- Size: 3361 military and 964 civilians as of May 2016
- Part of: Air Force Global Strike Command
- Garrison/HQ: Francis E. Warren Air Force Base
- Nickname: Mighty Ninety
- Mottos: "Impavide" (Latin) ”Undauntedly”
- Decorations: Air Force Outstanding Unit Award (Note: In addition, the wing is entitled to display the awards and campaigns of the 90th Bombardment Group by temporary bestowal. Robertson, AFHRA Factsheet, 90th Missile Wing)

Commanders
- Current commander: Col. Terrance J. Holmes
- Vice commander: Col. Richard K. Harrop
- Command Chief: CCM Cherise L. Mosley

Insignia
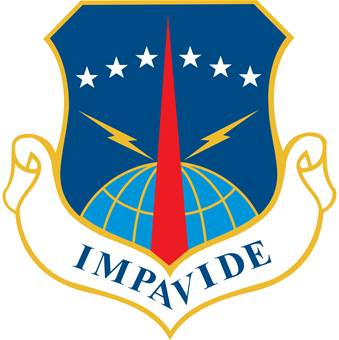
- 90th Missile Wing emblem (Approved 9 December 1993)

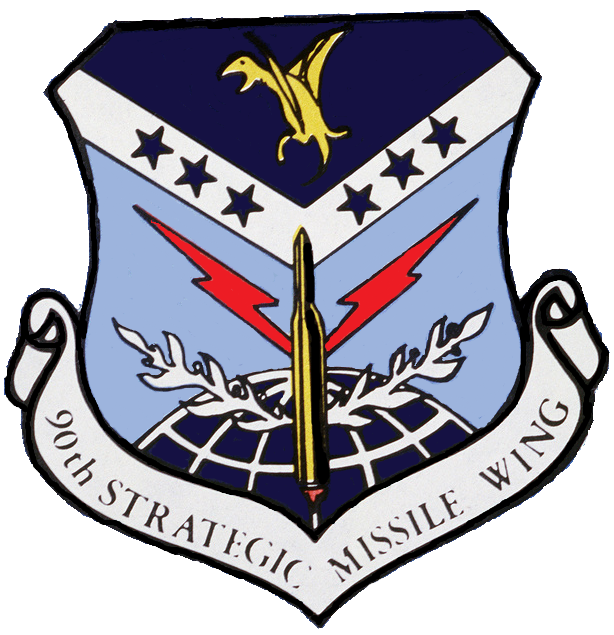
- 90th Strategic Missile Wing emblem (Approved 29 September 1964

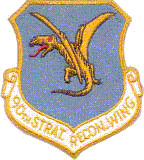
- Patch with 90th Strategic Reconnaissance Wing emblem

The 90th Missile Wing is a component of Twentieth Air Force, stationed at Francis E. Warren Air Force Base and equipped with LGM-30G Minuteman III Missiles. It has served at Warren as a component of Strategic Air Command, Air Combat Command, Air Force Space Command and Air Force Global Strike Command since 1963.

The wing was first organized at Fairchild Air Force Base, Washington as the 90th Bombardment Wing, a Boeing B-29 Superfortress unit. After moving to Forbes Air Force Base, Kansas, it served as a training unit for Strategic Air Command units and aircrews in the B-29. In 1953 it converted to the strategic reconnaissance mission, upgrading to the Boeing RB-47 Stratojet in 1954. After 1958 it trained reconnaissance crews with the B-47 and continued that mission until it was inactivated in 1960.

The wing operates 150 LGM-30G Minuteman III intercontinental ballistic missiles on full alert 24 hours a day, 365 days a year. Its missiles are dispersed in hardened silos to protect against attack and connected to underground missile alert facilities through a system of hardened cables.

== Structure ==
The 90th Missile Wing is made up of a wing staff and five groups:

The 90th Operations Group is composed of three missile squadrons, an operations support squadron and a standardization and evaluation element. Each missile squadron is responsible for five missile alert facilities and 50 Minuteman III ICBMs. Its units include the 319th, 320th and 321st Missile Squadrons and the 90th Operations Support Squadron.

The 90th Maintenance Group maintains 150 missiles and associated launch facilities, as well as 15 launch control facilities spread between a three-state, 9,600 square-mile complex. It is composed of the 90th Missile Maintenance Squadron and the 90th Maintenance Operations Squadron and a Maintenance Quality Assurance Section.

The 90th Mission Support Group provides civil engineering, transportation and logistics, communications, contracting, and personnel and services support to the wing and tenant units. The units of the 90th Mission Support Group include the 90th Civil Engineer Squadron, 90th Logistics Readiness Squadron, 90th Communications Squadron, 90th Contracting Squadron, and the 90th Force Support Squadron.

The 90th Security Forces Group is composed of five squadrons. The 790th Missile Security Forces Squadron provides security for convoys and missile maintenance operations. The 90th Ground Combat Training Squadron is located at Camp Guernsey in Guernsey, Wyoming, and provides security, pre-deployment, and antiterrorism/force protection training for USAF personnel. The 90th Missile Security Forces Squadron provides security for 15 missile alert facilities and 150 launch facilities. The 90th Security Forces Squadron provides installation and weapons storage area security; police services; pass and registration functions; and reports and analysis duties. The 90th Security Support Squadron provides command and control for the missile field and access control for all missile field forces as well as all security forces training and equipment support.

The 90th Medical Group is responsible for medical and dental care for more than 17,000 beneficiaries throughout Wyoming, Nebraska and northern Colorado. The group's mission is to maximize personnel health, fitness and readiness through emphasizing health promotion and preventive medicine. The units of the 90th Medical Group include the 90th Operational Medical Readiness Squadron and the 90th Healthcare Operations Squadron.

== History ==
=== Superfortress operations ===
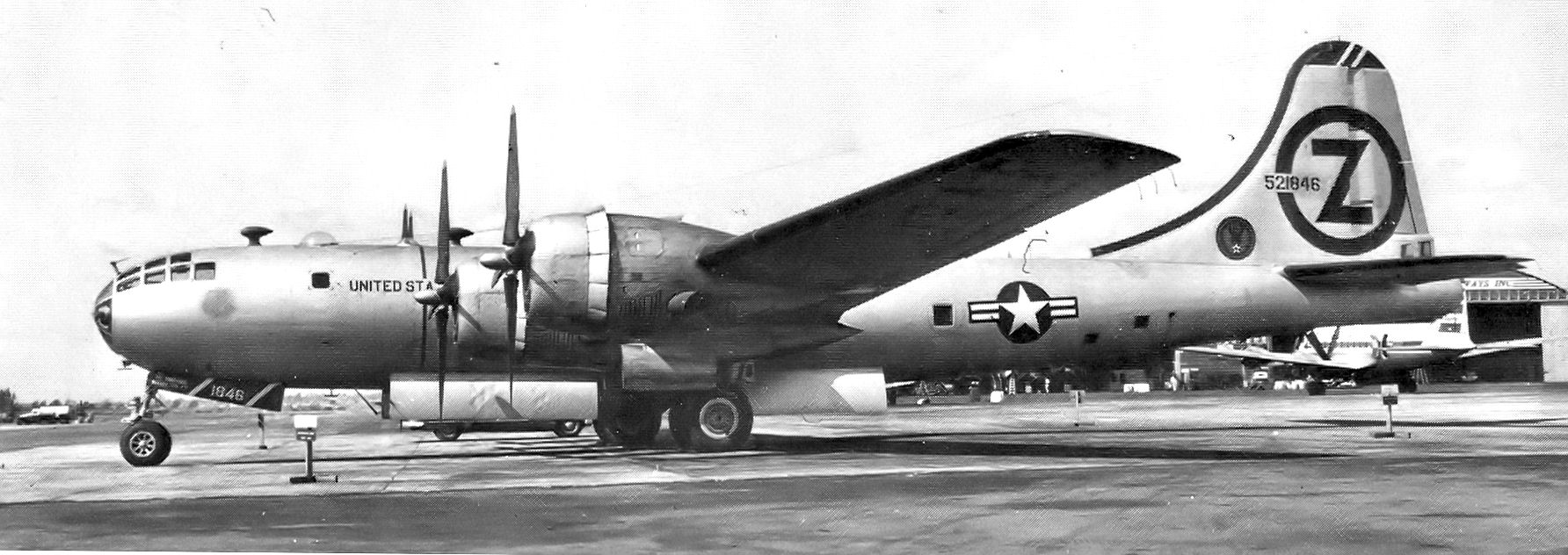
Wing Boeing B-29 (Note: Aircraft is Boeing B-29-100-BW Superfortress serial 45-21846)

The wing was first organized at Fairchild Air Force Base, Washington in January 1951 as the 90th Bombardment Wing and equipped with the Boeing B-29 Superfortress. While organizing, it was attached to the 92d Bombardment Wing, whose commander also served as the commander of the 90th Wing. In February, as part of a reorganization of Strategic Air Command wings, the 90th Wing's 90th Bombardment Group was reduced to paper status and its squadrons were attached to the wing for operational control. In June 1952, this organization, which was designed to permit the wing commander to focus on the wing's combat units and the maintenance necessary to support combat aircraft, was formalized as the Dual Deputy Organization and the group was inactivated and its squadrons were assigned to the wing.

In March 1951, the wing moved to Forbes Air Force Base, where it served primarily as a training unit. In May, it began serving as an Operational Training Unit for B-29 aircrews and mechanics of newly-activating units. The 376th Bombardment Wing was the first new Superfortress wing trained by the 90th, activating on 1 June 1951. In October, it was combat ready and moved to Barksdale Air Force Base, Louisiana, its permanent base. The day the 376th Wing departed, the 308th Bombardment Wing was activated and began its training, which lasted until it moved to Hunter Air Force Base, Georgia in April 1952. The 310th Bombardment Wing was the last B-29 unit trained at Forbes. With its departure for Schilling Air Force Base, Kansas in September 1952, the B-29 operational training mission ended.

In June, the wing added duty as a Replacement Training Unit, primarily providing individual training for aircrew being assigned to existing Far East Air Forces B-29 units during the Korean War. (Note: Replacement Training Units trained individuals to fill positions in existing units. See Goss, p. xxxvi) In November 1952 it also began training replacement crews for the RB-29 reconnaissance model of the Superfortress and SHORAN personnel for Strategic Air Command (SAC). These training activities continued through November 1953.

=== Strategic reconnaissance ===
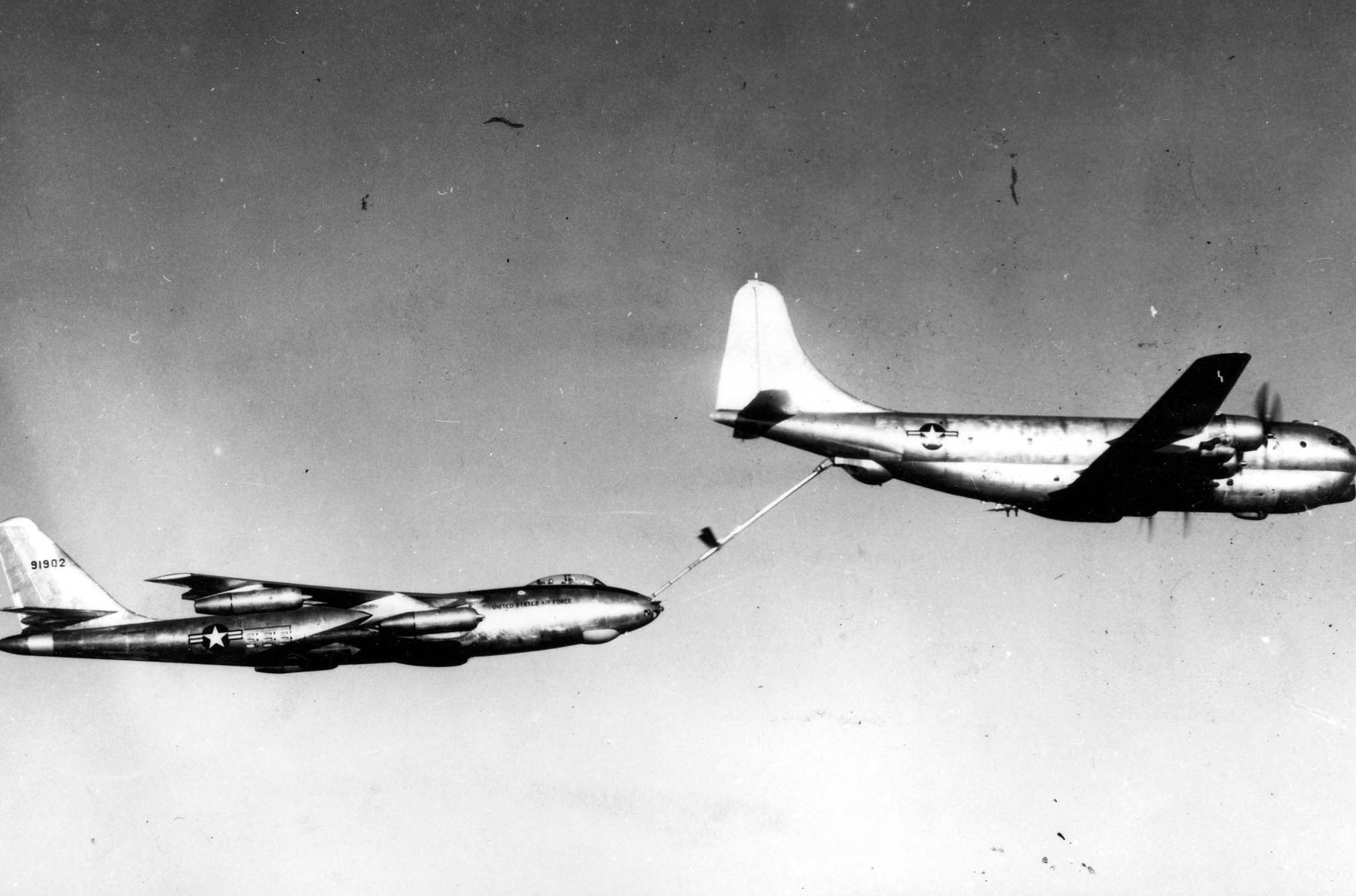
B-47 and KC-97 as flown by the wing

The wing began to fly strategic reconnaissance missions in September 1953. The following year, it replaced its RB-29s with the jet Boeing RB-47 Stratojet, with the first B-47E arriving on 25 June, although crews had begun training in March. One year later, the wing deployed as a unit to Eielson Air Force Base, Alaska from 5 May until 31 August 1955, where it performed the final mapping of Alaska. With the assignment of the 90th Air Refueling Squadron in 1955, the wing began to fly air refueling missions as well as reconnaissance flights. In May 1958, the wing returned to the training mission serving as a combat crew training wing for RB-47 aircrews until it was inactivated on 20 June 1960. The wing's personnel and equipment were transferred to the 40th Bombardment Wing, which moved to Forbes on paper from Schilling Air Force Base, Kansas the same day. The 90th Air Refueling Squadron was reassigned to the 40th Wing upon that wing's arrival at Forbes.

=== Strategic missiles ===
The wing was again organized in July 1963 at Francis E. Warren Air Force Base, Wyoming as the 90th Strategic Missile Wing. The LGM-30B Minuteman I missiles of the wing would replace the SM-65 Atlas missiles of the inactivating 389th Strategic Missile Wing. The replacement Minutemen would be more widely displaced and hardened than the Atlases they replaced.

Initially, the wing supervised missile facility construction until July 1964, with its individual squadrons activating between October 1963 and July 1964 as missile launch facilities became operational. The wing was initially equipped with 200 LGM-30B Minuteman I, equipped with a single reentry vehicle. Beginning in June 1973, the Minuteman I missiles began to be replaced by LGM-30G Minuteman IIIs, which could carry up to three reentry vehicles, with the 400th Strategic Missile Squadron becoming the first Minuteman III squadron in the wing. The changeout was completed by October 1974. However, in 2001 and in compliance with the Strategic Arms Reduction Treaty, these missiles were limited to a single reentry vehicle

The wing supervised LGM-118 Peacekeeper personnel training and facility preparation beginning Jun 1985. The Peacekeeper, which could carry ten independently targeted reentry vehicles, was fully operational with the wing's 400th Strategic Missile Squadron on 30 December 1986. The Peacekeeper system continued in operation in addition to the wing's Minuteman missiles until September 2005, when it was retired and the 400th Squadron inactivated.

Although it remained a component of Twentieth Air Force, starting in 1992, the wing was reassigned under three different major commands over the next twenty years. When SAC was inactivated on 1 June 1992, the wing, along with its other combat missile units, became part of Air Combat Command. On 1 July 1993, after being redesignated as the 90th Space Wing, and with the idea to take advantage of the similarities between the missile and other space missions, the wing became part of Air Force Space Command. On 1 December 2009, the wing and other missile wings were reunited with the global bomber force under Air Force Global Strike Command.

== Lineage ==
- Established as the 90th Bombardment Wing, Medium on 20 December 1950

Activated on 2 January 1951
Redesignated 90 Strategic Reconnaissance Wing, Medium on 16 June 1952 (Note: In an apparent repeated typo, both Ravenstein and Robertson give this date as 1956. Ravenstein, p. 123, Robertson, Factsheet, 90 Missile Wing. However, compare Maurer, Combat Squadrons, pp. 390, 392, 394 (redesignation of 319th, 320th and 321st Strategic Reconnaissance Squadrons in 1952).)

- Discontinued on 20 June 1960
- Redesignated 90 Strategic Missile Wing (ICBM-Minuteman) on 21 February 1963

Organized on 1 July 1963
Redesignated 90 Missile Wing on 1 September 1991
Redesignated 90 Space Wing on 1 October 1992
Redesignated 90 Missile Wing on 1 July 2008

=== Assignments ===
- Fifteenth Air Force, 2 January 1951 (attached to 92d Bombardment Wing until 31 January 1951)
- 21st Air Division, 14 March 1951 – 20 June 1960
- Strategic Air Command, 21 February 1963 (not organized)
- 13th Strategic Missile Division, 1 July 1963
- 821st Strategic Aerospace Division, 2 July 1966
- 4th Strategic Missile Division (later 4th Air Division), 30 Jun 1971
- Fifteenth Air Force, 23 August 1988
- Twentieth Air Force, 1 September 1991 – present

=== Operational components ===
Groups

- 90th Bombardment Group (later 90 Operations Group): 2 January 1951 – 16 June 1952, 1 September 1991 – present

Squadrons.

- 90th Air Refueling Squadron: 5 August 1955 – 20 June 1960
- 319th Bombardment Squadron (later 319th Strategic Reconnaissance Squadron, 319th Strategic Missile Squadron): attached 16 February 1951 – 15 June 1952, assigned 16 June 1952 – 20 June 1960, 1 October 1963 – 1 September 1991
- 320th Bombardment Squadron (later 320th Strategic Reconnaissance Squadron, 320th Strategic Missile Squadron): attached 16 February 1951 – 15 June 1952, assigned 16 June 1952 – 20 June 1960, 8 January 1964 – 1 September 1991
- 321st Bombardment Squadron (later 321st Strategic Reconnaissance Squadron, 321st Strategic Missile Squadron): attached 16 February 1951 – 15 June 1952, assigned 16 June 1952 – 20 June 1960, 9 April 1964 – 1 September 1991
- 400th Strategic Missile Squadron: 1 July 1964 – 1 September 1991

=== Stations ===
- Fairchild Air Force Base, Washington, 2 January 1951
- Forbes Air Force Base, Kansas, 14 March 1951 – 20 June 1960
- Francis E. Warren Air Force Base, Wyoming 1 July 1963 – present

=== Aircraft and Missiles ===
- Boeing B-29 Superfortress, 1951–1954
- Boeing RB-29 Superfortress, 1951, 1952–1954
- Boeing TB-29 Superfortress, 1951–1952
- Boeing KB-29 Superfortress, 1953–1954
- Boeing RB-47 Stratojet, 1954–1960
- Boeing KC-97 Stratofreighter, 1955–1960
- LGM-30B Minuteman I, 1964–1974
- LGM-30G Minuteman III, 1973–present
- LGM-118 Peacekeeper, 1986–2005
- Bell UH-1 Huey, 1993–2015

=== Awards and campaigns ===
Award streamer	Award	Dates	Notes
	Air Force Outstanding Unit Award	1 July 1968 – 30 June 1969	90th Strategic Missile Wing
	Air Force Outstanding Unit Award	1 July 1973 – 30 June 1975	90th Strategic Missile Wing
	Air Force Outstanding Unit Award	1 July 1982 – 30 June 1984	90th Strategic Missile Wing
	Air Force Outstanding Unit Award	1 July 1987 – 30 June 1989	90th Strategic Missile Wing
	Air Force Outstanding Unit Award	1 October 1994 – 30 September 1995	90th Space Wing
	Air Force Outstanding Unit Award	1 September 1996 – 31 August 1998	90th Space Wing
	Air Force Outstanding Unit Award	1 October 1999 – 30 September 2000	90th Space Wing
	Air Force Outstanding Unit Award	1 January 2001 – 31 December 2001	90th Space Wing
	Air Force Outstanding Unit Award	1 October 2003 – 30 September 2005	90th Space Wing
	Air Force Outstanding Unit Award	1 October 2005 – 30 September 2007	90th Space Wing
	Air Force Outstanding Unit Award	1 June 2008 – 31 May 2010	90th Space Wing (later 90th Missile Wing)
	Air Force Outstanding Unit Award	1 January 2011 – 31 December 2012	90th Missile Wing

The wing won the SAC missile combat competition and the Blanchard Trophy in 1973 and 1984 and in 2010 and 2011 as the best missile wing in Air Force Global Strike Command. It was awarded the Omaha Trophy as the most outstanding wing in SAC in 1983 and in 2007 as the best missile wing in United States Strategic Command. The unit won the Col Lowell F. McAdoo trophy for best missile wing operations in SAC and the Lee R. Williams trophy as the most outstanding missile wing in 1988. In 1989, the wing's maintenance complex won the Chadwell Trophy as the best missile maintenance unit in SAC and repeated in 1992 as the best in Air Combat Command. Individual squadrons of the wing have won other command competition awards, including two additional awards of the Blanchard Trophy.

== See also ==
- List of USAF Strategic Missile Wings assigned to Strategic Air Command
- List of USAF Reconnaissance Wings assigned to Strategic Air Command
- List of USAF Bomb Wings and Wings assigned to Strategic Air Command
- List of B-29 Superfortress operators
- List of B-47 units of the United States Air Force
- 90th Missile Wing LGM-30 Minuteman Missile Launch Sites
