= 90th Operations Group =

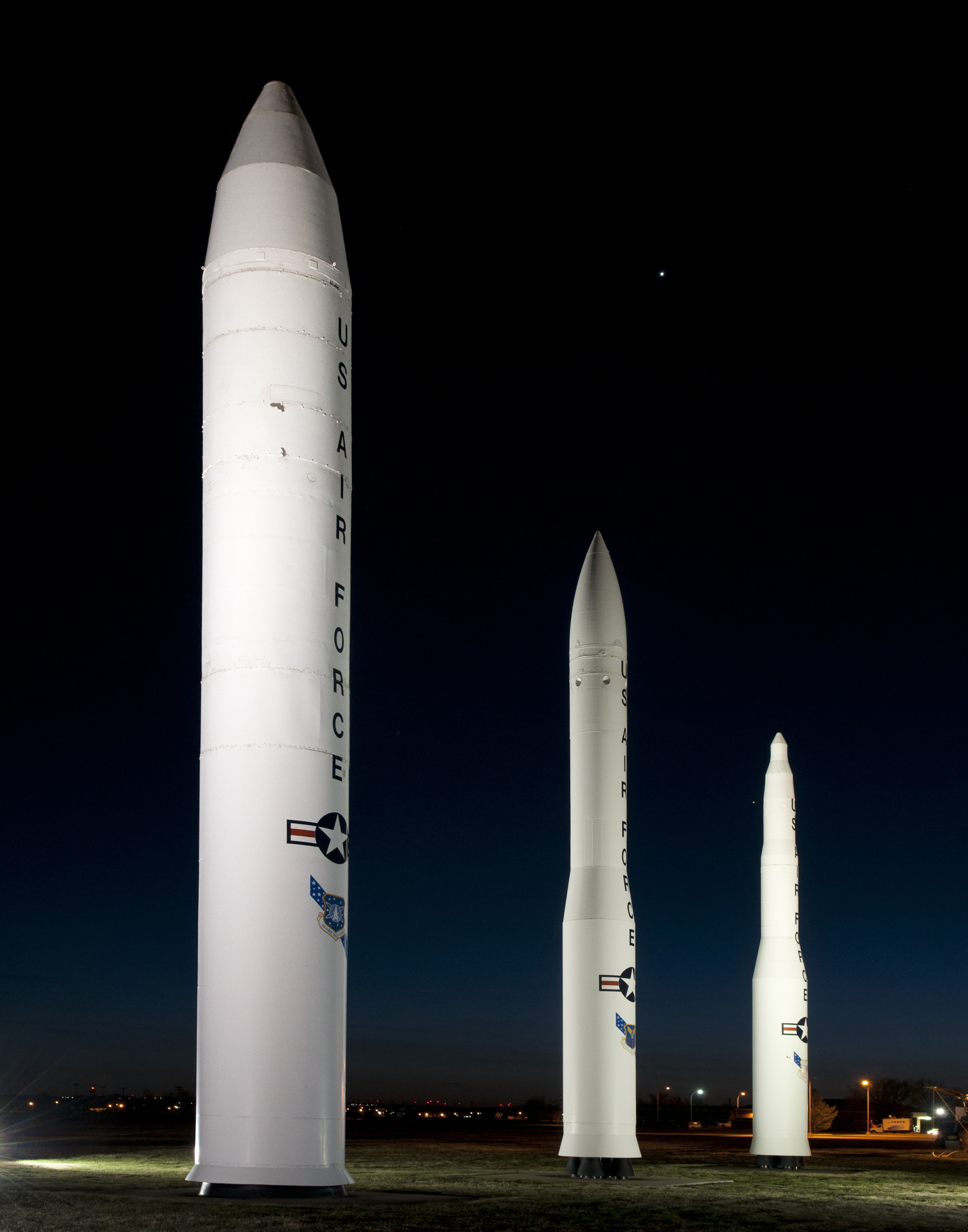
- Minuteman and Peacekeeper missiles at F.E. Warren AFB
- Active: 1942–1946; 1947–1948; 1951–1952; 1991–present
- Country: United States
- Branch: United States Air Force
- Role: Intercontinental ballistic missile operations
- Nickname: Jolly Rogers (World War II)
- Motto: Impavide Latin Undauntedly
- Engagements: Southwest Pacific Theater
- Decorations: Distinguished Unit Citation; Air Force Outstanding Unit Award; Philippine Presidential Unit Citation

Insignia
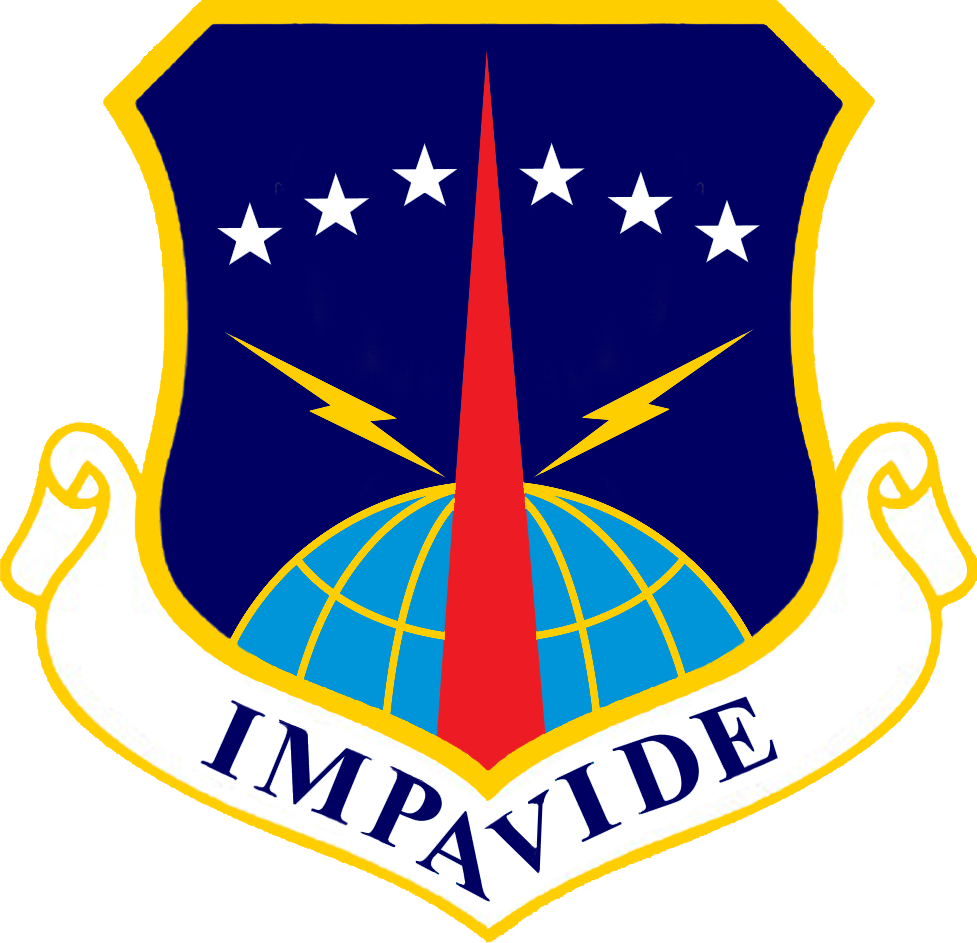
- Emblem of the 90th Operations Group

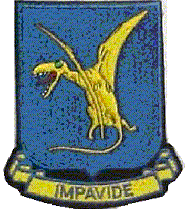
- 90th Bombardment Group emblem (approved 22 September 1942)

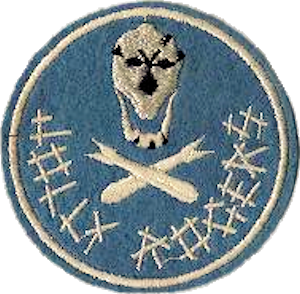
- Unofficial 90th Bombardment Group emblem used in the Southwest Pacific (Note: This emblem was also used as the group tail marking. Each squadron in the group used the emblem with the squadron color as the background. Watkins, pp. 86–87)

The 90th Operations Group is the operational component of the 90th Missile Wing of the United States Air Force. It is stationed at Francis E. Warren Air Force Base, Wyoming, and is assigned to Twentieth Air Force of Air Force Global Strike Command. The group is responsible for maintaining and operating on alert the wing's assigned LGM-30G Minuteman III intercontinental ballistic missiles.

The Air Force Historical Research Agency traces the unit's origins to the 90th Bombardment Group of the Second World War. From 1942 to 1944 the 90th Bombardment Group flew Consolidated B-24 Liberators to bomb Japanese targets, operating from Australia and then New Guinea. It was awarded two United States Distinguished Unit Citations and the Philippine Presidential Unit Citation for its combat service in China, the Netherlands East Indies, New Guinea, the Bismarck Archipelago, Leyte, and Luzon. It was inactivated in the Philippines in early 1946.

The group was activated in July 1947 at Andrews Field, Maryland by Strategic Air Command (SAC), but appears not to have been manned before inactivating in September 1948. It was again activated by SAC at Fairchild Air Force Base in January 1951 and began equipping with Boeing B-29 Superfortress bombers, but a reorganization the following month reduced the group to paper status until it again inactivated in June 1952.

== Overview ==
The 90th Operations Group operates 150 LGM-30G Minuteman III intercontinental ballistic missiles on full alert 24 hours a day, 365 days a year. Its missiles are dispersed in hardened silos over a 9,600-square-mile (25,000 km^{2}) area in three states to protect against attack and are connected to underground missile alert facilities through a system of hardened cables. It is composed of three missile squadrons, an operations support squadron and a standardization and evaluation element. Each missile squadron is responsible for five missile alert facilities and 50 Minuteman III ICBMs. Its units include the 319th, 320th and 321st Missile Squadrons and the 90th Operations Support Squadron.

== History ==
=== World War II ===
The group was first organized as the 90th Bombardment Group at Key Field, Mississippi in April 1942 as a Consolidated B-24 Liberator unit. The group's original squadrons were the 10th Reconnaissance Squadron and the 319th, 320th and 321st Bombardment Squadrons, although within a week of activation the 10th was renamed the 400th Bombardment Squadron. The group trained with Liberators in the southeastern United States under III Bomber Command until August.

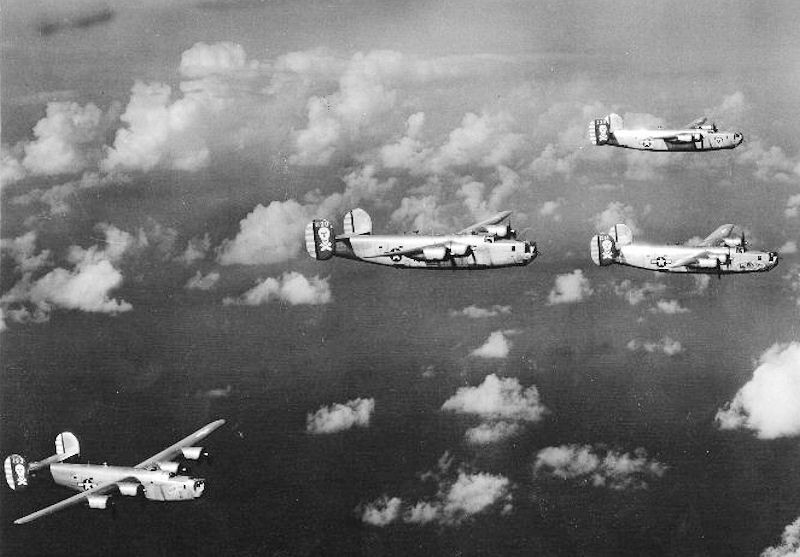
"Jolly Rogers" of the 90th Bombardment Group on a mission, 1943

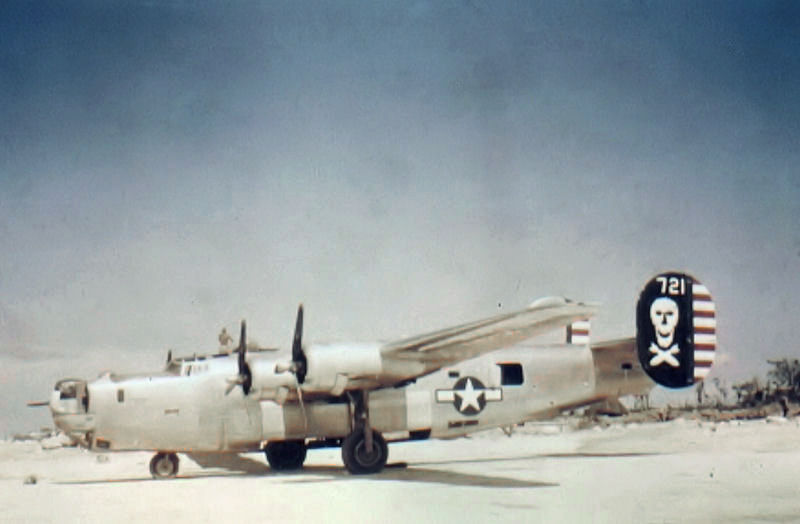
B-24J with the distinct nose turret, probably in 1944.

The group moved to Willow Run Airport, Michigan for conversion training on newly manufactured Ford Liberators. Assigned to VII Bomber Command with B-24Ds, The unit moved to Hickam Field, Hawaii in September. The group arrived in northern Queensland, Australia in November 1942 and began bombardment missions under V Bomber Command almost immediately.

The group attacked enemy airfields, troop concentrations, ground installations and shipping in New Guinea, the Bismarck Archipelago, Palau and the southern Philippines. The group was awarded a Distinguished Unit Citation for operations in Papua through January 1943, (Note: Robertson gives the period as July 1942 – January 1943, but the unit did not fly combat until November 1942. AF Pamphlet 900-2 gives the period as 23 July 1942 – 23 January 1943, citing War Department General Order 21, 1943. AFP 900-2, p. 257. V Bomber Command was awarded a DUC for the same period by the same order, so it would appear the award was to all combat groups of V Bomber Command without adjusting for units that arrived in theater after July. AFP 900-2, p. 63) The unit participated in the Battle of Bismarck Sea in March 1943, and earned another citation for strikes on enemy airfields at Wewak, New Guinea in September 1943 despite heavy flak and fighter opposition.

During 1944, the 90th supported the New Guinea Campaign through the end of June, then made long-range raids on oil refineries at Balikpapan, Borneo, in September and October. In January 1945, the group moved to the Philippines and supported ground forces on Luzon, attacked industrial targets on Formosa, and bombed railways, airfields, and harbor facilities on the Asiatic mainland. Shortly before the end of the war in the Pacific, the 90th moved to Okinawa, from which it would be able to strike the Japanese home islands.

After VJ Day, the group flew reconnaissance missions over Japan and ferried Allied prisoners of war from Okinawa to Manila. Ceased operations by November 1945. The group was inactivated in the Philippines in early 1946.

=== Strategic Air Command Bombardment ===
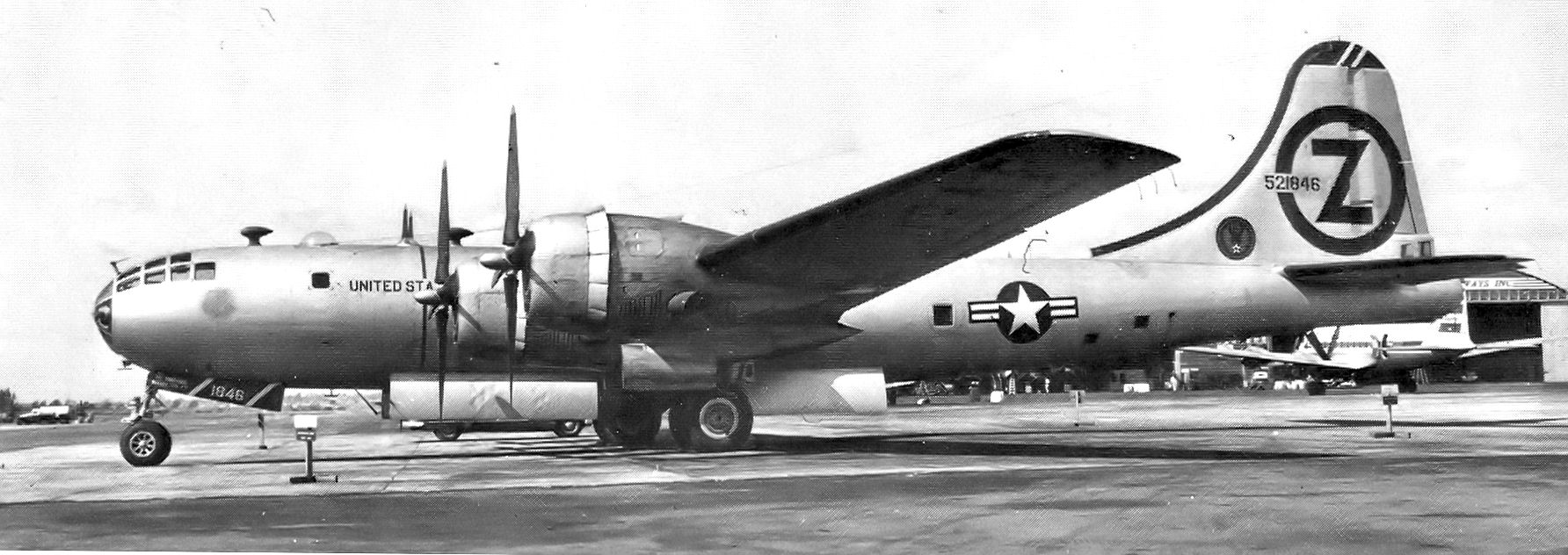
90th Boeing B-29 (Note: Aircraft is Boeing B-29-100-BW Superfortress serial 45-21846)

The group was reactivated in July 1947 as a very heavy group at Andrews Field, Maryland, one of seven bombardment groups activated at Andrews by Strategic Air Command (SAC) that day. Most of these groups, including the 90th, were inactivated by September 1948 and it does not appear they were manned during this period.

The group was again activated at Fairchild Air Force Base, Washington in January 1951 and was assigned to the 90th Bombardment Wing under the wing/base organization system. At Fairchild, it began to equip with Boeing B-29 Superfortress bombers, receiving five B-29s by the end of the month. However, as SAC mobilized for the Korean War it found that its wing commanders focused too much on running the base organization and were not spending enough time on overseeing combat preparations. To allow wing commanders the ability to focus on combat operations and the maintenance necessary to support combat aircraft, the combat and maintenance squadrons were attached directly to the wing on 16 February 1951 and the group became a paper organization. On 16 June 1952, this organization, referred to as the Dual Deputy organization, was made permanent and the group was inactivated and its squadrons were assigned directly to the wing.

=== Missile operations ===
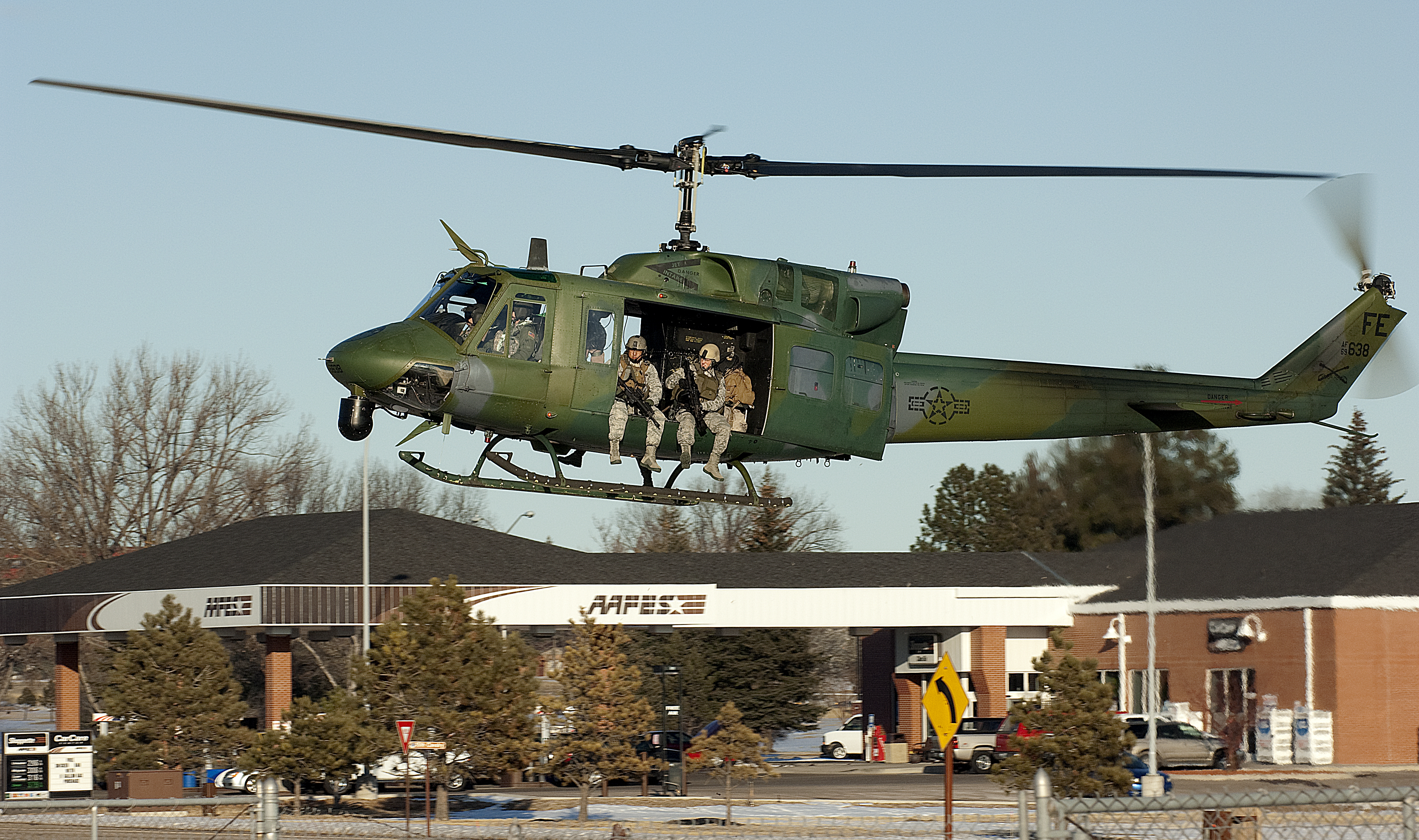
90th Wing security forces prepare to jump out of a 37th Squadron UH-1N at Warren AFB

The group was redesignated the 90th Operations Group and reactivated at Francis E. Warren Air Force Base, Wyoming in September 1991 as the operational component of the 90th Missile Wing when the wing converted to the Objective Wing Organization. The group was assigned operational control of the wing's four missile squadrons, three of which operated 150 LGM-30G Minuteman III missiles and one of which operated 50 LGM-118A Peacekeeper missiles, plus an operational support squadron.

In February 1993, the 37th Rescue Squadron, whose Bell UH-1 Huey helicopters helped provide operational and logistical support to remote missile sites, was transferred to the group after Air Rescue Service was inactivated. The 37th, under various designations, remained under the group until August 2014, when Twentieth Air Force formed a provisional helicopter group to control the squadrons supporting its missile operations. In January 2015, the 37th Helicopter Squadron was transferred to the 582d Helicopter Group, but continued to provide the same support to the 90th's missile sites.

The wing began retiring its Peacekeeper missiles in 2001 in accordance with the Strategic Offensive Reductions Treaty. The last Peacekeeper was removed from alert in 2005 and the 400th Missile Squadron, which operated them, was inactivated in September 2005. The group's Minuteman III squadrons continue to maintain nuclear alert.

== Lineage ==
- Established as the 90th Bombardment Group (Heavy) on 28 January 1942

Activated on 15 April 1942
Redesignated 90 Bombardment Group, Heavy on 20 August 1943
Inactivated on 27 January 1946

- Redesignated 90 Bombardment Group, Very Heavy on 11 June 1947

Activated on 1 July 1947
Inactivated on 6 September 1948

- Redesignated 90 Bombardment Group, Medium on 20 December 1950

Activated on 2 January 1951
Inactivated on 16 June 1952

- Redesignated 90 Operations Group on 29 August 1991

Activated on 1 September 1991

=== Assignments ===
- III Bomber Command, 15 April 1942
- VII Bomber Command, 12 September 1942
- V Bomber Command, November 1942 (attached to 310th Bombardment Wing, 31 May – 3 September 1944; 15 January – 23 November 1945)
- Far East Air Forces, 23 November 1945 – 27 January 1946
- Strategic Air Command, 1 July 1947 – 6 September 1948
- 90th Bombardment Wing, 2 January 1951 – 16 June 1952
- 90th Missile Wing (later 90th Space Wing 90th Missile Wing), 1 September 1991 – present

=== Components ===
- 10th Reconnaissance Squadron (later 400th Bombardment Squadron, 400th Missile Squadron), 15 April 1942 – 27 January 1946; 1 July 1947 – 6 September 1948; 2 January 1951 – 16 June 1952 (attached to 90th Bombardment Wing after 14 February 1951); 1 September 1991 – 19 September 2005
- 37th Rescue Squadron (later 37th Rescue Flight, 37th Helicopter Flight, 37 Helicopter Squadron), 1 February 1993 – 6 January 2015 (attached to 20th Air Force Helicopter Operations Group after 1 August 2014)
- 90th Operations Support Squadron, 1 September 1991 – present
- 319th Bombardment Squadron (later 319 Missile Squadron), 15 April 1942 – 27 January 1946; 1 July 1947 – 6 September 1948; 2 January 1951 – 16 June 1952 (attached to 90th Bombardment Wing after 16 February 1951); 1 September 1991 – present
- 320th Bombardment Squadron (later 320 Missile Squadron), 15 April 1942 – 27 January 1946; 1 July 1947 – 6 September 1948; 2 January 1951 – 16 June 1952(attached to 90th Bombardment Wing after 16 February 1951); 1 September 1991 – present
- 321st Bombardment Squadron (later 321 Missile Squadron), 15 April 1942 – 27 January 1946; 1 July 1947 – 6 September 1948; 2 January 1951 – 16 June 1952(attached to 90th Bombardment Wing after 16 February 1951); 1 September 1991 – present

=== Stations ===
- Key Field, Mississippi, 15 April 1942
- Barksdale Field, Louisiana, 17 May 1942
- Greenville Army Air Base, South Carolina, 21 June 1942
- Willow Run Airport, Michigan, 9 August 1942
- Camp Stoneman, California, 29 August – 3 September 1942 (ground echelon)
- Hickam Field, Hawaii, September 1942
- Iron Range Airfield, Australia, November 1942
- Port Moresby Airfield Complex, New Guinea, 10 February 1943
- Dobodura Airfield Complex, New Guinea, 22 December 1943
- Nadzab Airfield Complex, New Guinea, 23 February 1944
- Wakde Airfield, Netherlands East Indies, 22 June 1944
- Mokmer Airfield, Biak, Netherlands East Indies, 10 August 1944
- McGuire Field, Mindoro, Philippines, 26 January 1945
- Ie Shima, Okinawa, c. 10 August 1945
- Fort William McKinley, Luzon, Philippines, December 1945 – 26 January 1946
- Andrews Field (later Andrews Air Force Base), Maryland, 1 July 1947 – 6 September 1948
- Fairchild Air Force Base, Washington, 2 January 1951
- Forbes Air Force Base, Kansas, 14 March 1951 – 16 June 1952
- Francis E. Warren Air Force Base, Wyoming, 1 September 1991 – present

=== Aircraft and missiles ===
- Consolidated B-24 Liberator, 1942–1945
- Boeing B-29 Superfortress, 1951
- LGM-30G Minuteman III, 1991–present
- LGM-118A Peacekeeper, 1991–2005
- Bell UH-1 Huey, 1993–2015

=== Awards and campaigns ===
Award streamer	Award	Dates	Notes
	Distinguished Unit Citation	November 1942-23 January 1943	Papua, 90th Bombardment Group
	Distinguished Unit Citation	13 and 15 September 1943	New Guinea, 90th Bombardment Group
	Air Force Outstanding Unit Award	[1 September] 1991 – 31 July 1993	90th Operations Group
	Air Force Outstanding Unit Award	1 October 1994 – 30 September 1995	90th Operations Group
	Air Force Outstanding Unit Award	1 September 1996 – 31 August 1998	90th Operations Group
	Air Force Outstanding Unit Award	1 October 1999 – 30 September 2000	90th Operations Group
	Air Force Outstanding Unit Award	1 January 2001 – 31 December 2001	90th Operations Group
	Air Force Outstanding Unit Award	1 October 2003 – 30 September 2005	90th Operations Group
	Air Force Outstanding Unit Award	1 October 2005 – 30 September 2007	90th Operations Group
	Air Force Outstanding Unit Award	1 October 2007 – 30 September 2008	90th Operations Group
	Philippine Republic Presidential Unit Citation	17 October 1944 – 4 July 1945	90th Bombardment Group

. Philippine Presidential Unit Citation (WWII).

Campaign Streamer	Campaign	Dates	Notes
	Guadalcanal	November 1942-21 February 1943	90th Bombardment Group
	Papua	November-23 January 1943	90th Bombardment Group
	Northern Solomons	23 February 1943 – 21 November 1944	90th Bombardment Group
	Bismarck Archipelago	15 December 1943 – 27 November 1944	90th Bombardment Group
	New Guinea	24 January 1943 – 31 December 1944	90th Bombardment Group
	Leyte	17 October 1944 – 1 July 1945	90th Bombardment Group
	Luzon	15 December 1944 – 4 July 1945	90th Bombardment Group
	Southern Philippines	27 February 1945 – 4 July 1945	90th Bombardment Group
	China Defensive	November 1942-4 May 1945	90th Bombardment Group
	China Offensive	5 May 1945 – 2 September 1945	90th Bombardment Group
	Air Offensive, Japan	November 1942-2 September 1945	90th Bombardment Group
	Western Pacific	17 April 1944 – 2 September 1945	90th Bombardment Group

== See also ==
- United States Army Air Forces in Australia
- B-24 Liberator units of the United States Army Air Forces
- List of B-29 Superfortress operators
