= Boeing MH-139 Grey Wolf =

Military utility helicopter model by Boeing

MH-139 Grey Wolf
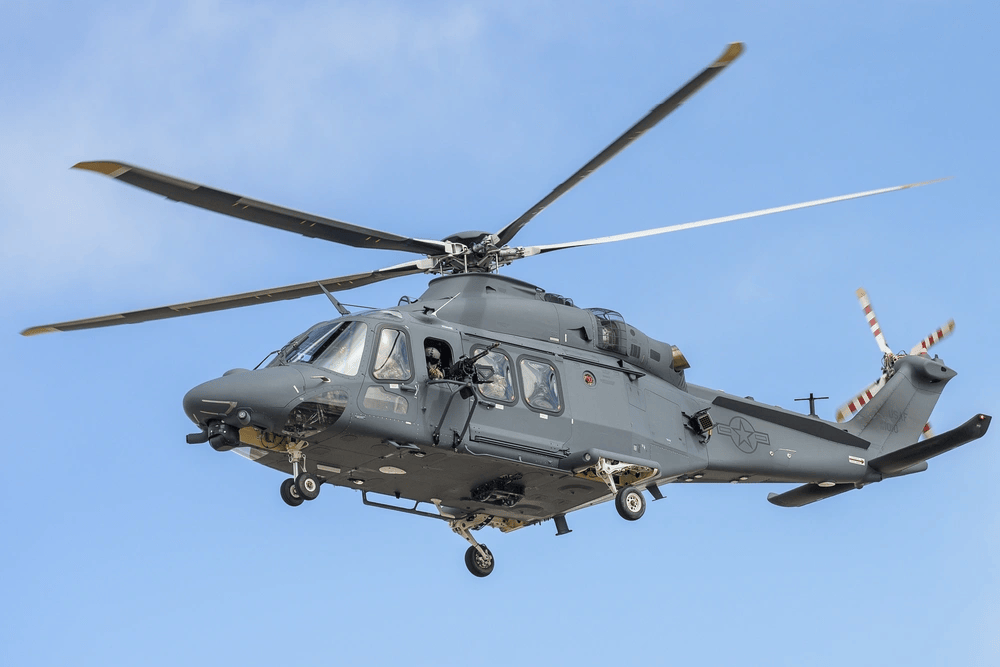

General information
- Type: Medium lift helicopter
- National origin: Italy/United States
- Manufacturer: Boeing; Leonardo
- Status: In service, in production
- Primary user: United States Air Force

History
- Introduction date: 2020
- First flight: 2019
- Developed from: AgustaWestland AW139

The Boeing MH-139 Grey Wolf is a twin-engine helicopter operated by the United States Air Force (USAF) for security and support missions. Built under licence by Boeing, the Grey Wolf is a variant of the Leonardo AW139, an Italian-built multi-role helicopter.

== Development ==
On 24 September 2018, the U.S. Air Force awarded Boeing a $2.4 billion contract to replace the aging UH-1N helicopter fleet, with the goal of enhancing security patrols of nuclear missile fields and transporting senior officials. This was the first major acquisition for the Air Force Global Strike Command in its 10-year history, following the cancellation of the previous Common Vertical Lift Support Program (CVLSP). As part of this initiative, Boeing was awarded a $285-million contract to build the first 13 MH-139A Grey Wolf helicopters, to guard America's nuclear ballistic missiles.

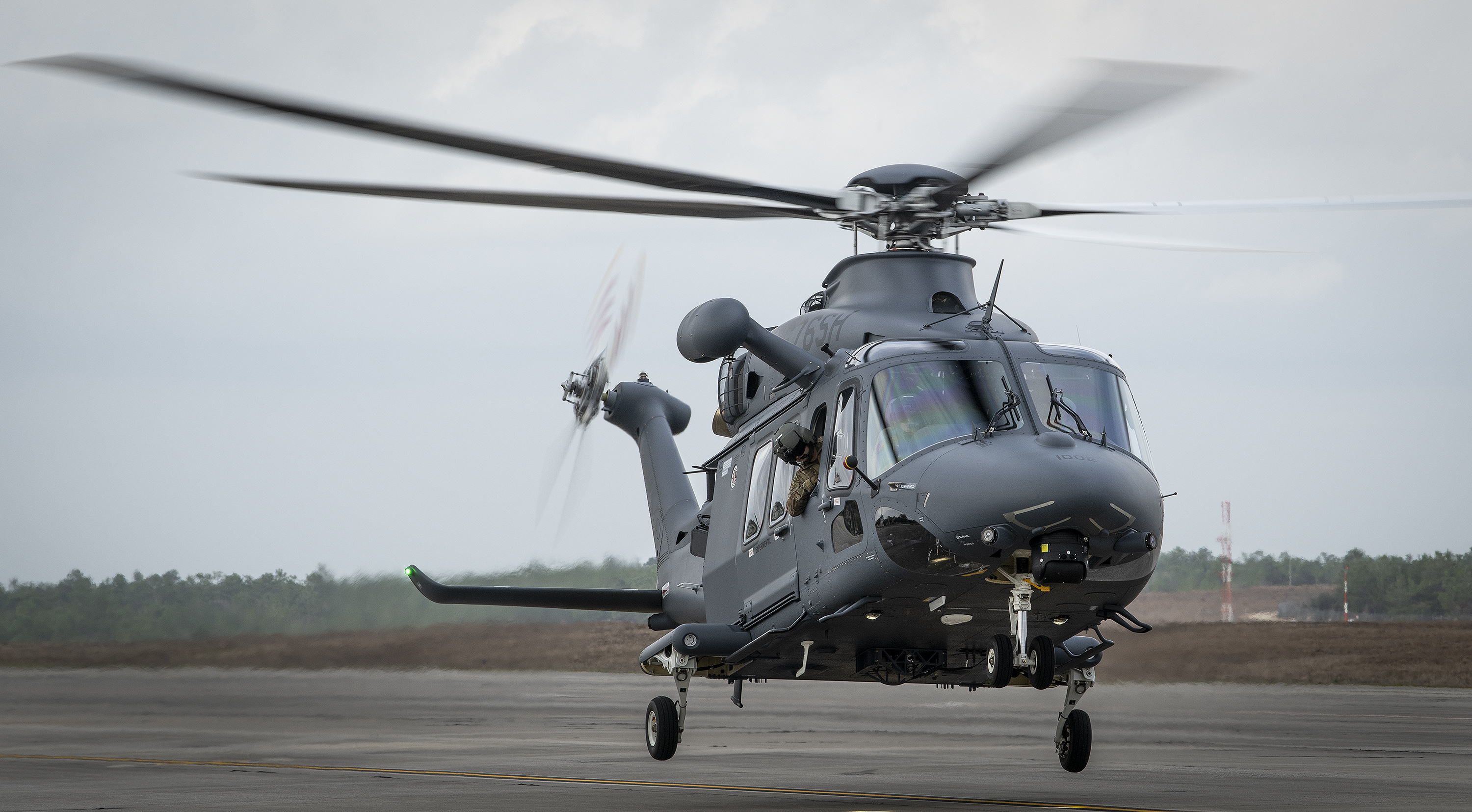
The MH-139A Grey Wolf takes its first combined test flight on February 11, 2020, at Eglin Air Force Base.

The MH-139A Grey Wolf is used for security patrols, search and rescue missions, and personnel and cargo transport. The Air Force's first intention was to purchase 84 helicopters for security and transportation across extensive intercontinental ballistic missile (ICBM) fields, and senior leader and executive airlift in the Air Defense Identification Zone (ADIZ), also known as the National Capital Region. It is also to be used in aircrew survival training.

The precise quantity of the MH-139 fleet remains unknown. Initially, the requirement was for up to 84 helicopters, which was then reduced to 80, then 74. The most recent Fiscal Year 2025 budget suggests a further reduction, to a fleet of 36 MH-139s. The Grey Wolf program has faced numerous setbacks and delays, including difficulty with attaining Federal Aviation Administration type certification. Typically, FAA certification is not required for US military aircraft, but it is for the MH-139 because the helicopters are to be required to operate extensively within US domestic airspace.

== Design ==
The helicopter is propelled by two FADEC-controlled Pratt & Whitney Canada PT6 turboshaft engines, housed in separate engine turbine burst containment boxes, each with independent inputs to the main gearbox. The engines' infrared signature has been decreased by lowering airflow and using a directed exhaust, reducing plume impingement upon the tail fuselage.

== Operational history ==
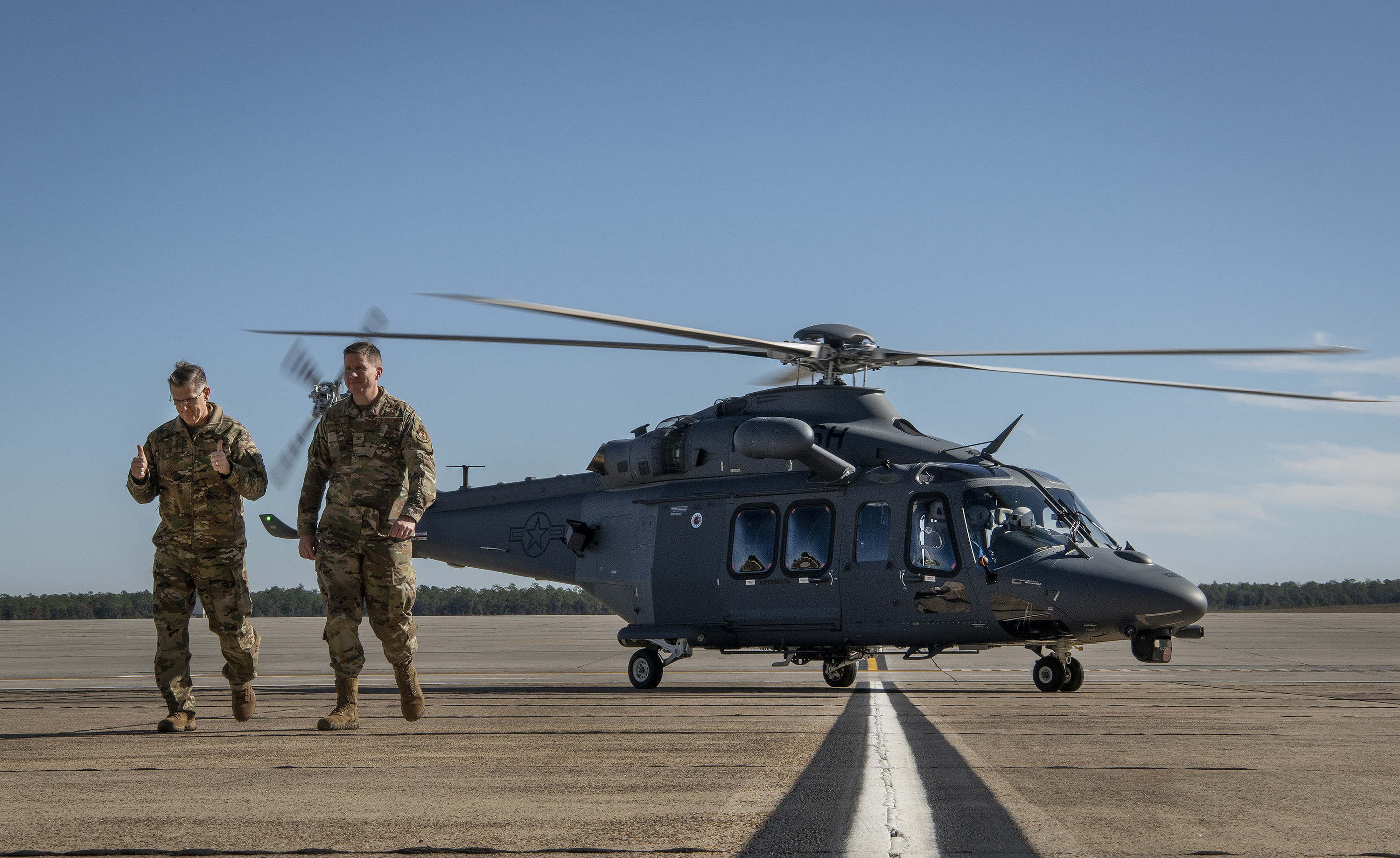
The Grey Wolf was unveiled and named during the ceremony at Duke Field, Florida.

In March 2024, the first field-ready MH-139 Grey Wolf arrived at Montana’s Malmstrom Air Force Base. The 341st Missile Wing captured footage of Malmstrom's first Grey Wolf arriving at the base. The 908th Airlift Wing introduced the MH-139A Grey Wolf helicopter at Maxwell Air Force Base on 31 May 2024. On 1 September 2023, the Pentagon issued a Selected Acquisition Report outlining plans to reintroduce 14 MH-139A Grey Wolf helicopters into the Air Force's program, bringing the total to at least 56 aircraft. This reverses a previous decision to cut the buy to 42 helicopters in the 2025 fiscal year, helping avoid a critical cost breach under Nunn-McCurdy.

As of 30 September 2025, 17 are in the USAF inventory.

On 8 January 2026, the MH-139 completed its first operational mission, with two units escorting a column of missile maintenance and armored security vehicles to and from a Minuteman III launch facility.

On 1 September 2026, Air Force Global Strike Command announced the MH-139 reached its initial operating capability the day before.

On 1 October 2026, Boeing announced it had received a contract of four MH-139A Grey Wolf helicopters for full-rate production at the cost of US$252.94 million.

== Operators ==
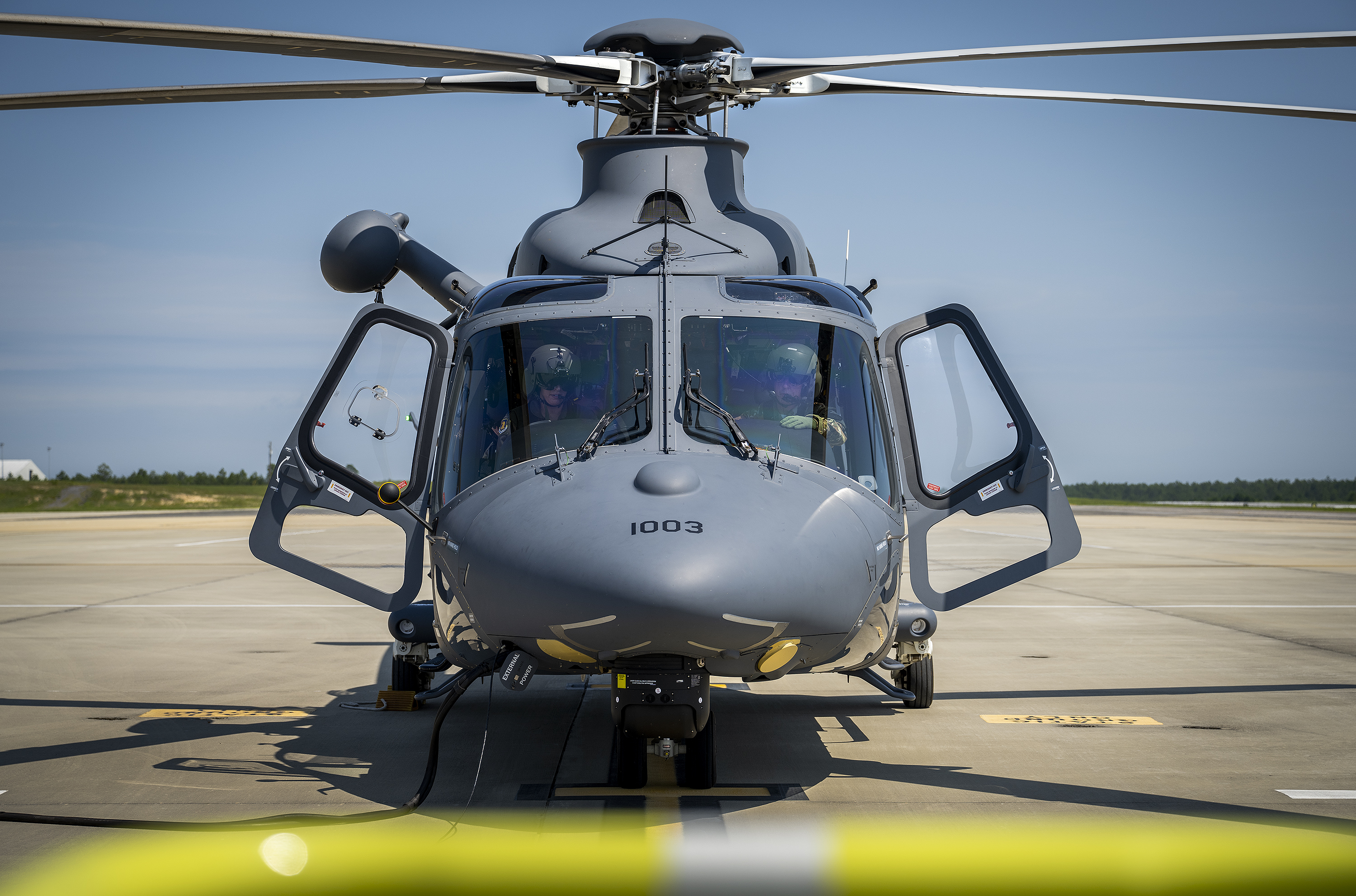
A MH-139 Grey Wolf of the 96th Test Wing during preflight checks at Eglin AFB, August 2022

United States

- United States Air Force - 27 delivered, including 20 low-rate initial production.15 more on order.
  - 96th Test Wing
    - 413th Flight Test Squadron
  - 582d Helicopter Group
    - 37th Helicopter Squadron – F. E. Warren Air Force Base, , Wyoming (Planned entry late 2026)
    - 40th Helicopter Squadron – Malmstrom Air Force Base, Montana
    - 54th Helicopter Squadron – Minot Air Force Base, North Dakota (Planned entry late 2026/early 2027)
  - 908th Flying Training Wing – Maxwell Air Force Base, Alabama
    - 703d Helicopter Squadron

== See also ==
Aircraft of comparable role, configuration, and era

- Airbus Helicopters H175
- Airbus Helicopters H225M
- Sikorsky UH-60 Black Hawk
- NHIndustries NH90
- Bell UH-1Y Venom

Related lists

- List of active United States military aircraft
- List of active United States Air Force aircraft
- List of utility helicopters
