= 35th Aeromedical Evacuation Squadron =

The 35th Aeromedical Evacuation Squadron was an aeromedical evacuation unit assigned to Air Force Reserve Command. The unit was stationed at Maxwell Air Force Base, Alabama and assigned to the 908th Airlift Wing. The 35th mission was to recruit, organize and train Air Force reservists for active duty in time of war, national emergency or when otherwise required. When mobilized, the mission of the 35th Aeromedical Evacuation Squadron was to provide in-flight medical care to the sick and wounded. In 1994 the unit was redesignated the 908th AES.

== History ==
The 35th Aeromedical Evacuation Squadron was activated in April 1961 at 401 Tuscaloosa Avenue, Birmingham Alabama. It was assigned to the 7th Aeromedical Evacuation Group, with headquarters at Greater Pittsburgh Airport PA. It received C-119 airlift support from the 908th Troop Carrier Group, Bates Field Alabama.

In 1966, the unit moved to the Birmingham Municipal Airport, and was assigned to the 445th Airlift Wing, Dobbins AFB, GA. The unit primary mission aircraft was changed to the C-124, Globemaster assigned to the 918th Military Airlift Wing, Dobbins AFB, GA.

In 1971, the 35th Aeromedical Squadron was re-designated the 35th Aeromedical Evacuation Flight, the primary mission aircraft was the C-7A Caribou. In August 1972, the Flight was moved to Maxwell AFB AL and was assigned to the 908th Tactical Airlift Group, the primary mission aircraft was the C-7A Caribou, a twin-engine utility transport.

During the 1960s and 1970s, members of the 35th Aeromedical Evacuation Unit were deployed in support of active forces during Vietnam and many other contingencies. In September 1971, 10 enlisted Medical Crew Members were activated and assigned to the 55th Aeromedical Evacuation Squadron (AES), 10th Aeromedical Evacuation Group (AEG), Travis AFB, Ca and the 56th AES, Yokota AB, Japan to support the active aeromedical evacuation units during "Operation Patch-up", which involved the movement of drug abuse patients back to the United States from Southwest Asia

In October 1983, the 35th converted to C-130E Hercules as their primary aircraft. Less than three years later, in June 1986, the unit aircraft changed to the new C-130Hs.

In 1990, the 35th Aeromedical Evacuation Flight was re-designated the 35th Aeromedical Evacuation Squadron, assigned to the 908th Airlift Wing, manning was increased to 21 medical crews, (42 flight nurses and 63 medical technicians).

In January 1991, medical support personnel from the 35th Aeromedical Evacuation Squadron were activated and deployed in support of Desert Storm. Members of the 35th Aeromedical Evacuation Squadron (flight nurses and medical technicians) were deployed to the Mildenhall RAB, United Kingdom to provide in-flight medical care aboard C-130s and C-141s, to evacuate casualties from the battle zone to hospitals in Europe and the Continental United States (CONUS).

In 1994 new regulations requiring units to have the same numerical designation as the parent wing resulted in the unit designation being changed to the 908th Aeromedical Evacuation Squadron, assigned to the 908th Airlift Wing.

== Lineage ==
- Constituted as the 35th Aeromedical Evacuation Squadron on 24 July 1960 and activated (not organized)
- Organized on 8 January 1961

Redesignated 35th Aeromedical Evacuation Flight on 1 December 1971
Redesignated 35th Aeromedical Evacuation Squadron c. 1990

- Redesignated 908th Aeromedical Evacuation Squadron on 1 October 1994

=== Assignments ===
- Continental Air Command, 24 July 1960 (not organized)
- 7th Aeromedical Evacuation Group, 8 January 1961
- 3d Air Force Reserve Region, 1 October 1965
- 918th Military Airlift Group, 1 January 1967
- 3d Air Force Reserve Region, 1 January 1968
- 918th Military Airlift Group (later 918th Tactical Airlift Group), 1 January 1969
- 908th Tactical Airlift Group (later 908th Airlift Group), 1 October 1972 – 1 August 1992
- 908th Operations Group, 1 August 1992 – 1 October 1994
