= 582nd Helicopter Group =

US Air Force unit

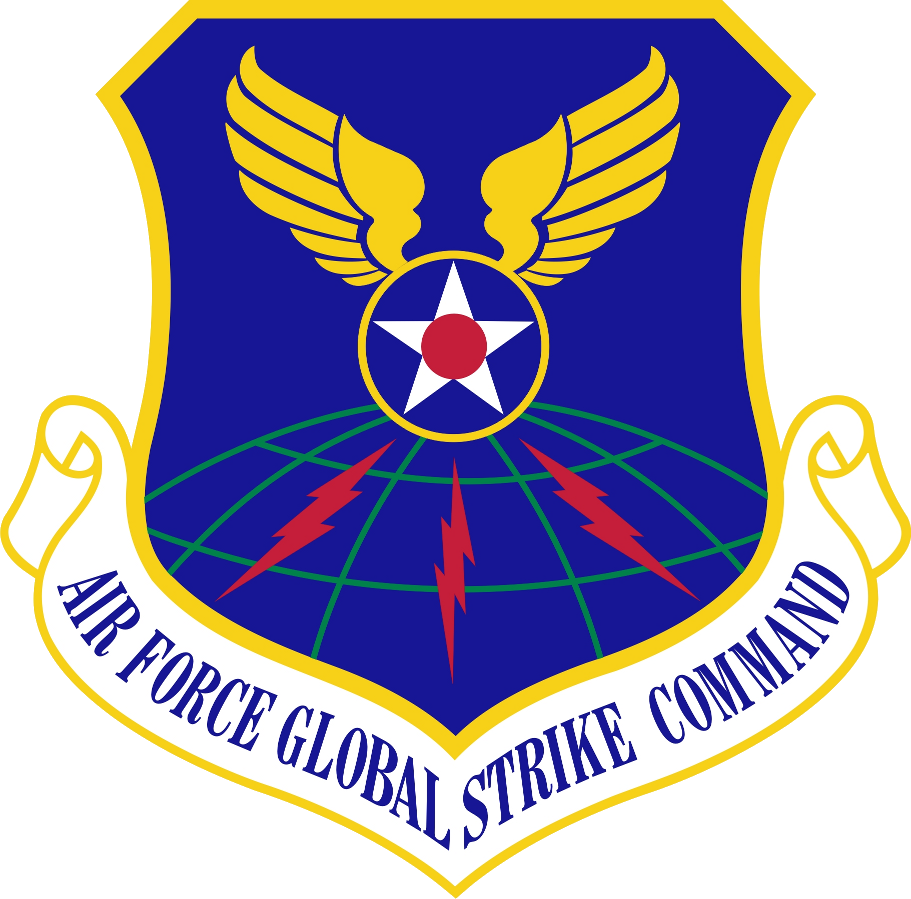
582nd Helicopter Group

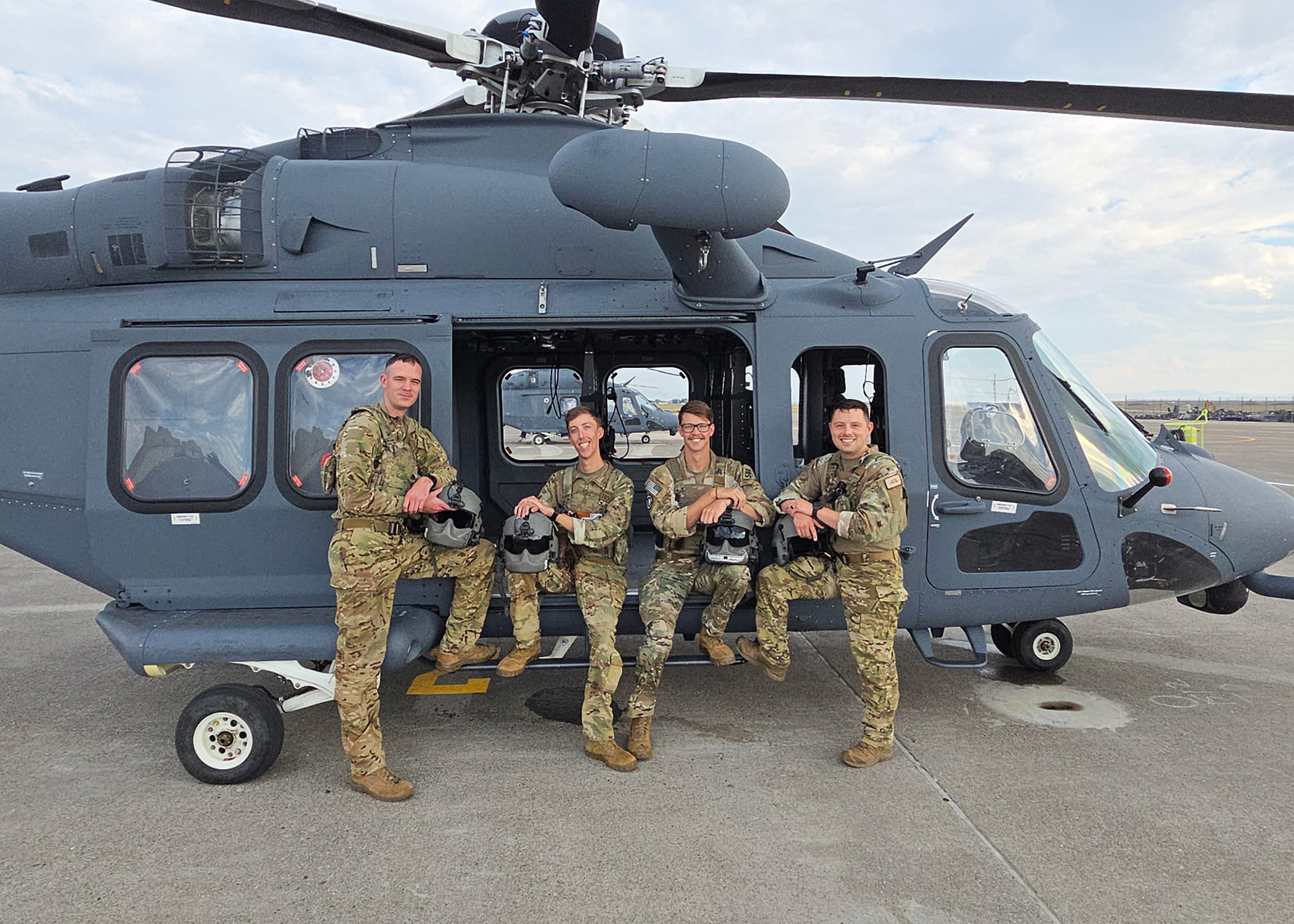
- 40th Helicopter Squadron aircrew in front of an MH-139A Grey Wolf at Malmstrom AFB
- Active: 1943-1958; 2015-present
- Country: United States
- Branch: United States Air Force
- Role: Helicopter support for missile wings
- Part of: Twentieth Air Force
- Garrison/HQ: F. E. Warren Air Force Base, Wyoming
- Nickname: Snafu Snatchers
- Engagements: Southwest Pacific Theater
- Decorations: Distinguished Unit Citation; Philippine Republic Presidential Unit Citation

Commanders
- Current commander: Col. Bryant Bevan

Insignia
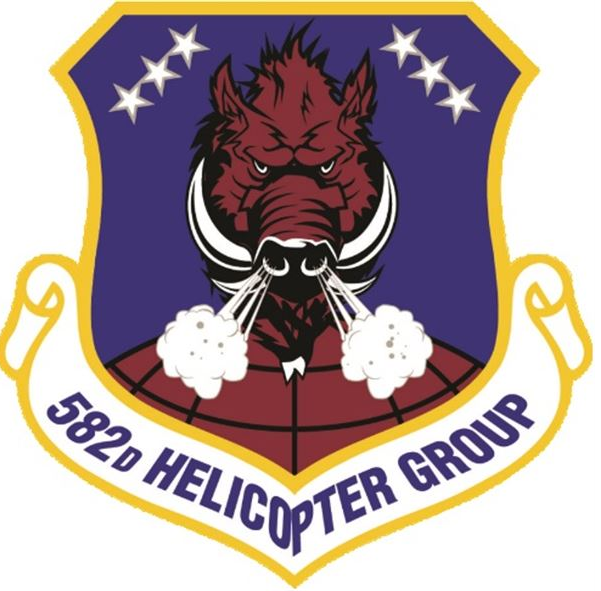
- 582nd Helicopter Group emblem

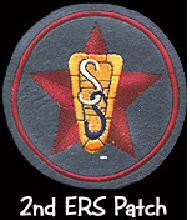
- 2nd Emergency Rescue Squadron patch (World War II)

Aircraft flown
- Multirole helicopter: Boeing MH-139A Grey Wolf
- Utility helicopter: Bell UH-1N Twin Huey

The 582nd Helicopter Group (officially, 582d Helicopter Group) was activated in January 2015 at F. E. Warren Air Force Base, Wyoming to provide a unified headquarters for the helicopter squadrons located on the intercontinental ballistic missile bases of Air Force Global Strike Command.

The group was first activated in 1943 as the 2nd Emergency Rescue Squadron at Hamilton Field, and after training, moved to the South Pacific Theater, where it served until the end of World War II, earning two Distinguished Unit Citations and a Philippine Republic Presidential Unit Citation for combat search and rescue and special operations missions. Following the end of the war, the squadron served as part of the occupation forces at Kadena Air Base, Okinawa from 1947 until 1950.

In May 1950 the squadron, now designated the 2nd Rescue Squadron, moved to Clark Air Base in the Philippines. In 1952, the unit was expanded to group level as the 2nd Air Rescue Group and its lettered flights became air rescue squadrons. The group provided rescue support for units of Thirteenth Air Force and the southwest Pacific until 1955, when it moved to Wheeler Air Force Base, where it became the headquarters for all rescue units in the Pacific. The group was inactivated at Wheeler in June 1958.

In 2015, the group was redesignated to its current name and activated at F. E. Warren, where it replaced a provisional unit that had been organized in 2014 to test the unification of helicopter units supporting missile wings under a single unit.

== History ==
=== World War II ===
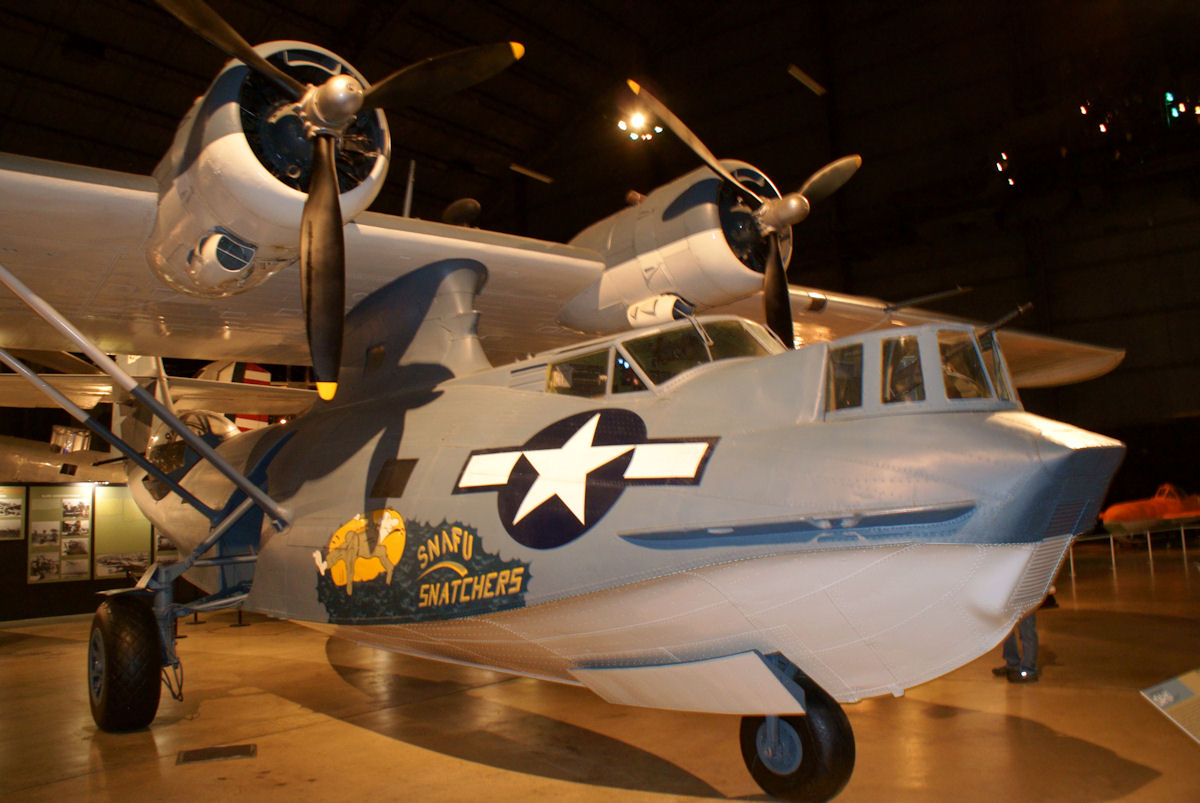
OA-10A Catalina at the National Museum of the United States Air Force (Note: Aircraft is restored as serial 44-33879 of the 2nd Emergency Rescue Squadron.)

The 582nd Helicopter Group was first activated in mid December 1943 as the 2nd Emergency Rescue Squadron at Hamilton Field, California, but remained a cadre only until the end of the month, when the squadron was brought up to full strength. In February, the unit moved by train to Gulfport Army Air Field, Mississippi, where it received its first aircraft, Consolidated OA-10 Catalinas, and began operational training. By April 1944 training was complete and the squadron departed Mississippi for the port of embarkation.

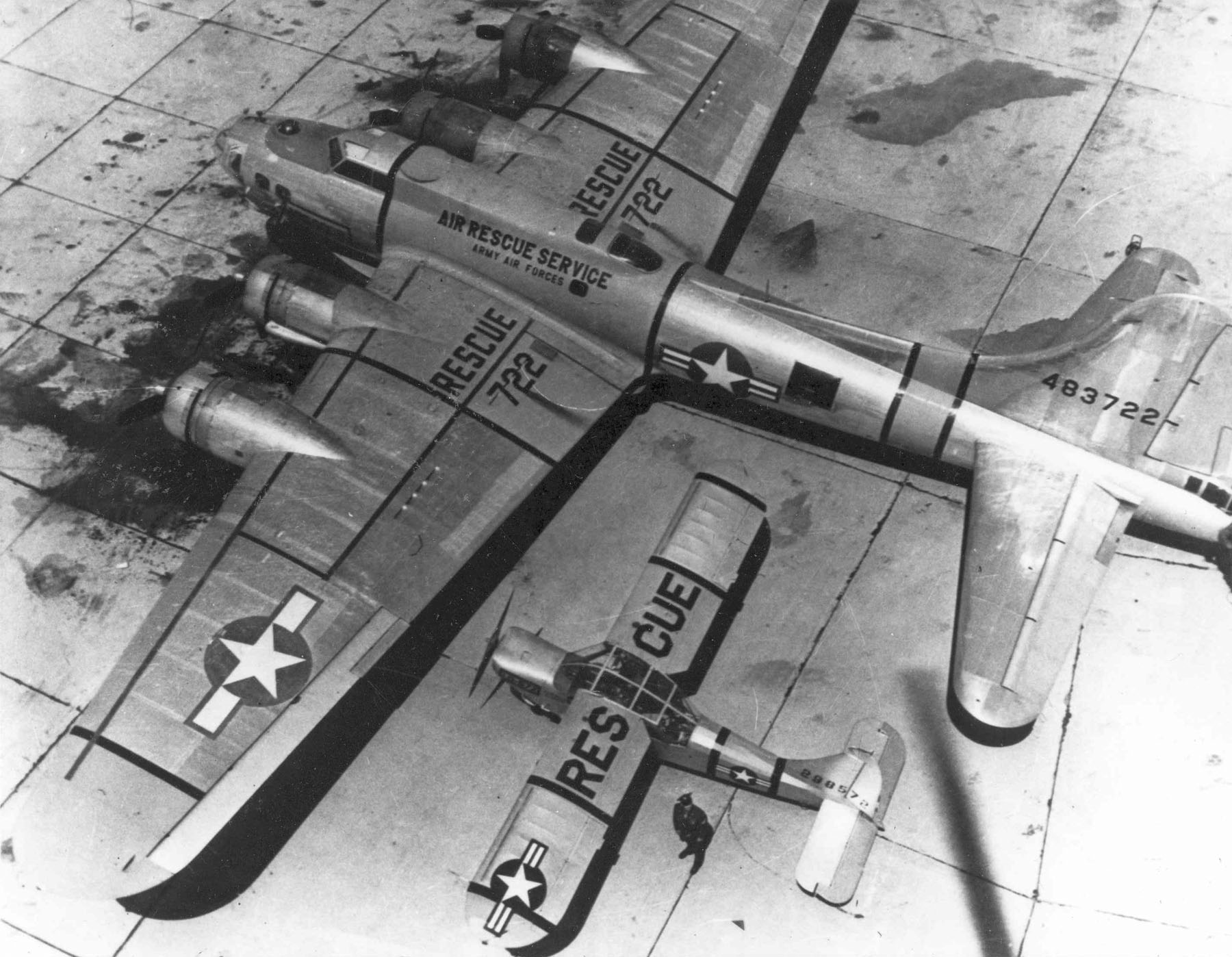
Boeing SB-17G of the 2nd Emergency Rescue Squadron

In late May 1944, the squadron arrived in New Guinea. However, movement of the flight echelon was delayed and it was 17 July before it departed the United States. The first squadron aircraft arrived in New Guinea on 22 July and the first mission was flown on the 27th, rescuing five crewmembers of a downed Consolidated B-24 Liberator in Geelvink Bay, New Guinea. Upon the reunion of the flight and ground echelons, the squadron's flights began to disperse to coastal stations in New Guinea. Because there were few OA-10s in the Southwest Pacific Theater, supply shortages in the Army system were frequent, and the squadron was forced to fly aircraft to Australia, where Army Air Forces depots were located, for repairs unless it could obtain parts from the Navy, whose PBY-5A Catalinas were near duplicates of the OA-10A. Later. combat attrition caused some squadron OA-10As to be replaced by PBY-5As.

In late October 1944, Thirteenth Air Force formed the provisional 5320th Rescue Composite Group, combining the squadron with the 15th Emergency Rescue Boat Squadron. The following month, contact was established with guerrilla forces in the Philippines and arrangements were made for cooperating with them to return fliers shot down over the Philippines.

The squadron was awarded its first Distinguished Unit Citation in April 1945 for conducting extensive search and evacuation missions in adverse weather in their vulnerable and lightly armed aircraft. Squadron aircrews landed in dangerously heavy seas, often under direct enemy shore fire, to pick up flyers in distress. The squadron also established a station at Labo, Camarines Norte, Mindanao behind enemy lines, from which it furnished gasoline, arms and ammunition, food and medical supplies to Philippine guerrilla forces. The squadron's ground echelon kept the unit's aircraft in operational condition, despite frequent damage from enemy action and water landings and take-offs. During this period the squadron performed seven open sea rescues, saving 23 lives, while also evacuating 53 men from enemy territory.

In June 1945, the 2nd received its second operational type when two Boeing SB-17 Dumbos were added to its strength. Although these planes could not make water landings to rescue crews, they were equipped with Higgins boats, which they could drop near downed crews.

=== Post-war service in the Pacific ===
Following the end of the war, the squadron served as part of the occupation forces at Kadena Air Base, Okinawa until 1950. In May 1950 the squadron, now designated the 2nd Rescue Squadron, moved to Clark Air Base in the Philippines. Although the squadron was assigned to Air Rescue Service from May 1949, operational control of its two flights at Clark was still vested in Thirteenth Air Force, while Fifth Air Force controlled its flights at Kadena. (Note: This was the flight attachment at the time they were replaced by squadrons. Earlier, A Flight was attached to 1st Air Division, B Flight to 7th Air Force, and C Flight to Thirteenth Air Force. Abstract, History 2 Rescue Squadron May-Jun 1959, Air Force History Index. Retrieved 10 May 2015.)

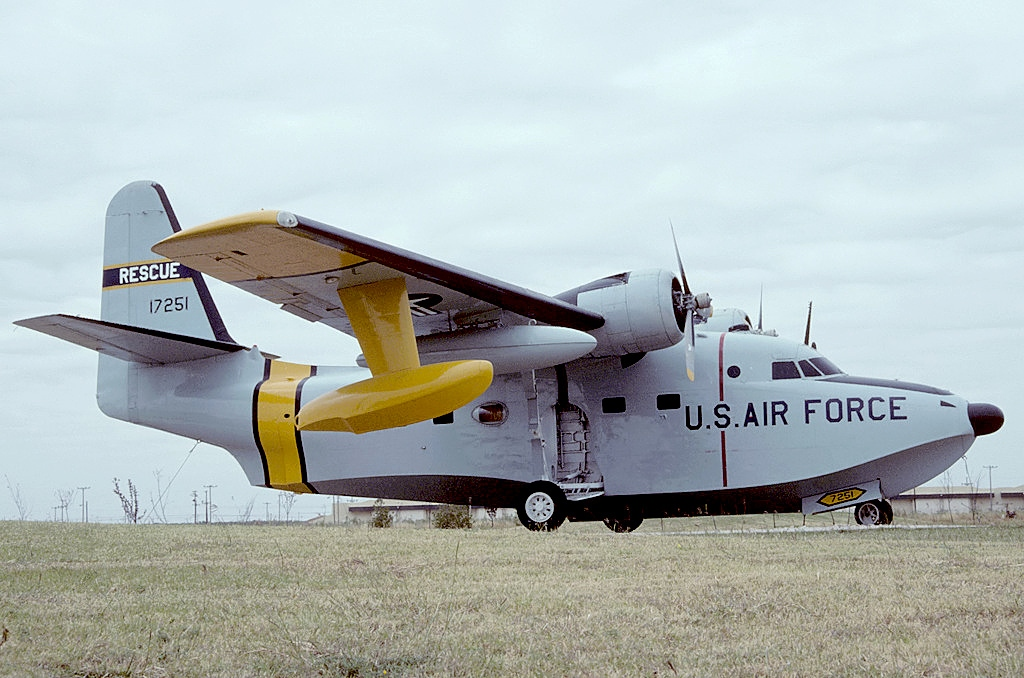
SA-16B Albatross

Although combat search and rescue during the Korean War was the responsibility of the 3rd Air Rescue Squadron, the 2nd Air Rescue Squadron was tasked with providing escort coverage with its SB-29s for bombers based in Okinawa striking targets in North Korea. When the bombers entered enemy territory, the squadron aircraft would orbit just off the enemy coast. The unit also dispatched SB-17 Dumbos to orbit offshore while Boeing RB-29 Superfortress aircraft flying reconnaissance missions over China were over hostile territory. The squadron frequently provided similar precautionary coverage for fighter aircraft making overwater flights.

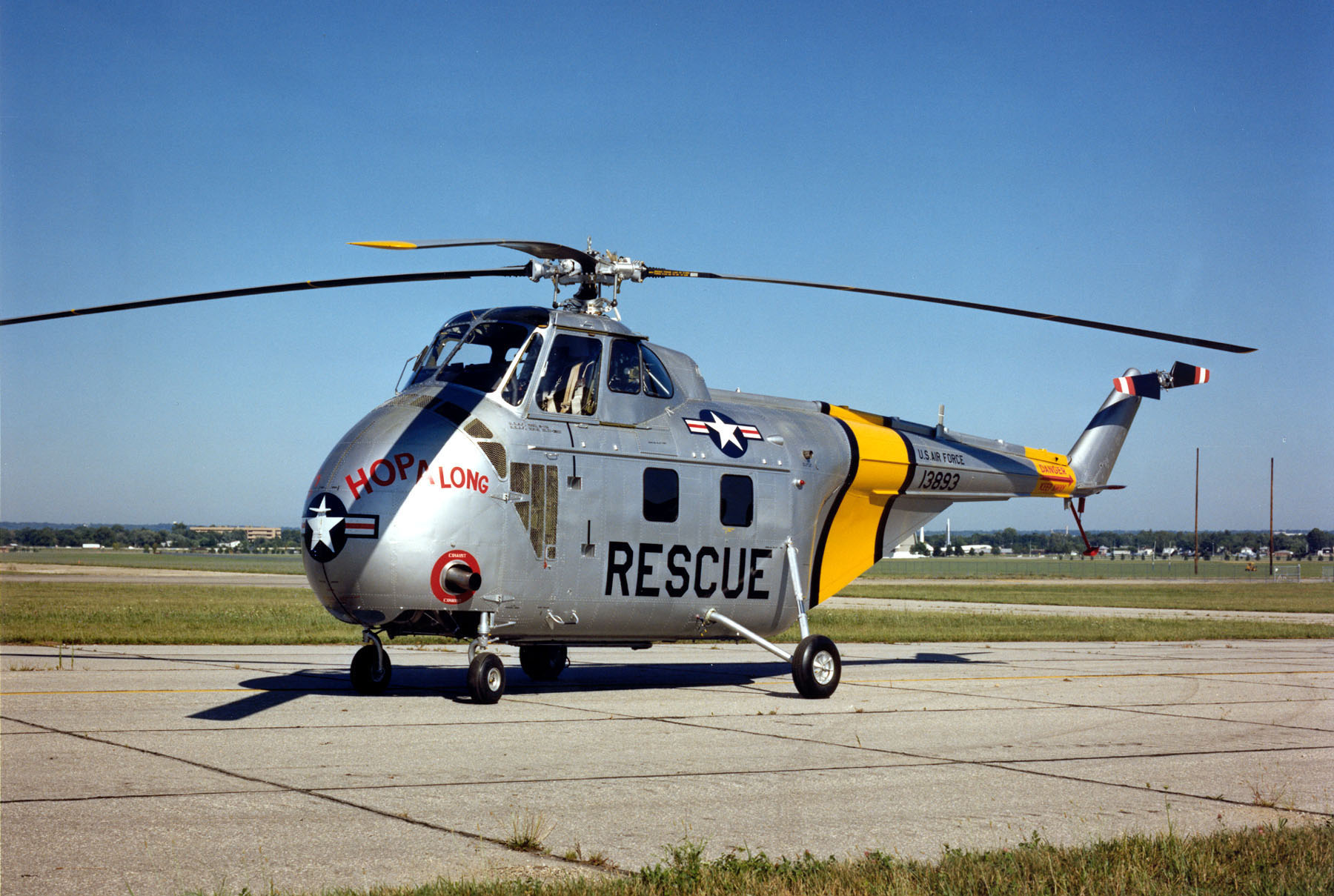
Air Rescue Service SH-19

In 1952, the unit was expanded to group level as the 2nd Air Rescue Group and its lettered flights became air rescue squadrons. A and B Flights at Clark were replaced by the 31st and 32nd Air Rescue Squadrons, while C and D Flights at Kadena transferred their mission, personnel and equipment to the 33rd and 34th Air Rescue Squadrons. The group provided rescue support for units of Thirteenth Air Force and the southwest Pacific until 1955, when it moved to Wheeler Air Force Base. With the move, the 33rd Squadron, now at Naha Air Base, was transferred to the 3rd Air Rescue Group (which now controlled all rescue units in Fifth Air Force's area) and the 2nd Group gained the 76th Air Rescue Squadron in Hawaii. The move made the 2nd the highest command level for Air Force rescue units in the Pacific.

In June 1957, when the 3rd Air Rescue Group in Japan was inactivated, the 38th and 39th Air Rescue Squadrons at Misawa and Ashiya Air Bases were reassigned to the group, giving it direct responsibility for all rescue squadrons in Pacific Air Forces' area of responsibility. The 38th Squadron was inactivated three months after it was assigned to the group and the 39th Squadron assumed responsibility for the 38th's area. Two months later, the 39th was inactivated as well and it was determined that the 2nd, along with other rescue groups, would be inactivated before the end of Fiscal Year 1958. For its remaining months as an active unit, the group focused on the changes required to make its squadrons self-sufficient. The group was inactivated at Wheeler in June 1958 and its component squadrons were assigned directly to Air Rescue Service.

=== Strategic missile support ===
Media related to 582d Helicopter Group (United States Air Force) at Wikimedia Commons

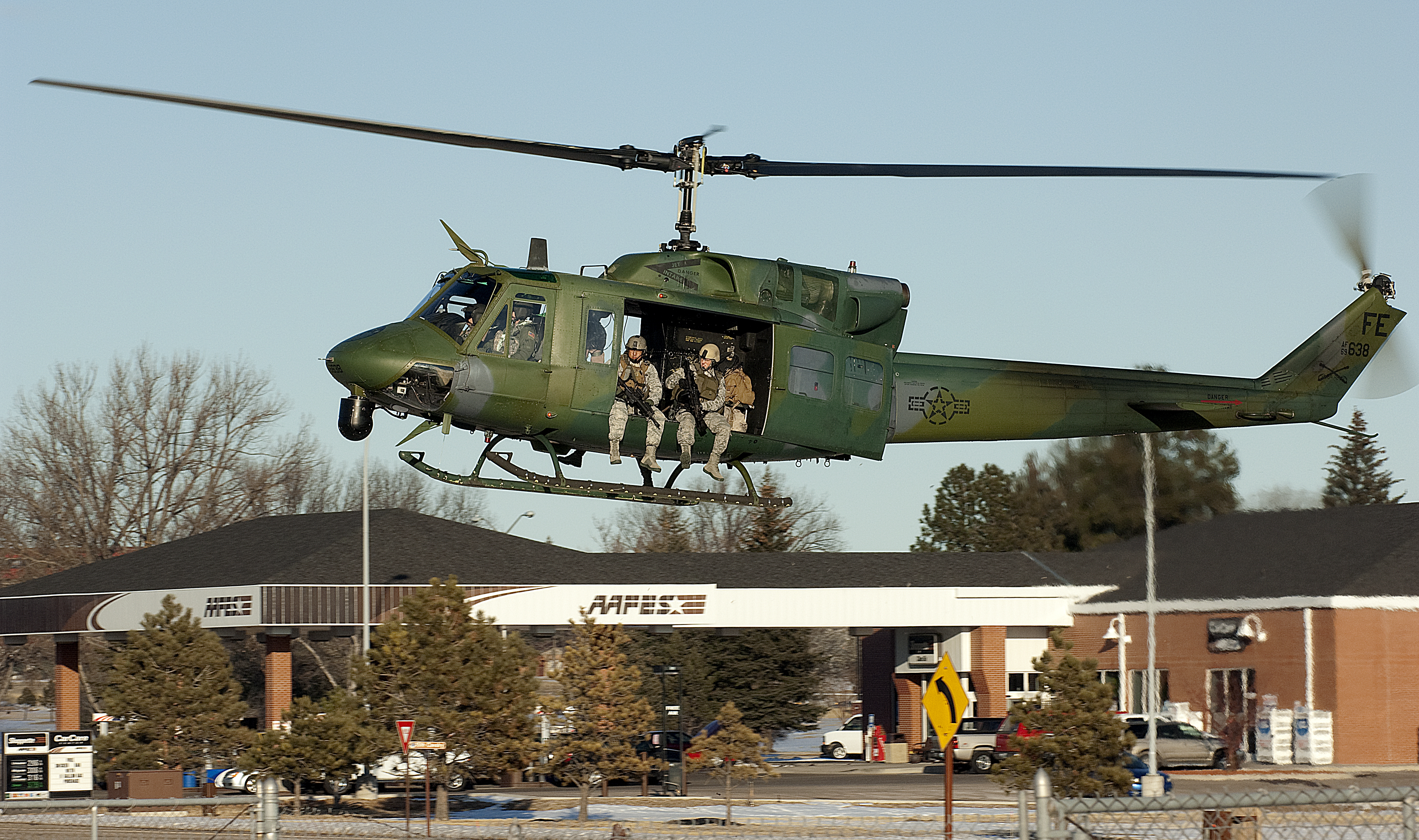
37th Helicopter Squadron Bell UH-1N at F. E. Warren AFB

On 1 August 2014, the 20th Air Force Helicopter Operations Group (Provisional) stood up at F. E. Warren Air Force Base, Wyoming to support the three USAF intercontinental ballistic missile wings. Prior to the activation of the provisional group, helicopter units supporting Minuteman missile wings were assigned to the missile wing's operations group; the 37th Helicopter Squadron at F. E. Warren to the 90th Operations Group, the 40th Helicopter Squadron at Malmstrom Air Force Base, Montana to the 341st Operations Group, and the 54th Helicopter Squadron at Minot Air Force Base, North Dakota to the 91st Operations Group. The formation of the group followed a recommendation from the Air Force Global Strike Command Force Improvement Program. It created an aviation-focused headquarters to support the missile mission for the first time. One hoped-for side effect was to improve morale in the helicopter crews that have been performing the nuclear support mission with the Bell UH-1 Huey since 1969. UH-1s would be used for by missile support units for the foreseeable future due to the cancellation of the Common Vertical Lift Support Platform in 2013.

In 2015, the 2nd Group was redesignated to its current name and activated at F. E. Warren, and the 37th, 40th, and 54th Helicopter Squadrons were relieved of attachment to the provisional group and became the new group's first units.

In 2024 new helicopters began arriving at last, Italian Leonardo AW139 aircraft license-built by Boeing as the Boeing MH-139A Grey Wolf.

== Lineage ==
- Constituted as the 2nd Emergency Rescue Squadron and activated on 15 December 1943

Redesignated 2nd Rescue Squadron on 15 March 1948
Redesignated 2nd Air Rescue Squadron on 10 August 1950
Redesignated 2nd Air Rescue Group on 14 November 1952
Inactivated on 24 June 1958

- Redesignated 582nd Helicopter Group on 11 December 2014

Activated on 6 January 2015

=== Assignments ===
- Fourth Air Force: 15 December 1943
- AAF Eastern Technical Training Command: 4 March 1944 (Note: Bailey's Lineage & Honors statement says AAF Eastern Flying Training Command, but the rescue school at Gulfport and Keesler was assigned to the Technical Training Command.)
- Army Air Forces, Southwest Pacific Area: 10 June 1944
- V Bomber Command, 5 September 1944
- Thirteenth Air Force: 7 October 1944 (attached to 5230th Rescue Composite Group after 31 October 1944)
- 13th Emergency Rescue Group: 16 March 1945
- Thirteenth Air Force: c. 1 October 1945
- 301st Fighter Wing: 30 March 1947 (attached to 316th Bombardment Wing after 10 August 1947)
- Thirteenth Air Force: February 1948 (attached to 316th Bombardment Wing)
- 316th Bombardment Wing: 1 March 1948 (Note: Bailey's Lineage & Honors statement indicates the assignment to the 316th Wing continued until 1949. However, that wing was inactivated in 1948, so the assignment terminated. Maurer, p. 424.)
- 32nd Composite Wing: 18 August 1948
- Air Rescue Service: 1 May 1949 - 24 June 1958 (attached to Thirteenth Air Force November 1952 - November 1955, Pacific Air Forces thereafter)
- Twentieth Air Force, 6 January 2015

=== Components ===
1952-1958

- 31st Air Rescue Squadron, 14 November 1952 – 24 June 1958 (Note: Components stationed with group headquarters, except as noted.)
- 32nd Air Rescue Squadron, 14 November 1952 – 8 September 1954
- 33rd Air Rescue Squadron, 14 November 1952 – 20 September 1955

Kadena Air Base, Okinawa until April 1955, then Naha Air Base, Okinawa

- 34th Air Rescue Squadron, 14 November 1952 – 8 September 1954

Kadena Air Base, Okinawa

- 38th Air Rescue Squadron, 18 June - 18 September 1957

Misawa Air Base, Japan

- 39th Air Rescue Squadron, 18 June - 24 November 1957

Ashiya Air Base, Japan

- 76th Air Rescue Squadron, 20 September 1955 – 24 June 1958

Hickam Air Force Base, Hawaii

- 79th Air Rescue Squadron 16 February 1954 - 24 June 1958

Andersen Air Force Base, Guam

2015 and later

- 37th Helicopter Squadron, 15 January 2015 – present
- 40th Helicopter Squadron, 15 January 2015 – present

Malmstrom Air Force Base, Montana

- 54th Helicopter Squadron, 15 January 2015 – present
- 550th Helicopter Squadron, May 2024 – present

Malmstrom Air Force Base, Montana

- 582nd Operations Support Squadron, 6 January 2015 – present

=== Stations ===
- Hamilton Field, California 15 December 1943
- Gulfport Army Air Field, Mississippi, 12 February 1944
- Keesler Field, Mississippi, 1 April 1944
- Camp Stoneman, California, 20 – 30 April 1944
- Oro Bay, New Guinea, 29 May 1944
- Mokmer Airport, Biak, New Guinea, 5 September 1944
- Sorido Airport, Biak, New Guinea, October 1944
- Morotai, 10 October 1944
- Clark Field, Luzon, Philippines, 16 September 1945
- Kadena Field (later Kadena Air Force Base), Okinawa, 31 March 1947
- Clark Air Base, Luzon, Philippines, 4 May 1950
- Wheeler Air Force Base, Hawaii, 7 November 1955 - 24 June 1958
- F. E. Warren Air Force Base, Wyoming, 15 January 2015 – present

=== Aircraft ===
- Consolidated OA-10A Catalina, 1944-unknown
- Douglas C-47 Skytrain, 1945-unknown
- Boeing SB-17G Dumbo, 1945-Korean war era
- Boeing SB-29 Superdumbo, Korean war era
- Grumman SA-16 Albatross, by 1951-1957
- Sikorsky SH-19, 1956-1957
- Bell UH-1N Twin Huey, 2015 - present
- Boeing MH-139A Grey Wolf, 2024 – present.

=== Awards and campaigns ===
| Award streamer | Award | Dates | Notes |
|---|---|---|---|
| | Distinguished Unit Citation | 1 April 1945-15 April 1945 | Celebes and Molucca Islands, 2nd Emergency Rescue Squadron |
| | Distinguished Unit Citation | 12 June-4 July 1945 | Southwest Pacific, 2nd Emergency Rescue Squadron |
| | Philippine Republic Presidential Unit Citation | 10 October 1944-4 July 1945 | 2nd Emergency Rescue Squadron |

| Campaign Streamer | Campaign | Dates | Notes |
|---|---|---|---|
| | New Guinea | May 1944-31 December 1944 | 2nd Emergency Rescue Squadron |
| | Leyte | 17 October 1944 – 1 July 1945 | 2nd Emergency Rescue Squadron |
| | Luzon | 15 December 1944 – 4 July 1945 | 2nd Emergency Rescue Squadron |
| | Southern Philippines | 27 February 1945 – 4 July 1945 | 2nd Emergency Rescue Squadron |
| | World War II Army of Occupation (Japan) | 31 March 1947 – 4 May 1950 | 2nd Emergency Rescue Squadron (later 2nd Rescue Squadron) |

== See also ==
- List of United States Air Force Groups
- List of United States Air Force rescue squadrons
- List of Consolidated PBY Catalina operators
- B-17 Flying Fortress units of the United States Army Air Forces
- List of C-47 Skytrain operators
- List of Bell UH-1 Iroquois operators
