= 54th Helicopter Squadron =

US Air Force helicopter unit

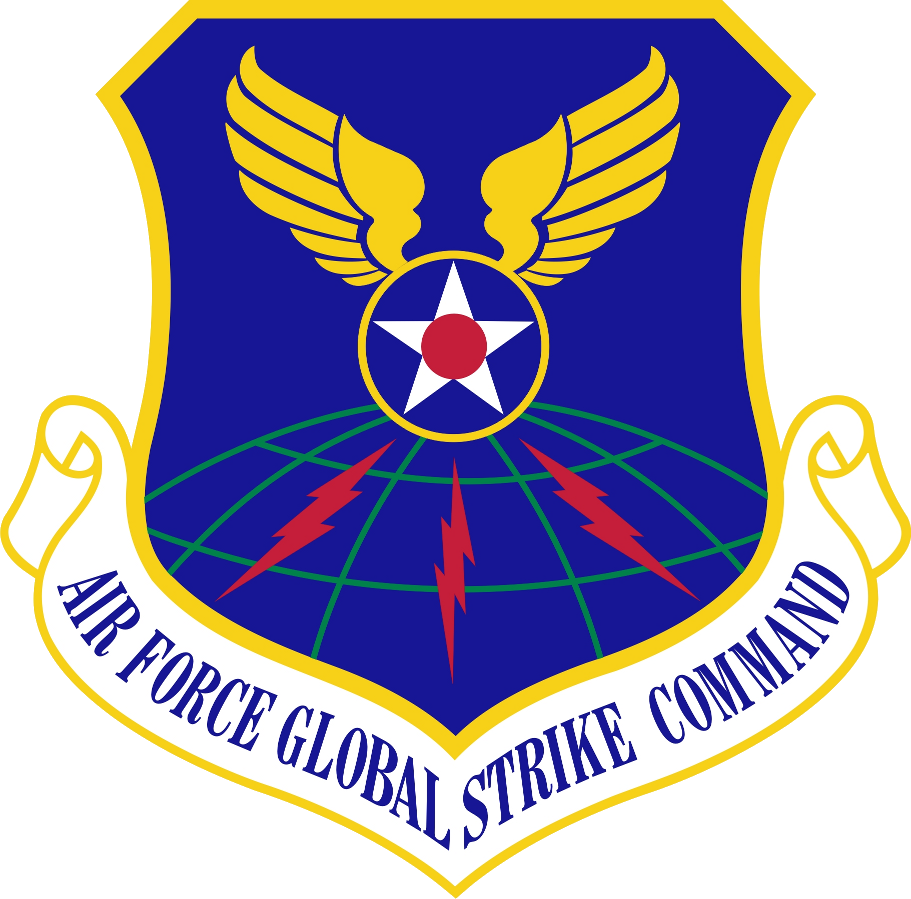
54th Helicopter Squadron

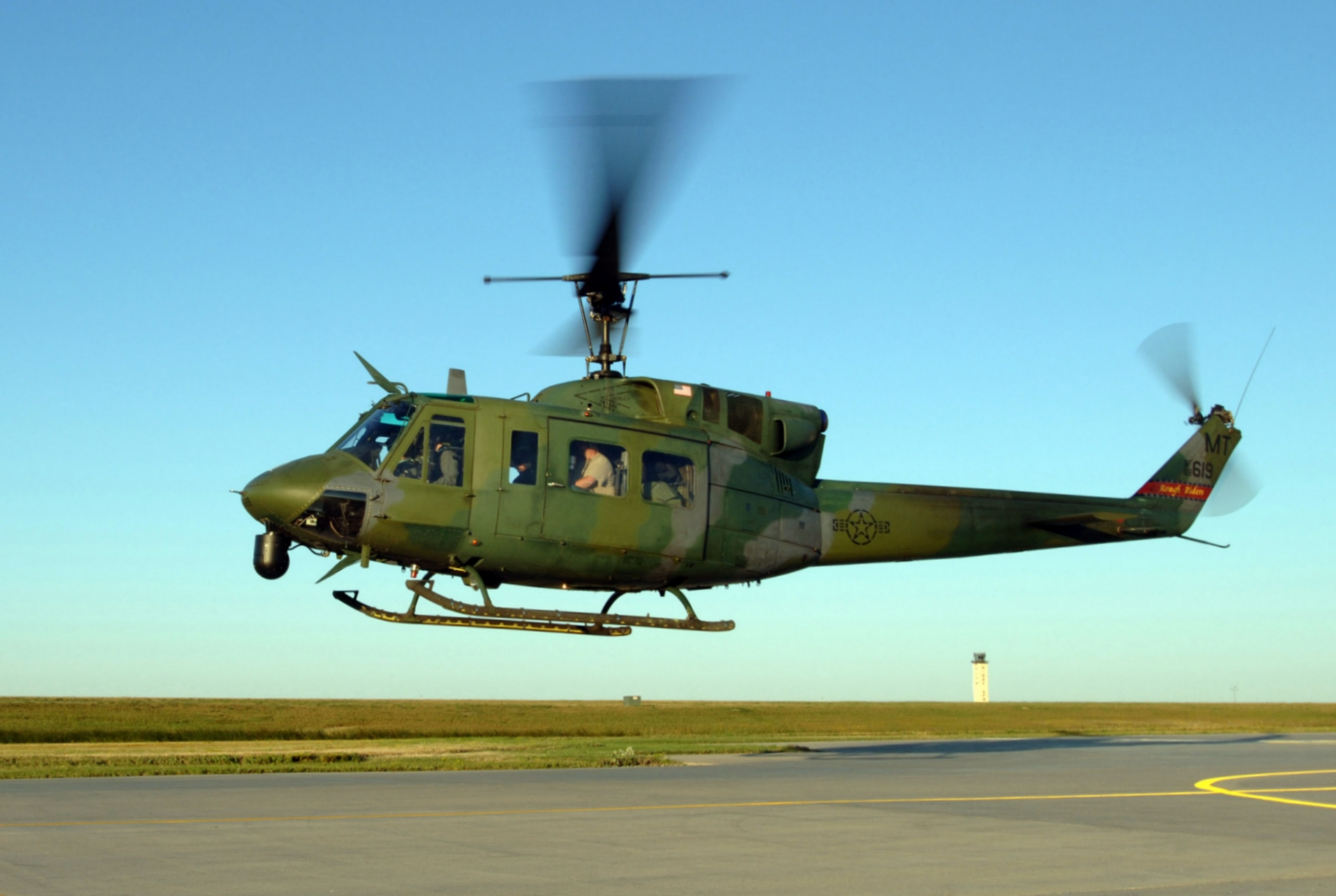
- A helicopter of the 54th takes off at Minot en route to Columbus Air Force Base in 2005
- Active: 1952–1960; 1961–1974; 1993–present
- Country: United States
- Branch: United States Air Force
- Role: Missile support
- Part of: Air Force Global Strike Command
- Garrison/HQ: Minot Air Force Base
- Motto: Wings of Mercy (1956–1974)
- Decorations: Navy Meritorious Unit Commendation; Air Force Outstanding Unit Award

Commanders
- Current commander: Lt Col Jared P. Hann

Insignia
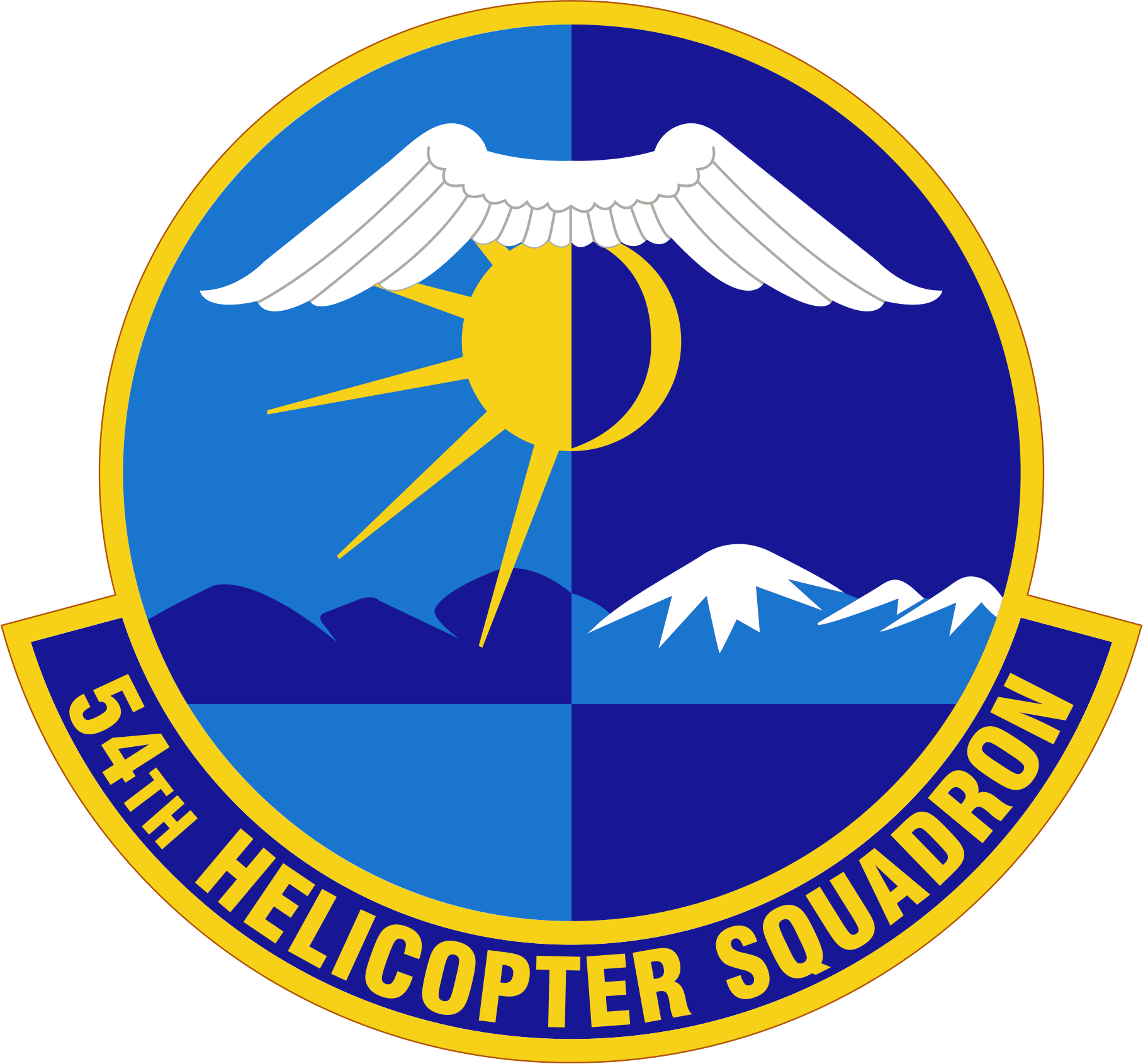
- 54th Helicopter Squadron emblem

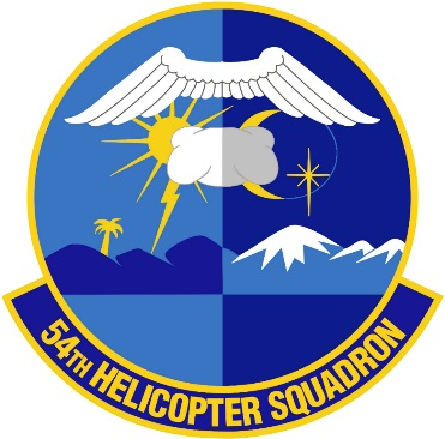
- Previous emblem for the 54th Helicopter Squadron

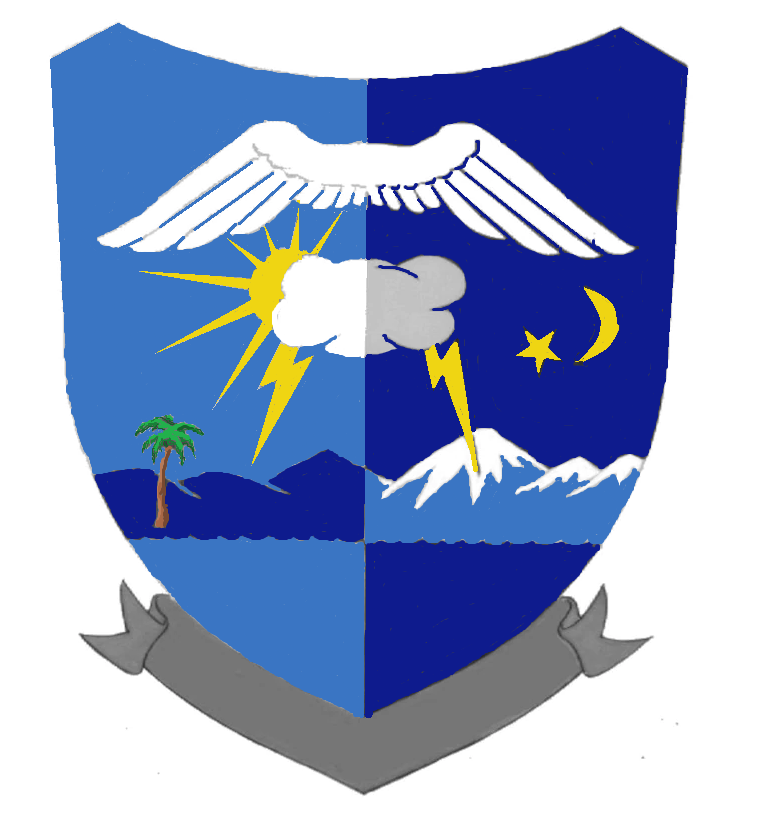
- 54th Air Rescue Squadron emblem (Note: Approved 7 July 1956.)

The 54th Helicopter Squadron is a unit of the United States Air Force based at Minot Air Force Base in North Dakota. It is currently part of the 582d Helicopter Group, headquartered at F. E. Warren Air Force Base, Wyoming. Since it was first created, it has served a search and rescue and transport function at Air Force bases in three locations in North America. In its most recent format (since 1993), it has been stationed at Minot Air Force Base.

== History ==
=== Search and rescue ===
The squadron was first activated in November 1952 as the 54th Air Rescue Squadron at Goose Bay Airport, Labrador, when Air Rescue Service expanded its squadrons into groups. At Goose, the new squadron assumed the personnel, equipment and mission of Flight D, 6th Air Rescue Squadron, which was simultaneously discontinued. The squadron performed search and rescue missions in Labrador and Greenland and the surrounding waters. The squadron was briefly inactivated in June 1960, but was restored to active duty at Goose the following June.

The squadron was renamed the 54th Recovery Squadron in July 1965 to reflect its additional mission of recovering capsules ejected by various reconnaissance platforms. Little more than six months later, along with all rescue and recovery units, it was renamed the 54th Aerospace Rescue and Recovery Squadron. In 1967, the squadron moved to Pease Air Force Base, New Hampshire, where it continued the same mission until inactivating in June 1974.

=== Missile support ===
The squadron was reactivated in 1993 as the 54th Rescue Flight, It provided security for the 91st Missile Wing's missile complex. It also transported security forces and equipment throughout the wing's missile fields and supported medical evacuation and rescue searches.

== Lineage ==
- Constituted as the 54th Air Rescue Squadron on 17 October 1952

Activated on 14 November 1952
Inactivated on 18 June 1960
Activated on 18 June 1961
Redesignated 54th Air Recovery Squadron on 1 July 1965
Redesignated 54th Aerospace Rescue and Recovery Squadron on 8 January 1966
Inactivated on 1 July 1974
Redesignated 54th Rescue Flight
Activated on 1 May 1993
Redesignated 54th Helicopter Flight on 1 May 1998
Redesignated 54th Helicopter Squadron on 8 October 2005

=== Assignments ===
- 6th Air Rescue Group, 14 Nov 1952
- Air Rescue Service, 18 February 1958 – 18 June 1960
- Military Air Transport Service, 10 May 1961 (not organized)
- Air Rescue Service (later Aerospace Rescue and Recovery Service), 18 June 1961
- 39th Aerospace Rescue and Recovery Wing, 1 January 1970 - 15 July 1974
- 91st Operations Group, 1 May 1993
- 91st Missile Group, 1 Jul 1994
- 91st Operations Group, 1 Feb 1996 - 5 January 2015 (attached to Twentieth Air Force Helicopter Operations Group after August 2014)
- 582d Helicopter Group: 5 January 2015 – present

=== Stations ===
- Goose Bay Airport (later Goose Air Base), Newfoundland and Labrador, Canada, 14 November 1952 - 18 Jun 1960
- Goose Air Base, Canada, 18 June 1961
- Pease Air Force Base, New Hampshire, 1 August 1967 - 15 July 1974
- Minot Air Force Base, North Dakota 1 May 1993 – present

== Aircraft ==
- Grumman SA-16 Albatross (later HU-16), 1952–1957, 1961-1963
- Boeing SB-17 Dumbo, 1952-1953
- Douglas SC-47 Skytrain, 1952–1955;
- Sikorsky H-5, 1952-1954
- Sikorsky H-19, 1955-1956
- Sikorsky SH-19 (later HH-19), 1961-1963
- Piaseki SH-21B Work Horse, 1956–1960, 1961-1962
- Douglas SC-54 Skymaster (later HC-54), 1957–1960, 1961-1966
- Kamen SH- 43 (later HH-43Husky), 1961-1967
- Lockheed HC-130 Hercules, 1966-1974
- Sikorsky HH-3, 1972-1973
- Bell UH-1 Huey, 1993
- Bell HH-1 Huey, 1993
- Bell UH-1N Huey, 1996–present
