= 908th Flying Training Wing =

908th Flying Training Wing (formerly Airlift Wing)

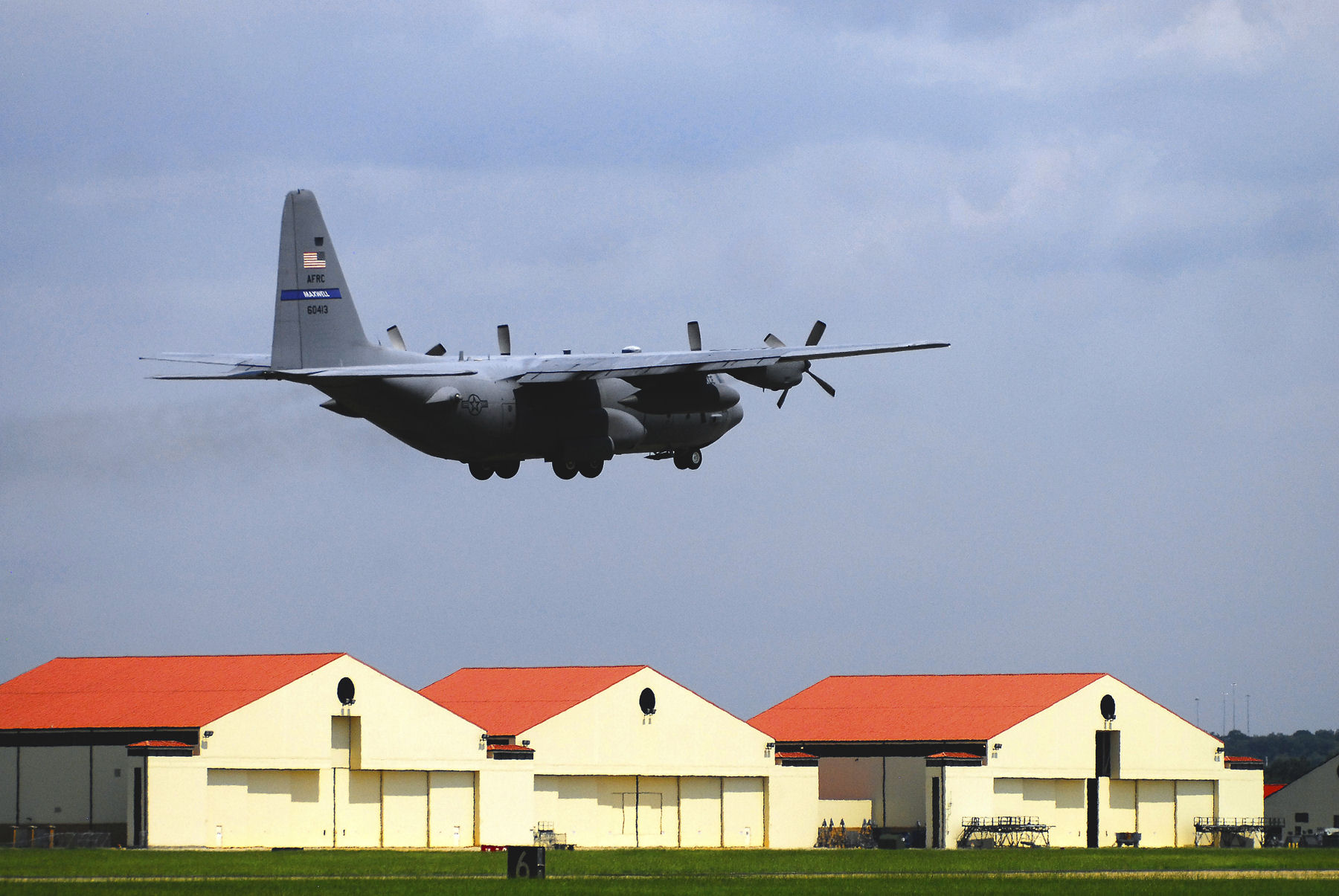
- A wing C-130 Hercules takes off from Maxwell AFB with the wing's hangars in the background
- Active: 1963-present
- Country: United States
- Branch: United States Air Force
- Role: Formal Training Unit
- Part of: Air Force Reserve Command
- Garrison/HQ: Maxwell Air Force Base
- Engagements: Operation Enduring Freedom; Operation Iraqi Freedom
- Decorations: Air Force Outstanding Unit Award

Commanders
- Current commander: Colonel Shane M. Devlin
- Vice Commander: Colonel Michael D. Bennett
- Command Chief: Chief Master Sergeant Tracy D. Cornett

Insignia
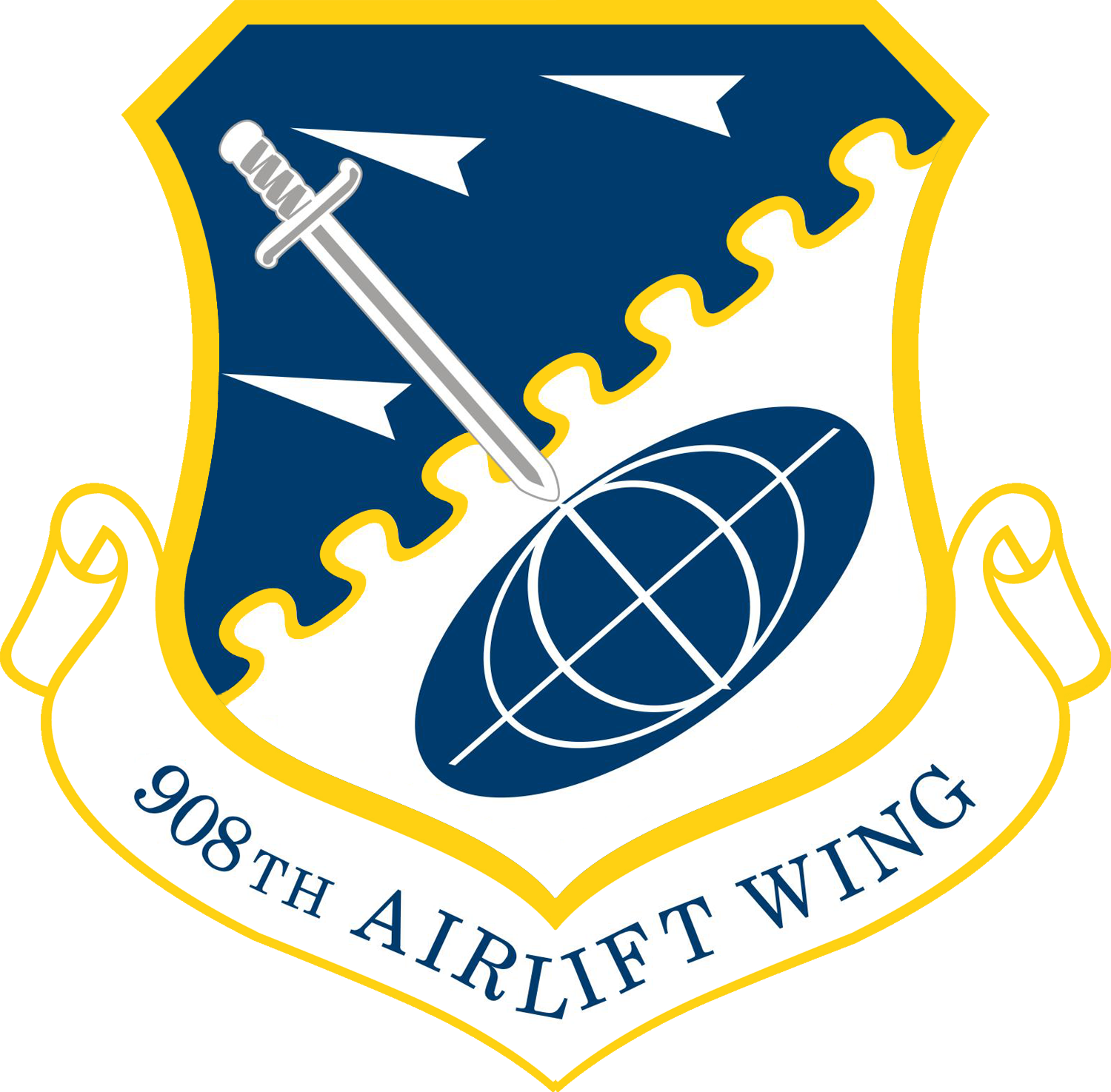
- 908th Airlift Wing emblem (approved 20 April 1976)

Aircraft flown
- Multirole helicopter: Boeing MH-139A Grey Wolf

The 908th Flying Training Wing is the Boeing MH-139A Grey Wolf Formal Training Unit assigned to the Air Force Reserve Command. It was formerly a Lockheed C-130H Hercules theater airlift unit. The wing is stationed at Maxwell Air Force Base, Alabama.

908th Flying Training Wing's mission is to recruit, organize and train Air Force reservists for active duty in time of war, national emergency or when otherwise required. When mobilized, the mission of the 908th Airlift Wing is to provide theater airlift forces to the supported theater commander.

== Units ==
The 908th Airlift Wing consists of the following major units:

- 908th Operations Group

703d Helicopter Squadron
908th Aeromedical Evacuation Squadron
908th Operations Support Squadron

- 908th Maintenance Group

908th Aircraft Maintenance Squadron
908th Maintenance Squadron
908th Maintenance Operations Flight

- 908th Mission Support Group

25th Aerial Port Squadron
908th Civil Engineering Squadron
908th Logistics Readiness Squadron
908th Force Support Squadron
908th Security Forces Squadron

- 908th Aeromedical Staging Squadron

== Mission ==
The 908th Flying Training Wing is the Boeing MH-139A Grey Wolf Formal Training Unit

== History ==
=== Need for reserve troop carrier groups ===
During the first half of 1955, the Air Force began detaching Air Force Reserve squadrons from their parent wing locations to separate sites. The concept offered several advantages. Communities were more likely to accept the smaller squadrons than the large wings and the location of separate squadrons in smaller population centers would facilitate recruiting and manning. Continental Air Command (ConAC)'s plan called for placing Air Force Reserve units at fifty-nine installations located throughout the United States. When these relocations were completed in 1959, reserve wing headquarters and wing support elements would typically be on one base, along with one (or in some cases two) of the wing's flying squadrons, while the remaining flying squadrons were spread over thirty-five Air Force, Navy and civilian airfields under what was called the Detached Squadron Concept.

Although this dispersal was not a problem when the entire wing was called to active service, mobilizing a single flying squadron and elements to support it proved difficult. This weakness was demonstrated in the partial mobilization of reserve units during the Berlin Crisis of 1961 To resolve this, at the start of 1962, ConAC determined to reorganize its reserve wings by establishing groups with support elements for each of its troop carrier squadrons. This reorganization would facilitate mobilization of elements of wings in various combinations when needed. However, as this plan was entering its implementation phase, another partial mobilization occurred for the Cuban Missile Crisis, with the units being released on 22 November 1962. The formation of troop carrier groups occurred in January 1963 for units that had not been mobilized, but was delayed until February for those that had been.

=== Activation of 908th Troop Carrier Group ===
As a result, the 908th Troop Carrier Group was established at Bates Field, Alabama on 11 February 1963, as the headquarters for the 357th Troop Carrier Squadron, which had been stationed there since May 1961. Along with group headquarters, a Combat Support Squadron, Materiel Squadron and a Tactical Infirmary were organized to support the 357th.

The group's mission was to organize, recruit and train Air Force Reserve personnel in the tactical airlift of airborne forces, their equipment and supplies and delivery of these forces and materials by airdrop, landing or cargo extraction systems. The group was equipped with Fairchild C-119 Flying Boxcars for Tactical Air Command airlift operations.

In October 1964, the unit moved to Brookley Air Force Base also in Mobile. There, the 908th built a substantial record of humanitarian airlifts, as well as taking care of regular cargo and mail missions to free Military Airlift Command aircraft committed to Southeast Asia.

On 16 July 1966, a 908th C-119 crashed near Jacksonville, Florida, after losing an engine in a fire. The four crewmen and all 30 Florida National Guard members on board bailed out safely, thanks to the pilot, Maj Robert C. Coyle of Biloxi, Mississippi. Before ditching the aircraft, Major Coyle saw to it that every passenger and his three crewmen had jumped. For his heroism, he was awarded the Distinguished Flying Cross and the Florida Cross.

In February 1969, another move was announced. The 908th would move to Maxwell Air Force Base, Montgomery, Alabama, the following spring and fly the small, twin-engine Cessna U-3 Blue Canoe, a forward control aircraft.

The 800-member unit dropped down to a mere 275 people. However, another change was planned: to switch from the U-3H to the Cessna O-2 Skymaster, another twin-engine forward air control aircraft.

A year after the March 1970 conversion to O-2As, word arrived that the unit would convert to Cessna A-37 Dragonfly jets. Amid plans for receiving the jets, there was yet another change: the 908th would return to the airlift business flying the de Havilland Canada C-7 Caribou, a twin-engine utility transport. In December 1971, the 908th was redesignated the 908th Tactical Airlift Group, and the first "Bou" came on board in March 1972.

The 908 TAG was declared combat ready in February 1973, the first C-7 unit in the Air Force Reserve to achieve that status. In its nearly 10 years in the C-7, the 908th won three Air Force Outstanding Unit Awards and dozens of other unit and individual honors.

In October 1983, the 908th converted to Lockheed C-130 Hercules aircraft in its C-130E version. Less than three years later, in June 1986, the unit began receiving new C-130Hs. The transition to the new aircraft culminated in May 1987 at the International Airlift Rodeo competition at Pope Air Force Base, N.C., where the 908th placed as first overall C-130 unit in the world, and fourth place overall among all aircraft competing. This winning tradition continued in 2000 with the 908th winning best C-130/C-160 airdrop aircrew.

The 908th operated eight Lockheed C-130H Hercules cargo aircraft. It had approximately 1,200 officers and airmen who serve the unit as reservists, normally spending one weekend a month and two weeks of annual tour per year with the unit. The day-to-day operations of the 908th were handled by a group of 175 civil servants known as Air Reserve Technicians, who also served as reservists, and a small number of civilian employees who do not have reserve status. 908th reservists trained and performed airlift missions in support of U.S. humanitarian and peacekeeping efforts worldwide.

In January 1991, medical support personnel from the 908th Medical Squadron and the 35th Aeromedical Evacuation Squadron were activated and deployed in support of Desert Storm. Sixty-two members (doctors, nurses, dentist and lab technicians) of the 908th Medical Squadron were deployed. About 20 members went to Saudi Arabia; the remainder went to Andrews AFB, MD. Members of the 35th Aeromedical Evacuation Squadron (flight nurses and medical technicians) were deployed to the United Kingdom to provide in-flight medical care aboard C-130s and C-141s, to casualties evacuated from the battle zone to hospitals in Europe and CONUS.

In 1992 the 908th Tactical Airlift Group was redesignated the 908th Airlift Group (AG), reporting directly to Tenth Air Force. In 1994, under an Air Force Reserve restructuring, the 908 AG was upgraded to wing status.

Throughout the 1990s the 908 AW supported numerous contingencies, including repeated deployments of volunteers to Europe in support of airlift operations into the former Yugoslavia.

From November 1998 to January 1999, the 908 AW assisted in relief and recovery efforts following Hurricane Mitch in Central America.

Within two days of the September 11, 2001, terrorist attack on the World Trade Center and the Pentagon, 26 908th Security Forces Squadron members were called to active duty primarily augmenting the security forces at Maxwell and Gunter in their heightened security efforts. On 8 November, fifty-two 908th SFS personnel joined the legions of reservists and Guard members called to active duty in support of the homeland defense effort, Operation Noble Eagle.

In 2002, volunteers from the wing's 908th Aeromedical Evacuation Squadron deployed to Afghanistan in support of Operation Enduring Freedom. They were the first group of airmen to deploy to the war from the wing and received numerous awards including the Air Medal, Army Commendation Medal and the Outstanding Unit Award with Valor.

In December 2003, nearly 250 unit personnel from the wing's C-130 operations and maintenance units were called to active duty to fight in the War in Afghanistan (2001-2021), with more than 180 aircrew members and maintenance and support personnel initially deploying to Central Asia. During the mobilization, the units also supported the 2003 invasion of Iraq, deploying to the Persian Gulf region. The units demobilized in November 2005.

=== Mission change ===
The 908th Wing is the preferred location to host the Air Force's Boeing MH-139A Grey Wolf formal training unit, according to an announcement made by the Secretary of the Air Force on 20 November 2020. The final decision is expected in 2021 following an environmental impact statement. The wing mission will be to train pilots in providing security and support for Air Force intercontinental ballistic missile fields. The MH-139 mission will replace the mission of the wing's aging C-130Hs, with the first MH-139s arriving in 2023.

The first MH-139A Grey Wolf arrived on April 3, 2024.

== Lineage ==
- Established as the 908th Troop Carrier Group, Medium and activated on 15 January 1963 (not organized)

Organized in the Reserve on 11 February 1963
Redesignated 908th Tactical Airlift Group on 1 July 1967
Redesignated 908th Tactical Air Support Group on 25 April 1969
Redesignated 908th Tactical Airlift Group on 15 December 1971
Redesignated 908th Airlift Group on 1 February 1992
Redesignated 908th Airlift Wing on 1 October 1994
Redesignated 908th Flying Training Wing 20 July 2024

=== Assignments ===
- Continental Air Command, 15 January 1963 (not organized)
- 302d Troop Carrier Wing, 11 February 1963
- 435th Troop Carrier Wing, 18 March 1963
- 446th Troop Carrier Wing (later 446th Tactical Airlift Wing), 1 December 1965
- 433d Tactical Airlift Wing, 1 March 1968
- Third Air Force Reserve Region, 25 April 1969
- Eastern Air Force Reserve Region, 31 December 1969
- 434th Special Operations Wing, 1 July 1971
- 302d Tactical Airlift Wing, 25 October 1971
- 94th Tactical Airlift Wing (later 94th Airlift Wing), 1 July 1972
- 403d Airlift Wing (later 403d Wing), 1 August 1992
- Tenth Air Force, 1 October 1994
- Twenty-Second Air Force, 1 April 1997 – present

=== Components ===
- 908th Operations Group: 1 August 1992 – present
- 357th Troop Carrier Squadron (later 357th Tactical Airlift Squadron, 357th Tactical Air Support Squadron, 357th Tactical Airlift Squadron, 357th Airlift Squadron): 11 February 1963 - 1 August 1992

=== Stations ===
- Bates Field, Alabama, 11 February 1963
- Brookley Air Force Base, Alabama, 1 October 1964
- Maxwell Air Force Base, Alabama, 25 April 1969 – present

=== Aircraft ===
- Fairchild C-119 Flying Boxcar, 1963–1969
- Cessna U-3 Blue Canoe, 1969–1971
- Cessna O-2 Skymaster, 1970–1971
- de Havilland Canada C-7 Caribou, 1971–1983
- Lockheed C-130 Hercules, 1983–2022
- Boeing MH-139A Grey Wolf, 2024–Present
