= Air Force Global Strike Command =

Major command of the United States Air Force responsible for strategic and nuclear forces

- Shield of Air Force Global Strike Command
- Active: 7 August 2009–present (As Air Force Global Strike Command); 21 March 1946 – 1 June 1992 (as Strategic Air Command); 13 December 1944 – 21 March 1946 (as Continental Air Forces) (81 years, 10 months)
- Country: United States of America
- Branch: United States Air Force (26 September 1947 – 1 June 1992; 7 August 2009–present); United States Army ( Army Air Forces; 15 December 1944 – 26 September 1947)
- Type: Major Command
- Role: "Airmen ALWAYS ready to provide long-range precision strike ... anytime, anywhere!"
- Size: 30,646 Airmen; 178 aircraft 406 ICBMs
- Part of: United States Strategic Command
- Headquarters: Barksdale Air Force Base, Louisiana, U.S.
- Motto: "Always Ready"
- Decorations: Air Force Organization Excellence Award
- Website: www.afgsc.af.mil

Commanders
- Commander: Gen Stephen L. Davis
- Deputy Commander: Lt Gen Jason R. Armagost
- Command Chief: CMSgt Shawn M. Aiello

Aircraft flown
- Bomber: B-1B, B-2A, B-52H
- Electronic warfare: E-4B
- Utility helicopter: UH-1N, MH-139
- Trainer: T-38C
- LGM-30G

The Air Force Global Strike Command (AFGSC) is a major command (MAJCOM) of the United States Air Force, headquartered at Barksdale Air Force Base, Louisiana. AFGSC provides combat-ready forces to conduct strategic nuclear deterrence and global strike operations in support of combatant commanders. Air Force Global Strike Command is the Air Force's service component to the United States Strategic Command (USSTRATCOM).

Air Force Global Strike Command is the direct descendant unit of the Cold War–era Strategic Air Command (SAC). It holds the lineage, history and honors of SAC.

It continues to operate two "legs" of the US nuclear triad, its LGM-30G Minuteman III intercontinental ballistic missiles and B-52H Stratofortress and B-2 Spirit strategic bombers. Alongside the no-longer-nuclear-capable B-1 Lancer, its bombers also participate in conventional attacks. It operates the E-4B Advanced Airborne Command Post, nicknamed the "doomsday plane".

Under US nuclear weapons modernization, it will operate the LGM-35 Sentinel ICBM and the B-21 Raider bomber.

== History ==
See: Strategic Air Command for history prior to 2009

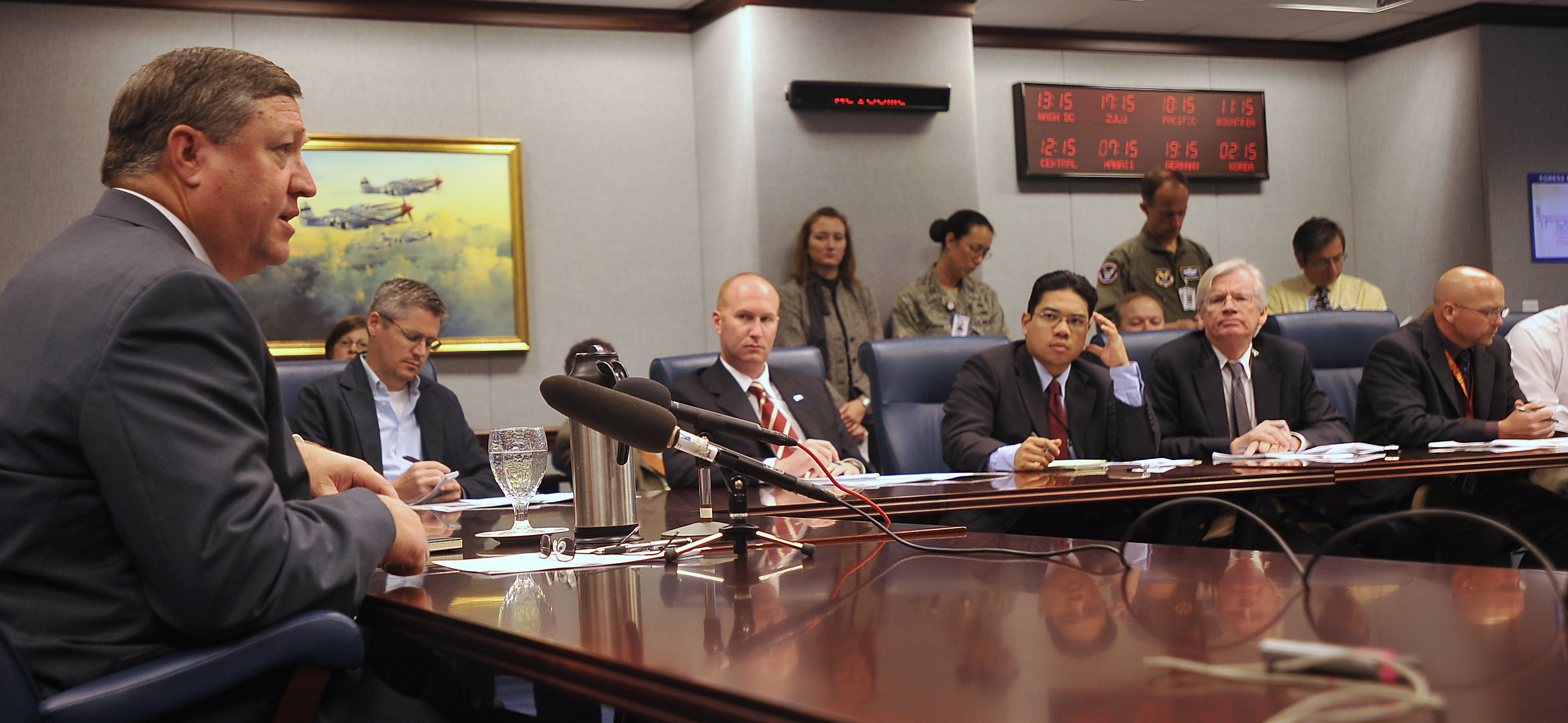
Secretary of the Air Force Michael Donley discusses the creation of the Global Strike Command

Following the 2007 United States Air Force nuclear weapons incident when six AGM-129 Advanced Cruise Missiles (ACM), each loaded with a W80-1 variable yield nuclear warhead, were mistakenly loaded onto a B-52H at Minot AFB and transported to Barksdale AFB, and the 2008 incident in which four MK-12 forward-section reentry vehicle assemblies were mistakenly shipped to Taiwan, former Secretary of Defense James R. Schlesinger led an investigation into the status of U.S. Air Force nuclear security. Secretary Schlesinger's recommendation was the creation of a single major command under which all Air Force nuclear assets should be placed for better accountability. On 24 October 2008, the Secretary of the Air Force, Michael Donley, announced the creation of the Air Force Global Strike Command (AFGSC) as a new Air Force major command (MAJCOM). The AFGSC is the only remaining Air Force component command reporting to the United States Strategic Command (USSTRATCOM) at Offutt.

The new command began operations in August 2009, combining the nuclear-capable strategic bomber force previously operated by Air Combat Command (ACC) and the land-based intercontinental ballistic missile (ICBM) force previously operated by Air Force Space Command (AFSPC). ACC and AFSPC had assumed those responsibilities following the 1992 inactivation of Strategic Air Command (SAC).

The USAF currently has 20 B-2 Spirit, 57 B-52 Stratofortress bombers, and three missile wings of Minuteman III ICBMs that are designated as nuclear-capable. When needed for conventional missions, the B-2 and B-52 bombers are reassigned to regional commands. Although formerly assigned a nuclear mission, the Rockwell B-1 Lancer bomber force transitioned to a strictly conventional mission force. The B-1 was initially retained in Air Combat Command, although that decision was reversed in 2015. The Rockwell B-1 Lancer bombers are now organized under the Air Force Global Strike Command.

In November 2008, the USAF announced plans to start a fourth B-52 squadron at Minot Air Force Base to support Air Force Global Strike Command. The USAF added that, "all the nuclear-capable bombers of what is now Eighth Air Force, and [command of all ICBMs] of what is now in Twentieth Air Force, will report to this single new command.". This action was accomplished on 3 September 2009, when the 69th Bomb Squadron reactivated at Minot Air Force Base.

The command's 55-member preliminary team, commanded by Major General James Kowalski, began operations at Bolling Air Force Base on 12 January 2009. The team was charged with finding a location for the new headquarters, and for transitioning the assigned units into the new command.

In April 2009, the preliminary team selected Barksdale Air Force Base as the headquarters for the new command. Donley stated that the factors which contributed to the selection of Barksdale over the other candidate bases were its connection to the 8th Air Force, a "slightly larger [air] operations center", and the base's hosting of the 11th Bomb Squadron, which trains B-52 aircrews and will be adding special emphasis on nuclear training.

On 16 April 2009, United States Secretary of Defense Robert Gates announced that Air Force Lieutenant General Frank Klotz was nominated to be the first commander of the Global Strike Command. Prior to his assignment to AFGSC, Klotz was the Assistant Vice Chief of Staff and Director of the Air Force Staff.

On 18 June, after an environmental assessment finding of "No Significant Impact", Barksdale Air Force Base was announced as the permanent location for AFGSC. On 7 August 2009, the command officially became active with Klotz assuming command of the organization. The headquarters staff includes 900 people, and reached full operational capability by 30 September 2010.

The Twentieth Air Force, the service's missile organization, came under the new command on 1 December 2009, and the Eighth Air Force, the bomber component, came under the command on 1 February 2010.

== Role and operations ==
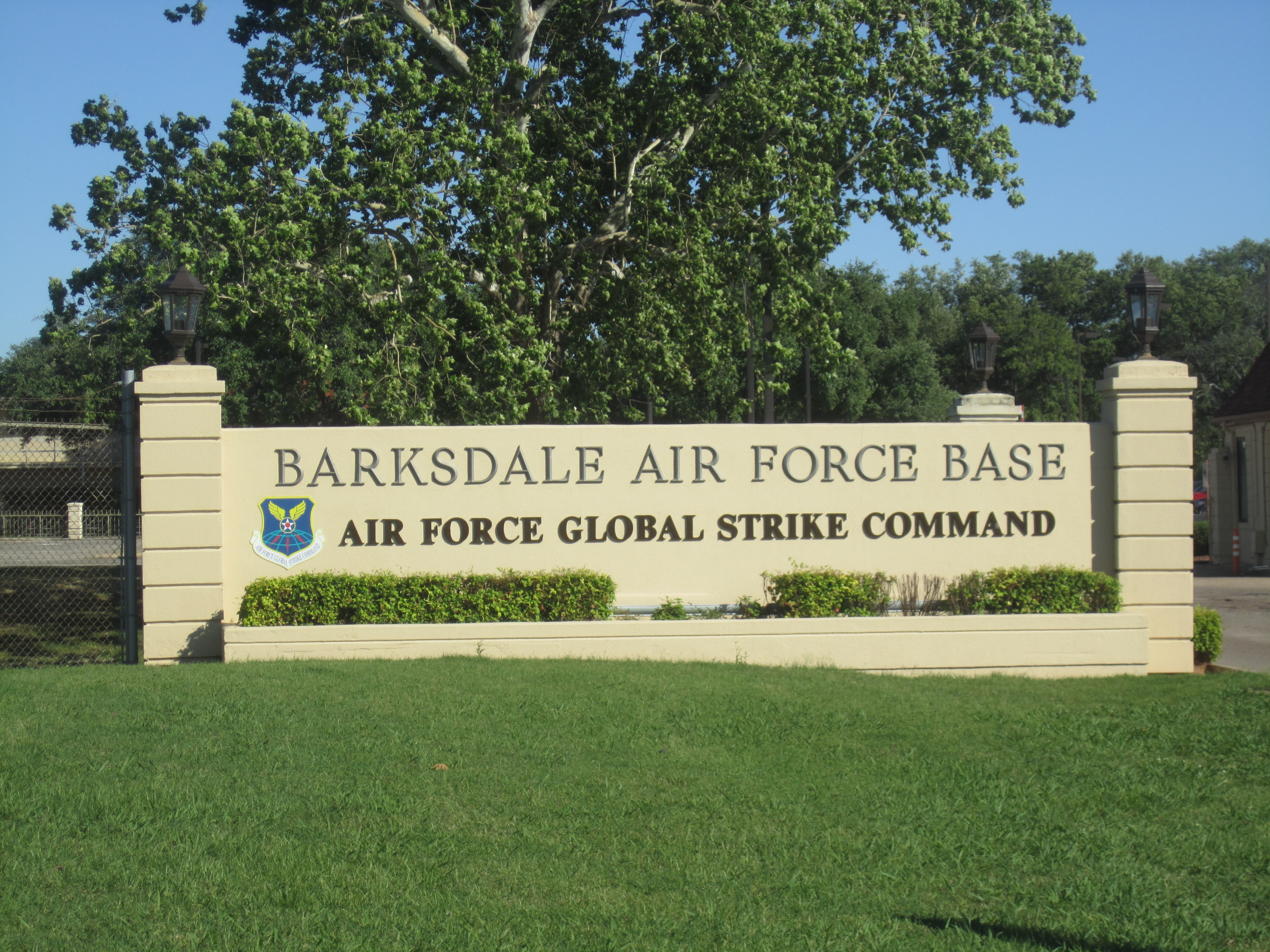
Air Force Global Strike Command headquarters is based at Barksdale Air Force Base in Louisiana

Air Force Global Strike Command was established for the improvement of the management of the USAF portion of the United States' nuclear arsenal, which accounts for two-thirds of America's nuclear deterrent. It assumed responsibility for the nuclear-capable assets of Air Force Space Command on 1 December 2009 and the nuclear-capable assets of Air Combat Command on 1 February 2010.

The creation of Air Force Global Strike Command was outlined in the recommendations of the investigation following the 2007 United States Air Force nuclear weapons incident. The command was activated 7 August 2009, at Barksdale Air Force Base, Louisiana.

The mission of Air Force Global Strike Command is to "Develop and provide combat-ready forces for nuclear deterrence and global strike operations --Safe --Secure --Effective to support the President of the United States and combatant commanders." The command has a worldwide area of responsibility (AOR) as a subordinate component command of United States Strategic Command.

AFGSC consists of over 31,000 personnel assigned to nine wings, two geographically-separated squadrons and one detachment in the continental United States and deployed to locations around the globe.

Changes to the AFGSC units began with the announcement of the 377th Air Base Wing's realignment in December 2014. In mid-April 2015, Air Force Times reported that "B-1 bombers from Ellsworth Air Force Base in South Dakota and Dyess Air Force Base in Texas [will be] joining their long-range B-2 and B-52 bomber counterparts under a single Air Force command as part of a leadership shift announced Monday." This means that two bomb wings formerly under Air Combat Command will shift into AFGSC. The units came under the command on 1 October 2015. On 6 October 2016, the 595th Command and Control Group was activated at Offutt Air Force Base, Nebraska to assume the responsibility for the Boeing E-4 NAOC mission.

=== Strategic bombers ===
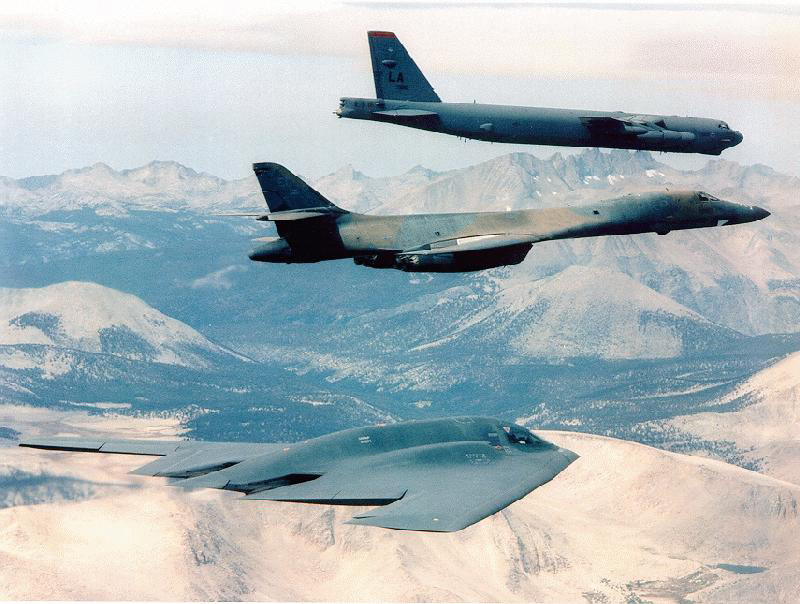
A B-52 Stratofortress, B-1B Lancer and B-2A Spirit

Eighth Air Force is designated as U.S. Strategic Command's Task Force 204 (TF 204), providing on-alert, combat-ready forces to the President of the United States. The mission of "The Mighty Eighth" is to safeguard America's interests through strategic deterrence and global combat power. Eighth Air Force controls long-range nuclear-capable bomber assets throughout the United States and overseas locations. Its flexible, conventional and nuclear deterrence mission provides the capability to deploy forces and engage enemy threats from home station or forward positioned, anywhere, any time. The 8th Air Force motto is "Deterrence through strength, global strike on demand." Offensive aircraft assets include the Northrop Grumman B-2 Spirit, Boeing B-52 Stratofortress, and Boeing B-1B Lancer.

The Missouri Air National Guard's 131st Bomb Wing is an associate unit of the 509th Bomb Wing at Whiteman AFB, flying the B-2A Spirit. If federalized, it is gained by Eighth Air Force. The Air Force Reserve Command's 307th Bomb Wing is an associate unit of the 2nd Bomb Wing at Barksdale AFB, flying the B-52H Stratofortress. In addition, its geographically separated 489th Bomb Group is an associate unit of the 7th Bomb Wing at Dyess AFB, flying the B-1B Lancer. If activated, it is gained by Eighth Air Force.

=== Intercontinental ballistic missiles ===
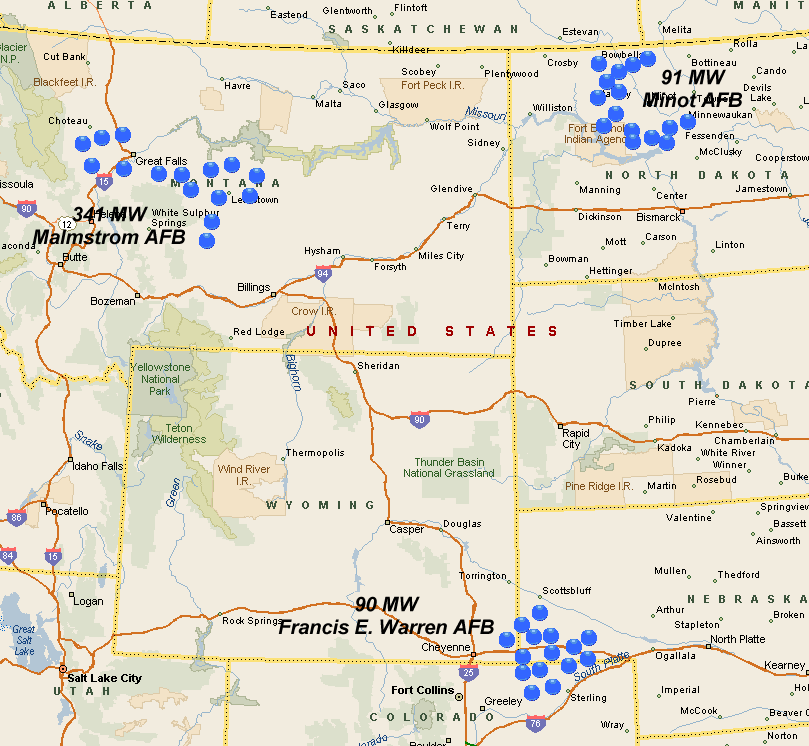
U.S. ground-based nuclear weapons (all LGM-30 Minuteman missiles) are deployed across three Air Force bases, spanning five states.

Twentieth Air Force is responsible for maintaining and operating the Air Force's intercontinental ballistic missile force. Designated as USSTRATCOM's Task Force 214 (TF 214), 20th Air Force provides on-alert, combat-ready ICBMs to the President of the United States. The ICBMs are on 24-hour/365-day alert and are ready to launch on any given day.

AFGSC's Twentieth Air Force is the Air Force's lead command for and largest operator of UH-1N Huey helicopters. The UH-1N supports ICBM operations in missile fields controlled by F.E. Warren, Malmstrom and Minot Air Force Bases. In 2015, the 582nd Helicopter Group was activated to supervise the three UH-1 squadrons. The Huey will be replaced by the Boeing MH-139 Grey Wolf.

== Component units ==
Air Force Global Strike Command comprises the following wings and major units.

- Headquarters Air Force Global Strike Command (Barksdale AFB, Louisiana)

=== Eighth Air Force ===
- Headquarters Eighth Air Force (Barksdale AFB)
- 2nd Bomb Wing (Barksdale AFB) – B-52H Stratofortress
  - 11th Bomb Squadron
  - 20th Bomb Squadron
  - 96th Bomb Squadron
- 5th Bomb Wing (Minot AFB, North Dakota) – B-52H Stratofortress
  - 23rd Bomb Squadron
  - 69th Bomb Squadron
- 7th Bomb Wing (Dyess AFB, Texas) – B-1B Lancer
  - 9th Bomb Squadron
  - 28th Bomb Squadron
- 28th Bomb Wing (Ellsworth AFB, South Dakota) – B-1B Lancer
  - 34th Bomb Squadron
  - 37th Bomb Squadron
- 509th Bomb Wing (Whiteman AFB, Missouri) – B-2A Spirit
  - 13th Bomb Squadron
  - 393rd Bomb Squadron
- 595th Command and Control Group (Offut AFB, Nebraska)
  - 1st Airborne Command Control Squadron – E-4B Advanced Airborne Command Post
  - 595th Aircraft Maintenance Squadron
  - 595th Strategic Communications Squadron
  - 625th Strategic Operations Squadron
- 608th Air Operations Center (Barksdale AFB)

=== Twentieth Air Force ===
- Headquarters Twentieth Air Force (Francis E. Warren AFB, Wyoming)
- 90th Missile Wing (Francis E. Warren AFB) – LGM-30G Minuteman-III
  - 319th Missile Squadron
  - 320th Missile Squadron
  - 321st Missile Squadron
- 91st Missile Wing (Minot AFB) – LGM-30G Minuteman-III
  - 740th Missile Squadron
  - 741st Missile Squadron
  - 742nd Missile Squadron
- 341st Missile Wing (Malmstrom AFB, Montana) – LGM-30G Minuteman-III
  - 10th Missile Squadron
  - 12th Missile Squadron
  - 490th Missile Squadron
- 377th Air Base Wing (Kirtland AFB, New Mexico)
- 576th Flight Test Squadron (Vandenberg SFB, California)
- 582nd Helicopter Group (Francis E. Warren AFB) – UH-1N Iroquois
- 620th Ground Combat Training Squadron (Camp Guernsey, Wyoming)

=== Air reserve ===
Air Force Global Strike Command has operational "gaining command" responsibility for several Air Reserve Component (ARC) units, comprising personnel and aircraft from Air Force Reserve Command (AFRC) and the Air National Guard (ANG).

Air Force Reserve Command

- 307th Bomb Wing (Barksdale AFB)
  - 307th Operations Group (Barksdale AFB)
    - 93d Bomb Squadron – B-52H Stratofortress
    - 343d Bomb Squadron – B-52H Stratofortress
  - 489th Bomb Group (Dyess AFB)
    - 345th Bomb Squadron – B-1B Lancer

Missouri Air National Guard

- 131st Bomb Wing (Whiteman AFB)
  - 131st Operations Group (Whiteman AFB)
    - 110th Bomb Squadron – B-2A Spirit

=== Other units ===
- Air Operations Group (Otis ANGB, Massachusetts)
- USAF Nuclear Command, Control and Communications Center (Barksdale AFB)

== List of commanders ==
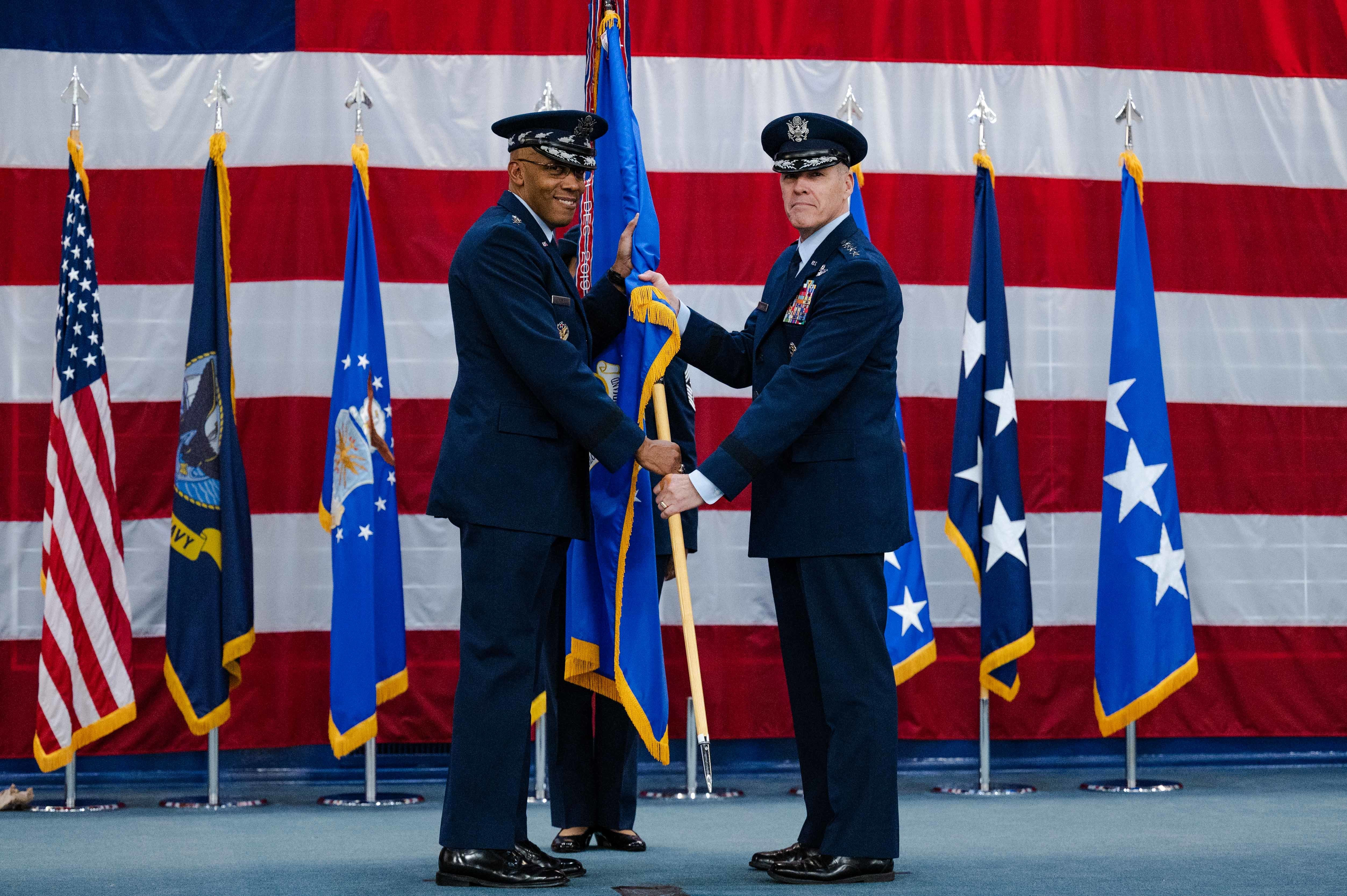
Gen Thomas A. Bussiere (right) assumes command of AFGSC on 7 December 2022.

Since January 2026, the position of commander is a statutory office (10 U.S.C. § 9068) held by a four-star general.

| No. | Commander | | Term | | |
| No. | Portrait | Name | Took office | Left office | Term length |
|---|---|---|---|---|---|
| 1 | Frank Klotz | Lieutenant General; Frank Klotz (born 1950) | 7 August 2009 | 6 January 2011 | 1 year, 152 days |
| 2 | James Kowalski | Lieutenant General; James Kowalski (born 1957) | 6 January 2011 | 23 October 2013 | 2 years, 290 days |
| 3 | Stephen W. Wilson | Lieutenant General; Stephen W. Wilson (born 1959/1960) | 23 October 2013 | 28 July 2015 | 1 year, 278 days |
| 4 | Robin Rand | General; Robin Rand (born 1955/1956) | 28 July 2015 | 21 August 2018 | 3 years, 24 days |
| 5 | Timothy M. Ray | General; Timothy M. Ray | 21 August 2018 | 27 August 2021 | 3 years, 6 days |
| 6 | Anthony J. Cotton | General; Anthony J. Cotton | 27 August 2021 | 7 December 2022 | 1 year, 102 days |
| 7 | Thomas A. Bussiere | General; Thomas A. Bussiere (born c. 1963) | 7 December 2022 | 4 November 2025 | 2 years, 332 days |
| 8 | Stephen L. Davis | General; Stephen L. Davis (born c. 1967) | 4 November 2025 | Incumbent | 347 days |

== Lineage ==
- Established as Continental Air Forces on 13 December 1944

Activated on 15 December 1944
Redesignated: Strategic Air Command on 21 March 1946
Inactivated on 1 June 1992

- Redesignated as Air Force Global Strike Command, and activated, on 7 August 2009

=== Assignments ===
- United States Army Air Forces, 15 December 1944
- United States Air Force, 26 September 1947 – 1 June 1992
- United States Air Force, 7 August 2009–present.

=== Stations ===
- Washington, District of Columbia, 15 December 1944
- Bolling Air Force Base, District of Columbia, by 1946
- Andrews Air Force Base, Maryland, 21 October 1946
- Offutt Air Force Base, Nebraska, 9 November 1948 – 1 June 1992
- Barksdale Air Force Base, Louisiana, 7 August 2009–present

=== Aircraft and missiles ===
- Northrop Grumman B-2 Spirit (2009–present)
- Boeing B-52H Stratofortress (2009–present)
- Bell UH-1N Twin Huey (2009–present)
- LGM-30G Minuteman III (2009–present)
- B-1B Lancer (2015–present)
- Boeing E-4B (2016–present)
- Boeing MH-139 Grey Wolf (2019–present)

== See also ==
- Nuclear triad
- List of states with nuclear weapons

Comparable organizations

- United States Fleet Forces Command (U.S. Navy)
