= Strategic Air Command Digital Information Network =

The Strategic Air Command DIgital Network (SACDIN) was a United States military computer network that provided computerized record communications, replacing the Data Transmission Subsystem and part of the Data Display Subsystem of the SAC Automated Command and Control System. SACDIN enabled a rapid flow of communications from headquarters SAC to its fielded forces, such as B-52 bases and ICBM Launch Control Centers.

== Logistics ==
Major portions of SACDIN were developed, engineered and installed by the International Telephone and Telegraph (ITT) company, under contract to the Electronic Systems Center.

== Chronology ==
- 1969
  - - Headquarters SAC submits a request to the Joint Chiefs of Staff to study an expanded communications system, known as the SAC Total Information Network (SATIN). It would interconnect Air Force Satellite Communications (AFSATCOM), Advanced Airborne Command Post (AABNCP), Airborne Command Post (ABNCP), high frequency/single sideband radio HF/SSB radio, SAC Automated Command and Control System (SACCS), Automatic Digital Information Network (AUTODIN), Survivable Low Frequency Communications System (SLFCS) and Command Data Buffer (CDB)
- 1977
  - 1 November - SATIN IV was effectively terminated by Congress. The restructured program was renamed SAC Digital Network (SACDIN), and was formulated to meet SAC's minimum essential data communications requirements, but also had the capability to grow in a modular fashion.
- 1986
  - ?? ??? - SACDIN replaces much of the SAC Automated Command and Control System (SACCS) and the SAC Automated Total Information Network (SATIN)

== See also ==
- Strategic Automated Command and Control System (SACCS) - precursor (and resurrected successor) to SACDIN
- Post Attack Command and Control System (PACCS)
- Airborne Launch Control System (ALCS)
- Ground Wave Emergency Network (GWEN)
- Minimum Essential Emergency Communications Network (MEECN)
- Survivable Low Frequency Communications System (SLFCS)
- Primary Alerting System (PAS)
