= Air Force Satellite Communications =

US military communication system

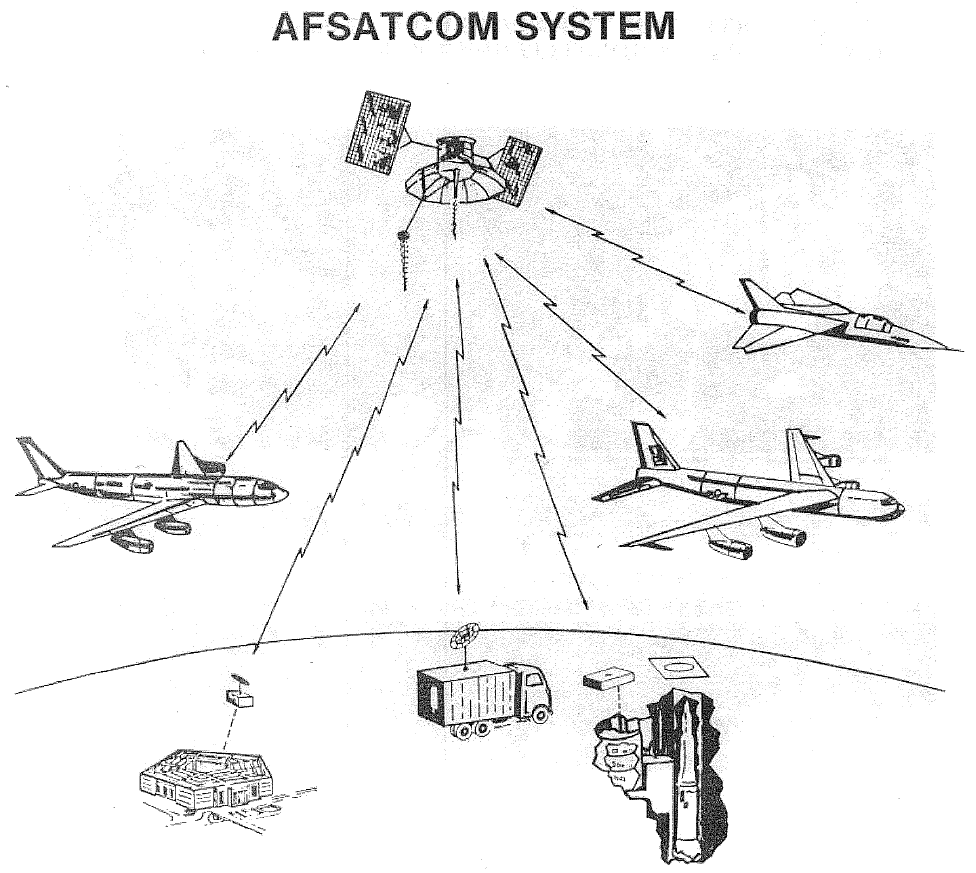

The United States military's Air Force Satellite Communications (AFSATCOM) system is a network of satellite and ground-based communications systems used to transmit messages to military forces worldwide. AFSATCOM was developed during the Cold War as part of the United States' nuclear command, control, and communications (NC3) architecture. One of its primary functions was to ensure the reliable delivery of Emergency Action Messages (EAMs) to Strategic Air Command and other strategic nuclear forces in the event of a conflict or disruption of conventional communications systems.

== Operations ==
AFSATCOM operations used leased transponders off United States Navy Fleet Satellite Communications (FLTSATCOM) satellites for EAM transmission.

== See also ==
- Strategic Automated Command and Control System (SACCS)
- Post Attack Command and Control System (PACCS)
- Airborne Launch Control System (ALCS)
- Ground Wave Emergency Network (GWEN)
- Minimum Essential Emergency Communications Network (MEECN)
- Survivable Low Frequency Communications System (SLFCS)
- Primary Alerting System (PAS)
- Strategic Air Command Digital Information Network (SACDIN)
