= Missile launch control center =

Control room for missile silos

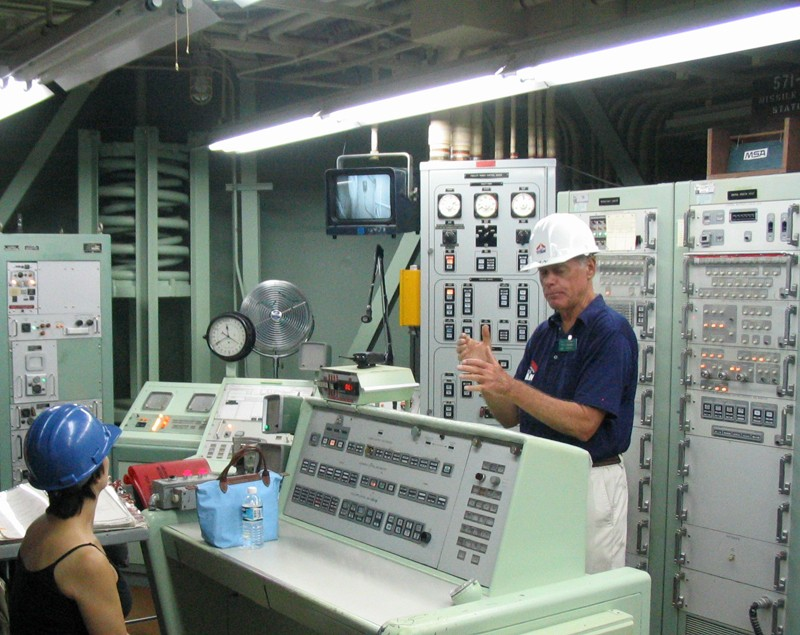
A guide (right) conducts a tour of the Launch Control Center at the Titan Missile Museum

A launch control center (LCC), in the United States, is the main control facility for intercontinental ballistic missiles (ICBMs). A launch control center monitors and controls missile launch facilities. From a launch control center, the missile combat crew can monitor the complex, launch the missile, or relax in the living quarters (depending on the ICBM system). The LCC is designed to provide maximum protection for the missile combat crew and equipment vital to missile launch. Missile silos are common across the western United States, and over 450 missiles remain in US Air Force (USAF) service.

Due to modern conventional weapons, missile launch control centers are becoming rarer in the US, and it is expected that the number of missiles will stay at 400 Minuteman III.

== General information ==
All LCCs are dependent on a missile support base (MSB) for logistics support. For example, Minot AFB is the MSB for the 91st Missile Wing.

Three types of Minuteman LCCs exist:

1. Alternate Command Post (ACP): performed backup functions to missile support base; control missile wing communications
2. Squadron Command Post (SCP): perform backup functions to ACP; control squadron execution and communications
3. Primary LCC (PLCC): perform execution and rapid message processing

There are four configurations of the LCC, differing primarily in the amount and location of communications equipment. Functionally, there are three LCC designations. One Alternate Command Post (ACP) LCC is located within each Minuteman wing and serves as backup for the wing command post. Three Squadron Command Posts (SCPs) serve as command units for the remaining squadrons within the wing, and report directly to the wing command post. The ACP doubles as SCP for the squadron it is located within. The remainder of the LCCs (16) are classified as primary LCCs. Four primary LCCs are located within each squadron and report to their respective command post.

== Titan II LCC ==
The Titan rocket LCCs held four crew members: the Missile Combat Crew Commander (MCCC), the Deputy Missile Combat Crew Commander (DMCCC), Ballistic Missile Analyst Technician (BMAT), and the Missile Facilities Technician (MFT).

Titan II had a three-story LCC dome. The first level was the crew's living area and contained a kitchen, bathroom, bedroom, and a small equipment area that housed an exhaust fan and a water heater. The second level was the launch control area and held the LCCFC (Launch Control Complex Facility Console, the main launch console), the ALOC (Alternate Launch Officer Console), the Control Monitor Group (monitored the missile), and several other pieces of equipment. The lowest level, level 3, held communications equipment, the two battery backup supplies, the sewage lift station, the motor-generator, and several other pieces of equipment.

There were two types of Titan II sites: standard, and ACP (alternate command post) sites. ACPs had all of the equipment that one would find on a standard site plus additional communication equipment.

== Minuteman facilities ==
=== Launch Control Center ===
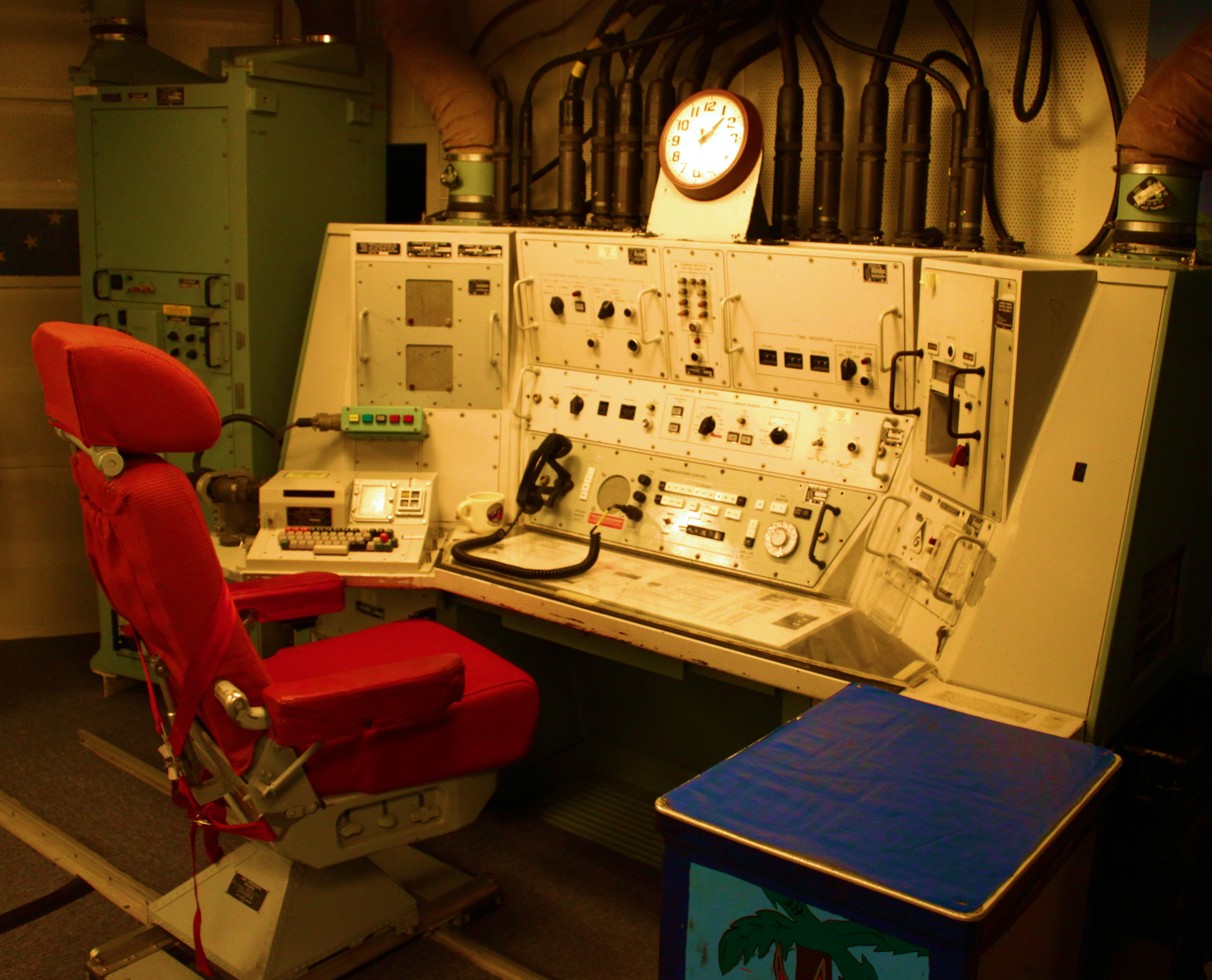
Minuteman III Launch Control, Oscar Zero Missile Alert Facility at the Ronald Reagan Minuteman Missile Site near Cooperstown, North Dakota.

A Minuteman wing consists of either three or four squadrons. Five flights comprise each squadron. Each flight directly controls ten Minuteman missiles remotely. Each flight is commanded from a Launch Control Center, or LCC.

The Minuteman LCC is an underground structure of reinforced concrete and steel of sufficient strength to withstand weapon effects. It contains equipment and a Missile combat crew of two officers capable of controlling, monitoring, and launching the 10 Minuteman missiles in unmanned launch facilities (LFs) within the flight. The Combat Crew monitors message traffic from higher headquarters to all the other four flights in its squadron, and has the ability to countermand launch attempts initiated by any other flight in its squadron.

One LCC in each Minuteman squadron is designated a Squadron Command Post and has the ability to take control of and remotely launch the Minuteman missiles of any other flight in its squadron, in the event of receipt of an authenticated Emergency War Order and the flight designated in the EWO fails to execute its ICBM fire mission contained therein. One of the wing's Squadron Command Posts is designated a Wing Command Post and can execute an authenticated EWO for any flight of Minuteman missiles in the wing. It can also countermand a launch attempt by any flight in any squadron in the wing.

The Minuteman Combat Crew has voice communications capability with all the LFs of the flight which it commands. Under ordinary circumstances this is almost always used to coordinate with maintenance crews on-site at an LF. If the maintenance crew is performing a site penetration (entry into the missile silo) communication with the Combat Crew will always be necessary in order to properly authenticate (prove who you are). Under extraordinary circumstances it may be necessary to communicate with a flight security squad that is dispatched to the LF, usually to investigate a perimeter security alarm.

Each Combat Crew has a voice circuit called the Hardened Voice Channel which links the five Combat Crews (LCCs) that comprise the squadron. There is also a voice circuit called the EWO (Emergency War Order) which links the squadron command posts (CPs). One of the squadron command posts (CPs) is also the wing CP. These two voice circuits work like a party line with all LCCs connected simultaneously. Thus, it is not possible for any of the Combat Crews to have private conversations. The term "EWO" used here is not to be confused with an actual Emergency War Order message from the National Command Authority. The same term is used to denote both this circuit and the message transmitted over the Primary Alert System.

Message traffic over the LF, HVC, and EWO voice circuits are transmitted via the Hardened Intersite Cable System.

Each Combat Crew also has access to commercial telephone lines for ordinary civilian communications.

The outer structure of the LCC itself is cylindrical with hemispherical ends. Its walls are of steel-reinforced concrete and approximately 4.5 feet thick. It is normally accessed from the LCF/MAF by a freight-size elevator. A blast door permits entry into the LCC from the tunnel junction (adjoining the LCC Equipment Building housing the backup diesel-electric generator and emergency supplies). An escape hatch 3-ft in diameter is located at the far end of the LCC. The escape hatch and associated tunnel are constructed to withstand weapon effects and allow personnel egress in the event of damage to the vertical access shaft. The tunnel is sand-filled and the sand will fall into the LCC if the hatch at the bottom of the tunnel is opened. Essential LCC launch equipment and communications gear, along with the missile combat crew, are located in a shock isolated compartment suspended within the outer structure. The room is steel and suspended as a pendulum by four shock isolators (see picture below).

The LCC's electronics are fully shielded from Electromagnetic Pulse damage with carbon block surge arresters.

=== REACT-A LCCs ===
REACT-A capsules were brought online in the mid-1990s and continue in service with the 341st Missile Wing, the 90th Missile Wing, and the 91st Missile Wing. This was an upgrade from the ILCS (Improved Launch Control System) capsules at the 341 MW that date to the late 1970s, and from the Command Data Buffer (CDB) capsules at the 90th and 91st missile wings. This was a major upgrade. The two launch control officers now sit side by side and must turn four launch keys to initiate a launch.

=== REACT-B LCCs ===
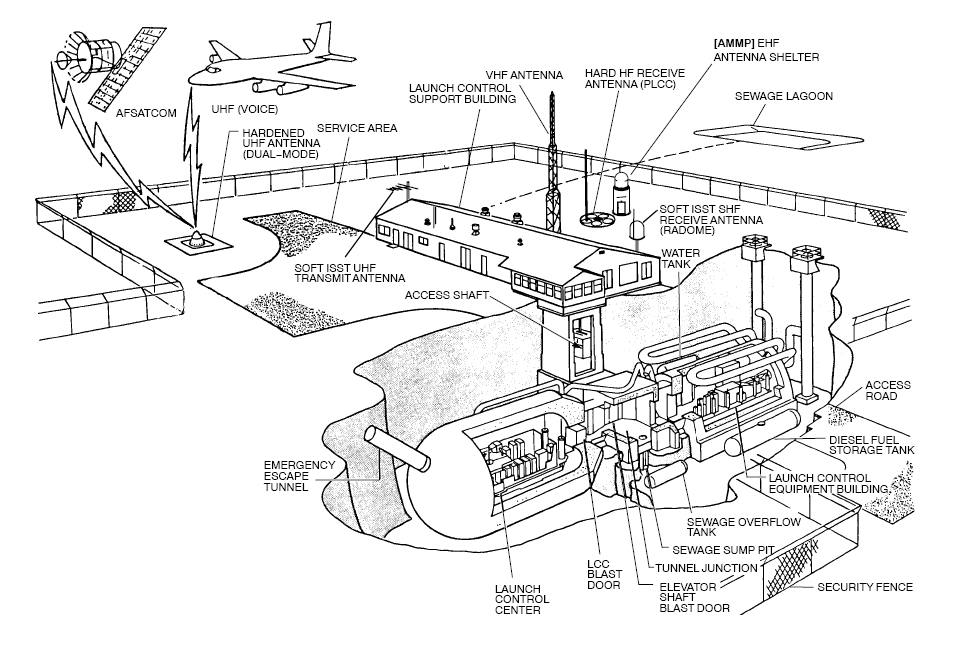
Typical Minuteman Missile Alert Facility

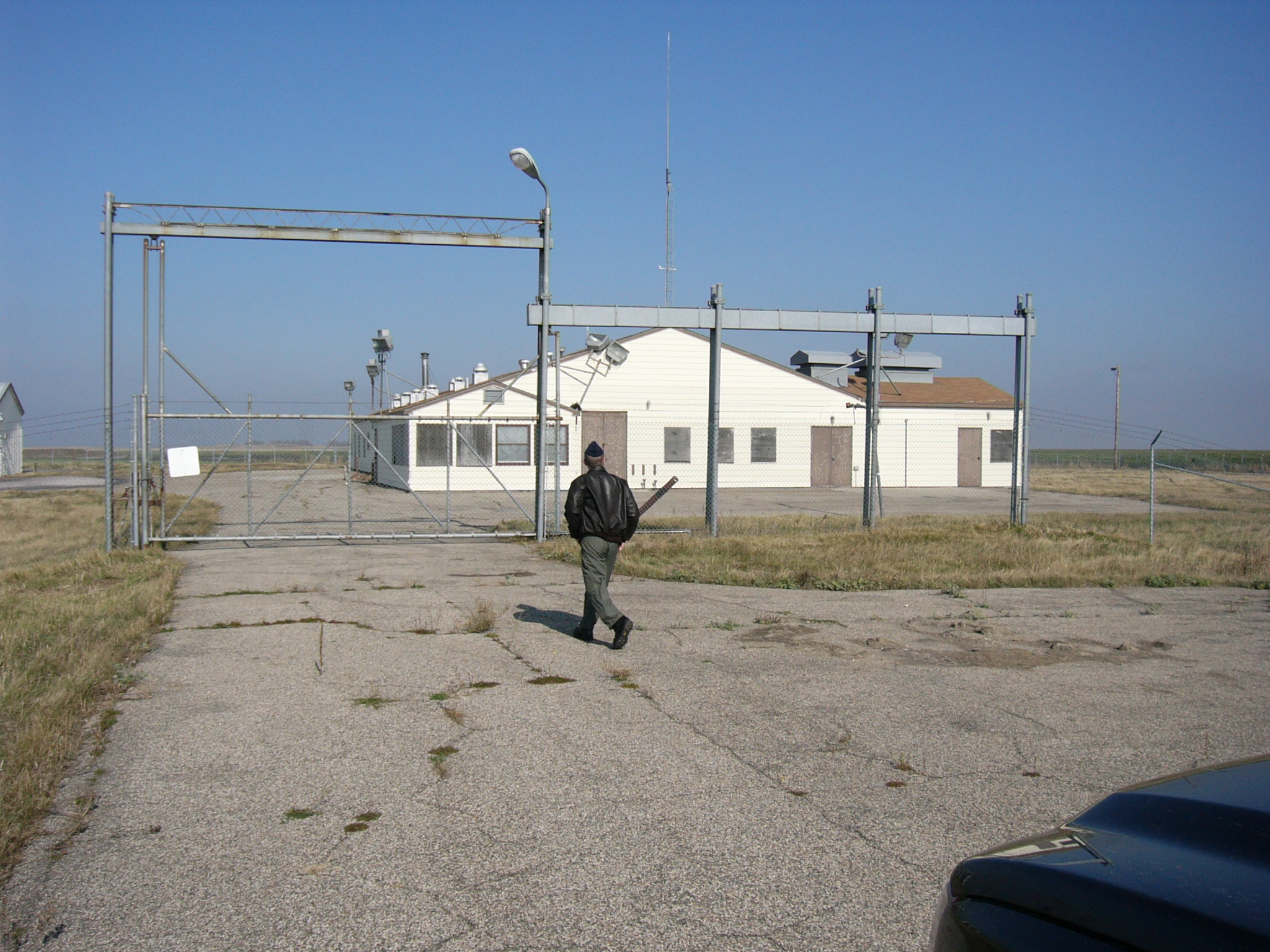
Abandoned Missile Alert Facility

The B/CDB capsules were upgraded to REACT-B in the mid-1990s and used only at the 321st Missile Wing at Grand Forks AFB, ND and the 564th Missile Squadron (the "odd squad") of the 341st Missile Wing at Malmstrom AFB, MT until both were shut down. (19 August 1998 for the 564th, 30 September 1998 for the 321st.)

=== CDB LCCs ===
Command Data Buffer (CDB) was a configuration for early Minuteman missiles at the 90th Missile Wing at FE Warren AFB, WY, the 91st Missile Wing at Minot AFB, ND, and the 351st Missile Wing at Whiteman AFB, MO. The overall layout of the LCC did not change through the upgrade to REACT, however there were some major equipment changes.

=== Airborne Launch Control Centers ===
Airborne Launch Control Centers (ALCC) provide a survivable launch capability for the Minuteman force by utilizing the Airborne Launch Control System (ALCS) which is operated by an airborne missile combat crew.

From 1967 to 1998, the ALCC mission was performed by United States Air Force EC-135 command post aircraft. This included EC-135A, EC-135C, EC-135G, and EC-135L aircraft. Today, the ALCC mission is performed by airborne missileers from Air Force Global Strike Command's (AFGSC) 625th Strategic Operations Squadron (STOS) and United States Strategic Command (USSTRATCOM). Starting on October 1, 1998, the ALCS has been located on board the United States Navy's E-6B Mercury. The ALCS crew is integrated into the battle staff of the USSTRATCOM "Looking Glass" Airborne Command Post (ABNCP) and is on alert around-the-clock.

=== Launch control equipment building ===
The Launch Control Equipment Building (LCEB) is a hardened, below-ground capsule for support equipment such as air conditioners, diesel generators, etc. At Wing 1 (and the former Wing 2 setup at Ellsworth AFB) this equipment is above ground ("topside") in the MAF.

=== Missile Alert Facility ===
A Minuteman Missile Alert Facility (MAF), previously known as the Launch Control Facility (LCF), is the above-ground component. It is "soft" or not able to withstand nuclear explosions. It consists of a security control office, dining room, kitchen, sleeping areas for the security forces stationed there (and occasional maintenance troops), garages for various vehicles, and other facilities.

=== Netlink ===
As of 2006, all Minuteman LCCs were modified to handle the LCC Netlink upgrade. The Netlink system brought internet access underground for missile combat crews.

=== Communications equipment ===
- Primary Alerting System (PAS)
- Strategic Automated Command and Control System (SACCS) - formerly known as Strategic Air Command Digital Information Network (SACDIN)
- Minimum Essential Emergency Communications Network (MEECN)
- Air Force Satellite Communications (AFSATCOM), using both Milstar and Defense Satellite Communications System satellites
- Survivable Low Frequency Communications System (SLFCS)
- Hardened Intersite Cable System lines (HICS)
- Voice Dial Lines 1 & 2

The Minuteman LCC differs from previous missile systems in that it only held room for two personnel, the Missile Combat Crew Commander (MCCC) and the Deputy Missile Combat Crew Commander (DMCCC).

Previously, each MAF was equipped with the ICBM SHF Satellite Terminal (ISST) communications system. This system has since been deactivated, with Francis E. Warren Air Force Base being the first to completely remove the system components.

== Peacekeeper LCC ==
The Peacekeeper LCCs were non-REACT modified CDB LCCs. Instead of replacing the command and control equipment, the 'old' Minuteman CDB C2 system was modified for the 50 Peacekeeper ICBMs.

== Photo gallery ==
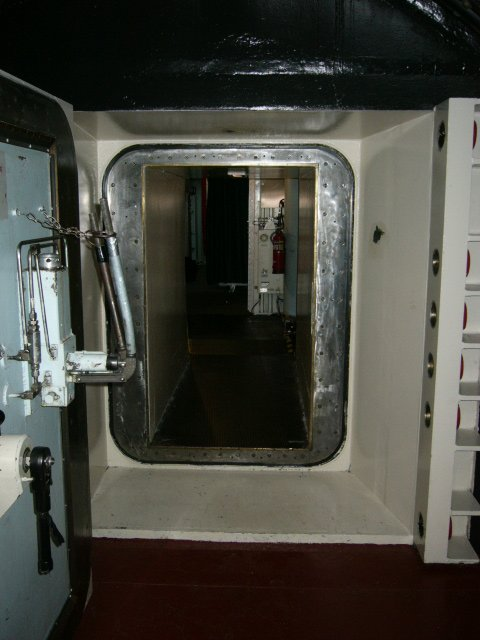
LCC tunnel junction

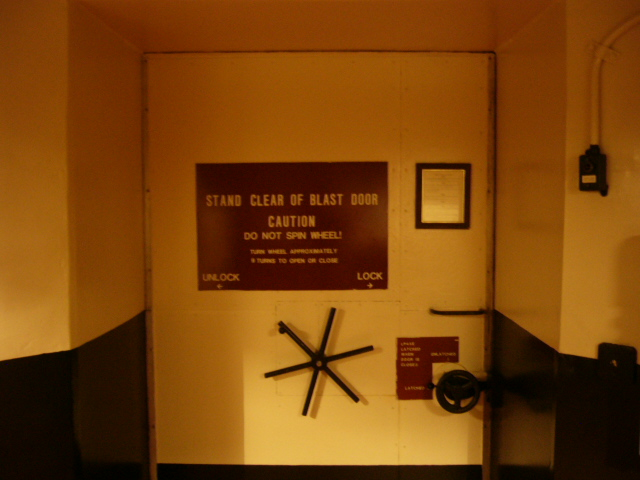
Launch Control Equipment Building Blast Door

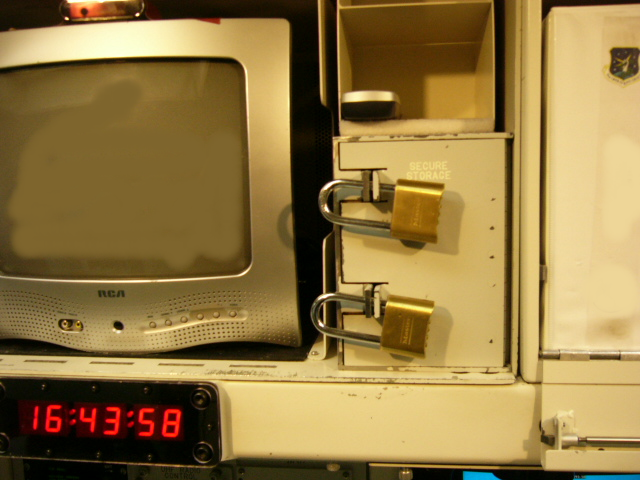
Sealed Authenticator System safe with two crew locks

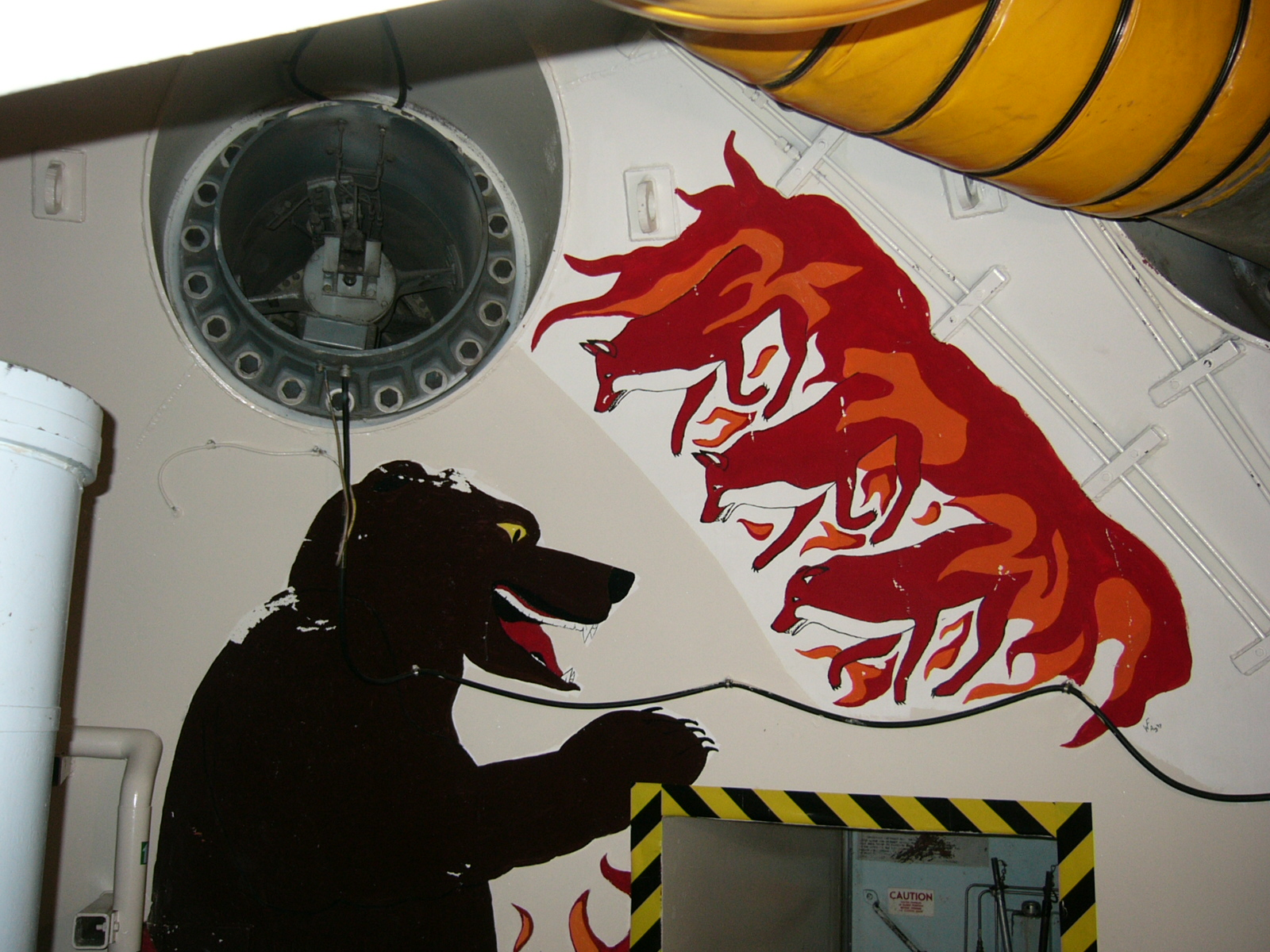
Art work at Foxtrot-01 LCC

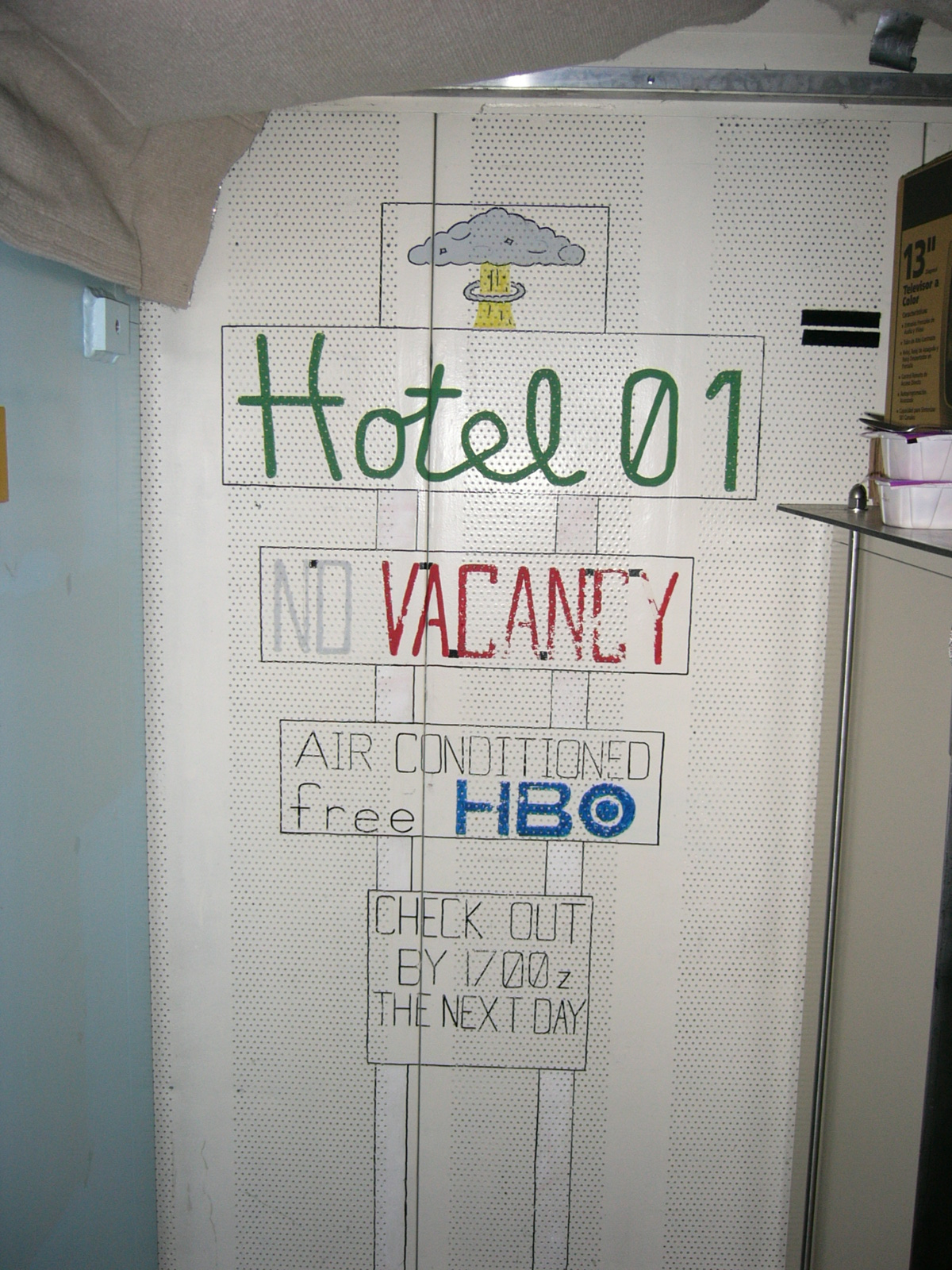
Art work at Hotel-01 LCC

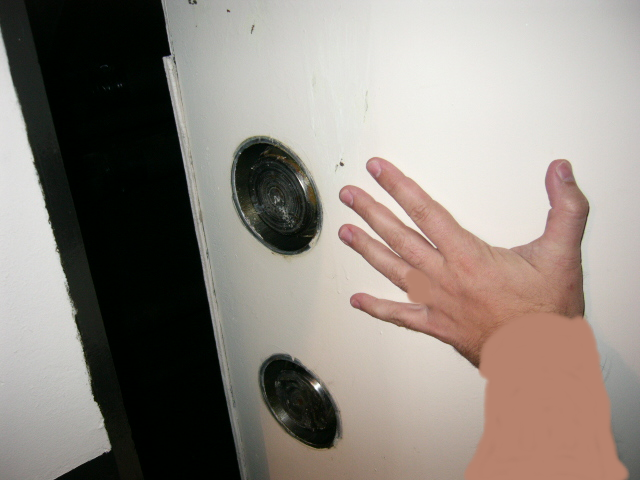
Blast Door Pins

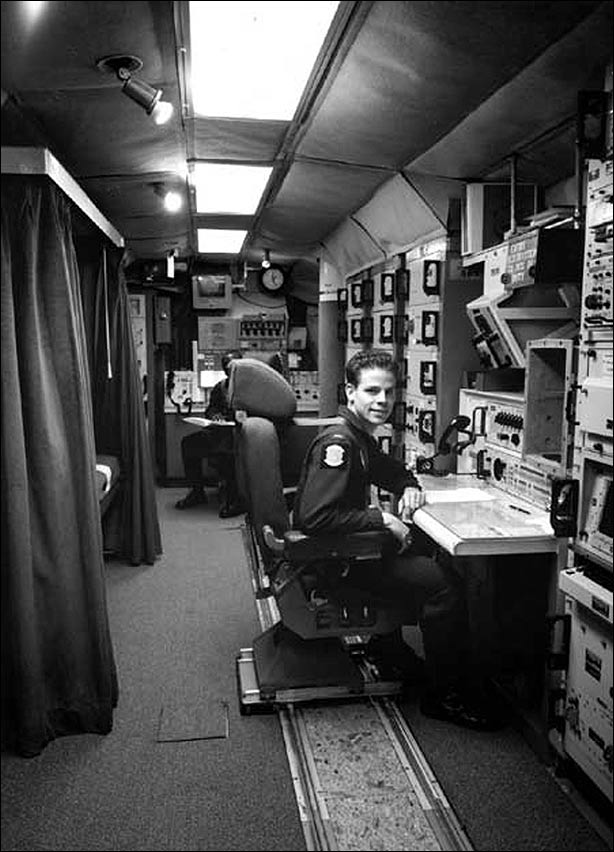
Command Data Buffer configuration

== See also ==
- Airborne Launch Control System (ALCS)
- Airborne Launch Control Center (ALCC)
- Continuity of government
- Emergency Rocket Communications System (ERCS)
- Game theory
- Ground Wave Emergency Network (GWEN)
- Minimum Essential Emergency Communications Network (MEECN)
- Post-Attack Command and Control System (PACCS)
- Survivable Low Frequency Communications System (SLFCS)
- The Cold War
