= Nuclear command and control =

Topic in nuclear warfare

Nuclear command and control (NC2) is the command and control of nuclear weapons. The U. S. military's Nuclear Matters Handbook 2015 defined it as the "activities, processes, and procedures performed by appropriate military commanders and support personnel that, through the chain of command, allow for senior-level decisions on nuclear weapons employment." The current Nuclear Matters Handbook 2020 [Revised] defines it as "the exercise of authority and direction, through established command lines, over nuclear weapon operations by the President as the chief executive and head of state."

== United States ==
In the United States, leadership decisions are communicated to the nuclear forces via an intricate Nuclear Command and Control System (NCCS). The NCCS provides the President of the United States with the means to authorize the use of nuclear weapons in a crisis and to prevent unauthorized or accidental use. It is an essential element to ensure crisis stability, deter attack against the United States and its allies, and maintain the safety, security, and effectiveness of the U.S. nuclear deterrent. Nuclear Command and Control and Communications (NC3), is managed by the Military Departments, nuclear force commanders, and the defense agencies. NCCS facilities include the fixed National Military Command Center (NMCC), the Global Operation Center (GOC), the airborne E-4B National Airborne Operations Center (NAOC), and the E-6B Take Charge and Move Out (TACAMO)/Airborne Command Post (Looking Glass)

The current Nuclear Matters Handbook 2020 [Revised] states: "The President bases this decision [to employ nuclear weapons] on many factors and will consider the advice and recommendations of senior advisors, to include the Secretary of Defense, the CJCS, and CCDRs." Note that both the 2015 and the 2020 Handbooks describe themselves as "unofficial."

The Ground Based Strategic Deterrent (GBSD) is entering the design review phase, as of 22 September 2021.

=== Bypass ===
On 27 June 1950, two days after the beginning of the Korean War, commander of Strategic Air Command Curtis LeMay made a covert agreement with Robert Miller Montague, commanding general of Sandia Base where the gravity bombs assigned to SAC were stored. The agreement allowed for SAC to take control of the bombs in the event of a nuclear attack and loss of communication with the President and "the alternate headquarters USAF". LeMay said "We had no idea of what confusion might exist, or who the president might be, or where, if a bomb hit Washington. ... I doubt if I would have retaliated if Washington were the only target hit. But I certainly would not have waited until half the country were destroyed."

=== STRATCOM Order of battle ===
United States Strategic Command has responsibility for the US' nuclear triad of strategic nuclear weapons, but does not have responsibility for all tactical nuclear weapons in US service.

- Commander, USSTRATCOM: General Anthony J. Cotton, USAF
  - Deputy Commander, USSTRATCOM: Vice Admiral Richard A. Correll, USN
    - Chief of Staff: Major General Gregory "Greg" Brady, USA
    - Command Senior Enlisted Leader: Sergeant Major Howard L. Kreamer, USMC
- United States Strategic Command (USSTRATCOM) (Offutt AFB, NE)
  - Joint Information Operations Center (Offutt AFB, NE)
  - Strategic Communications Wing 1 (SCW 1) (TACAMO) (E-6B) (Tinker AFB, OK)
  - Air Force Global Strike Command (Barksdale Air Force Base, LA)
    - 20th Air Force (F. E. Warren AFB, WY)
      - 90th Missile Wing (LGM-118A, LGM-30G, UH-1N) (Francis E Warren AFB, WY)
      - 91st Missile Wing (LGM-30G, UH-1N) (Minot AFB, ND)
      - 341st Missile Wing (LGM-30G, UH-1N) (Malmstrom AFB, MT)
  - (8th Air Force (Barksdale AFB, LA))
  - Fleet Forces Command (FFC) (NB Norfolk, VA)
    - Naval Submarine Forces (NAVSUBFOR) (NB Norfolk, VA)
      - Submarine Force Atlantic Fleet (SUBLANT) (NB Norfolk, VA)
        - Submarine Group 10 (SUBGRU 10) (NSB Kings Bay, GA)
      - Submarine Force Pacific Fleet (SUBPAC) (NB Pearl Harbor, HI)
        - Submarine Group 9 (SUBGRU 9) (NB Kitsap, WA)
  - US Army Space and Missile Defense Command (USARSPACE) / US Army Forces Strategic Command (USARSTRAT) (Arlington, VA)
    - 100th Missile Defense Brigade (Ground-based Missile Defense) (Peterson AFB, CO)
  - Marine Forces Strategic Command (MARFORSTRAT) (Offutt AFB, NE)
  - Naval Network Warfare Command (NETWARCOM) (NAB Little Creek, VA)
  - Joint Task Force-Global Network Operations (Offutt AFB, NE)

== Artificial intelligence ==
In February 2026, the Trump administration publicly reaffirmed that decisions regarding the employment of nuclear weapons would remain subject to human control. In a statement to The Washington Post, a senior defense official said, "It remains the Department's policy that there is a human in the loop on all decisions on whether to employ nuclear weapons," and added that there was "no policy under consideration to put this decision in the hands of AI." The statement was issued amid broader discussion about the role of artificial intelligence in U.S. defense systems and was presented as consistent with existing U.S. nuclear command doctrine. In October 2025, a Trump administration Acting Permanent Representative to the Conference on Disarmament stated that, to "make the U.S. commitment on this matter very clear: The United States remains committed to maintain a “human in the loop” for all actions critical to informing and executing decisions by the President to initiate and terminate nuclear weapons employment. We stand by the commitment made alongside the UK and France to maintain human control for all actions critical to informing and executing sovereign decisions concerning nuclear weapons employment."

In addition to executive branch statements, Congress enacted this same language in Section 1638 of the National Defense Authorization Act for Fiscal Year 2025 (Public Law 118-159), making it part of U.S. statutory law. Passed by a majority of the House and the Senate, this section of the law mandates that artificial intelligence efforts must not undermine the integrity of nuclear safeguards, the authentication of command communications, or the principle that the execution of presidential nuclear employment decisions requires positive human action. As enacted legislation, the provision carries the force of federal law.

In November 2024, Chinese leader Xi Jinping agreed on the need to maintain human control over the use of nuclear weapons. The discussion broached the broader issues of military applications of artificial intelligence.

== Other countries ==
- Nuclear Command Authority (India), the authority responsible for command, control and operational decisions regarding India's nuclear weapons programme
- National Command Authority (Pakistan), the command that oversees the deployment, research and development, and operational command and control of Pakistan's nuclear arsenal
- Category:United Kingdom nuclear command and control
- Nuclear Command Corps

== See also ==
- Emergency Action Message
- Launch control center (ICBM)
