= TACAMO =

US strategic communications system

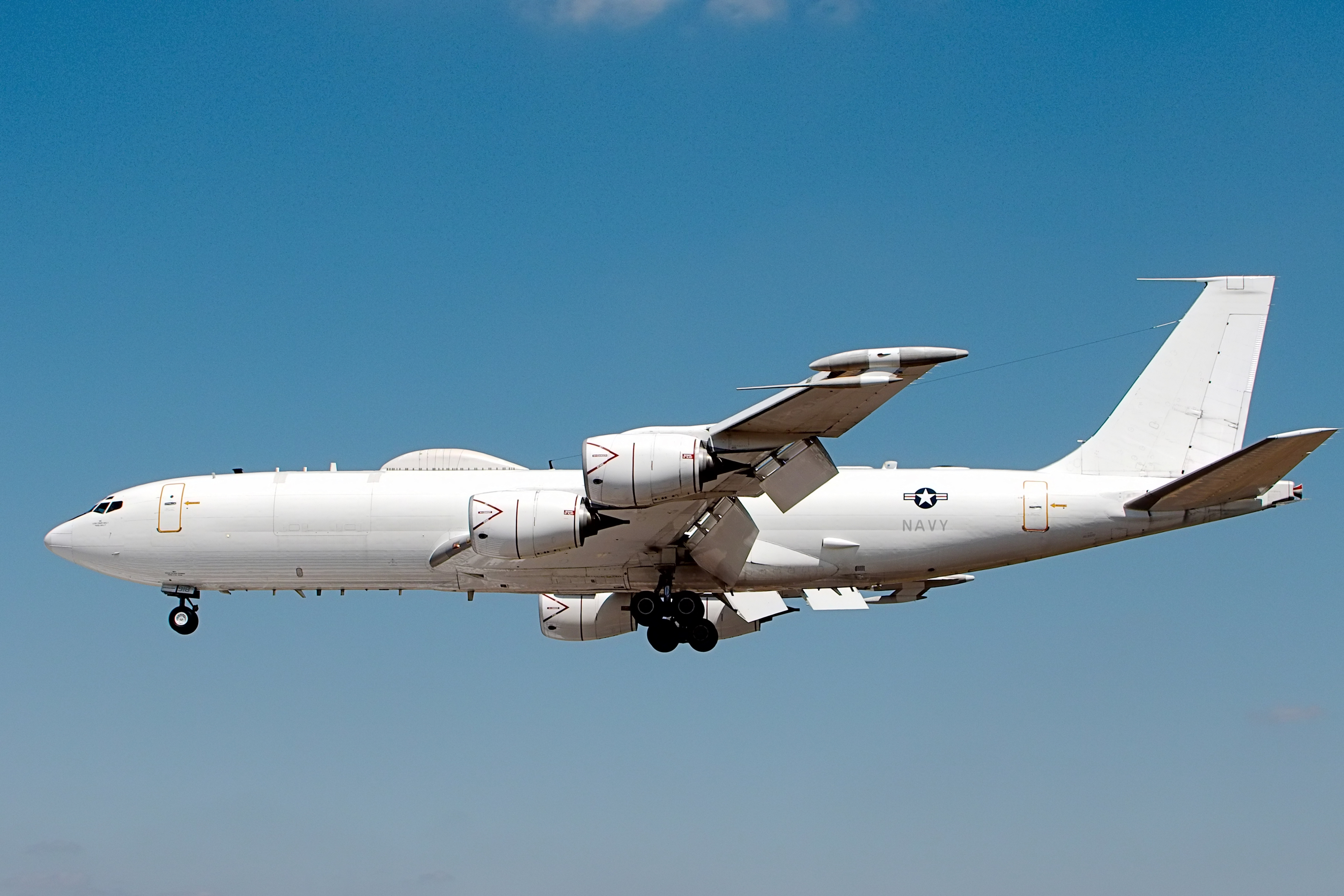
A Boeing E-6B Mercury airborne, painted anti-flash white

TACAMO (Take Charge And Move Out) is a United States military system of survivable communications links designed to be used in nuclear warfare to maintain communications between the decision-makers (the National Command Authority) and the triad of strategic nuclear weapon delivery systems. Its primary mission is serving as a signals relay, where it receives orders from a command plane such as Operation Looking Glass, and verifies and retransmits their Emergency Action Messages (EAMs) to US strategic forces.

As a dedicated communications post, it features the ability to communicate on virtually every radio frequency band from very low frequency (VLF) up to super high frequency (SHF), using a variety of modulations, encryptions and networks, minimizing the likelihood an emergency message will be jammed by an enemy. This airborne communications capability largely replaced the land-based extremely low frequency (ELF) broadcast sites, which are vulnerable to nuclear strikes.

== Components ==
The current TACAMO system comprises several components. The main part is the airborne portion, the U.S. Navy's Strategic Communications Wing One (STRATCOMWING 1), a U.S. Strategic Command (USSTRATCOM) organization based at Tinker Air Force Base, Oklahoma.

STRATCOMWING 1 consists of three fleet air reconnaissance squadrons (VQ-3, VQ-4, and VQ-7), equipped with Boeing IDS E-6B Mercury TACAMO aircraft. As well as the main operating base at Tinker, there is a west coast alert base at Travis AFB, California, and an east coast alert base at NAS Patuxent River, Maryland.

== History ==
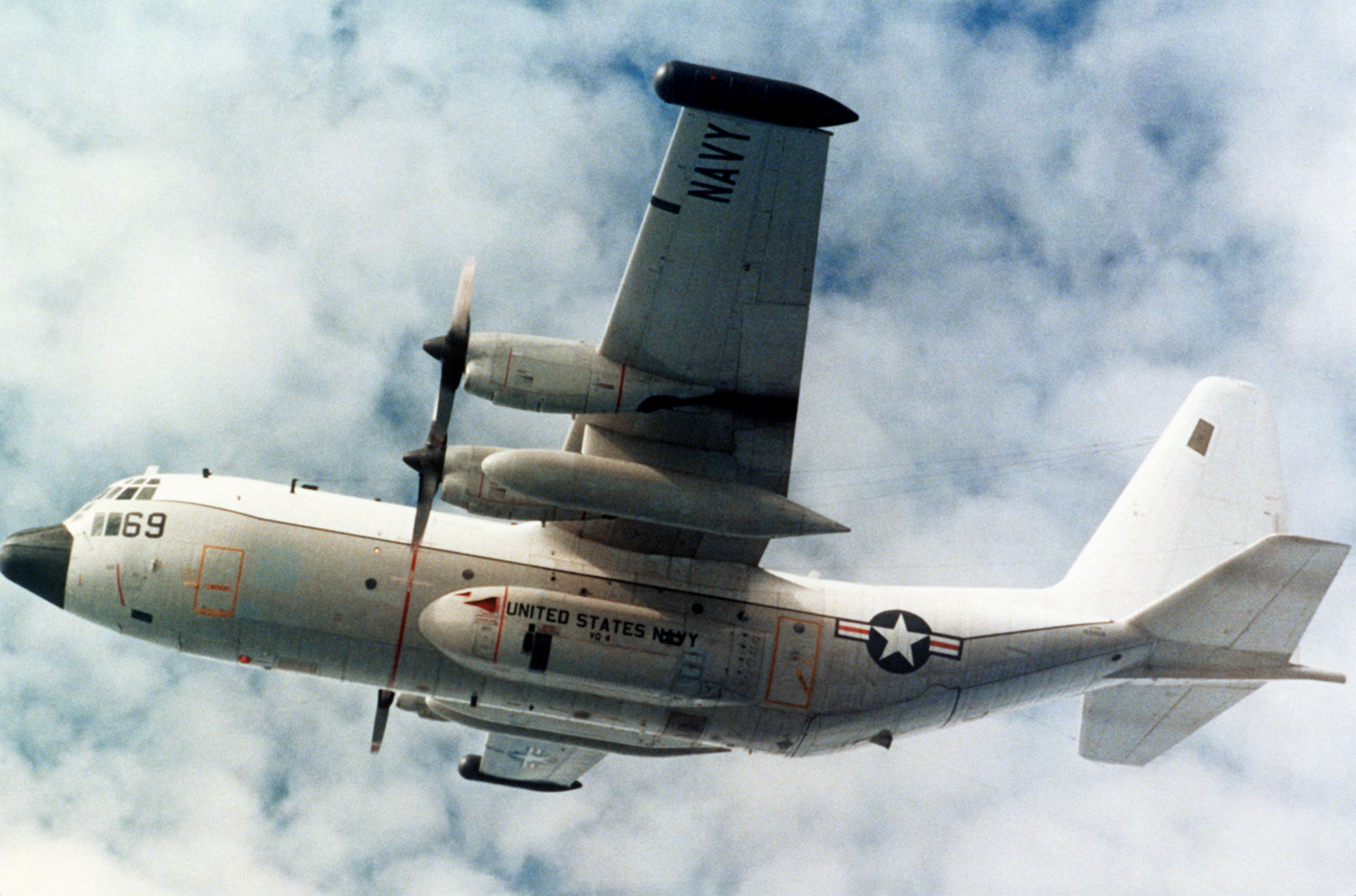
A U.S. Navy TACAMO EC-130Q of VQ-4, 1984.

The acronym was coined in 1961. In 1962, the first aircraft modified for TACAMO testing was a Lockheed KC-130 Hercules, fitted with a VLF transmitter and trailing wire antenna to test communications with the fleet ballistic missile submarines (see communication with submarines).

The Naval Air Development Center developed the required technique of "stalling" the trailing antenna to achieve the long vertical antenna needed. The VLF system is currently known as VERDIN (VERy low frequency Digital Information Network). In 1966, the program was expanded using modified C-130s designated Lockheed EC-130G/Q, carrying a VLF system built by Collins Radio Company.

In 1968, the first two squadrons were established: VQ-4 initially operated from Naval Air Station Patuxent River, Maryland. VQ-3 was formed at NAS Barbers Point, Hawaii before moving to Naval Air Station Agana, Guam, but later returned to NAS Barbers Point.

The system known as TACAMO (from "take charge and move out") has been operationally deployed in 1969. TACAMO consisted of twelve Lockheed EC-130Q aircraft equipped with VLF transmitters using long trailing wire antennas. The VLF system was repeatedly upgraded to improve signal strength.

By 1971, TACAMO IV incorporated a 200 kW transmitter and dual antenna. Actual transmission power and capabilities remain classified. Airborne ELF was tested but considered infeasible. Beginning in 1990, the aircraft were upgraded to the E-6 Mercury. From 1998, the E-6A was upgraded to the dual-role E-6B. With the introduction of the E-6, the Navy also stood up a Fleet Replacement Squadron (FRS), VQ-7, to provide initial training for new Naval Aviators, Naval Flight Officers and enlisted Naval Aircrewmen, and recurrent training for former TACAMO crewmembers returning to aircraft for second and third tours.

The E-6 aircraft is based on the Boeing 707. The wings were redesigned to meet new wing-loading characteristics. The tail was redesigned after a catastrophic failure of the vertical stabilizer during flight tests. The cockpit was copied from the Boeing 737NG commercial airliner, and the landing gear was modified to handle the added weight. Larger fuel tanks were installed and the fuselage was extensively modified to accommodate the 31 antennas, including the trailing wire antenna and reel assembly. After the upgrade to the E-6B, the TACAMO aircraft—with the addition of an Airborne Launch Control System (ALCS)—took over the EC-135 Looking Glass mission, formerly conducted by the USAF 55th Wing at Offutt AFB, Nebraska.

In early 1991, TACAMO planes, which have been in the air nonstop for nearly three decades, were transferred to "interim ground alert" and their flights continued on a "random basis" off the US east and west coasts.

In December 2020 (Fiscal Year 2021), the US Navy awarded a contract to Lockheed Martin to purchase C-130J-30 Hercules as a testbed for the TACAMO mission. The aircraft selection represents a return to the C-130 platform by the Navy, which for years used the EC-130Q (an older variant despite the higher letter) for the TACAMO mission from 1963 until 1993.

In October 2024, the Navy announced that the new C-130J-30 based TACAMO mission aircraft will be designated E-130J. It will replace the currently operational E-6 Mercury in the near future.

== See also ==
- Boeing E-4
- Survivable Low Frequency Communications System (SLFCS)
- Ground Wave Emergency Network (GWEN)
- Minimum Essential Emergency Communications Network (MEECN)
- Emergency Rocket Communications System (ERCS)
