= Strategic Automated Command and Control System =

United States Strategic Command command and control system

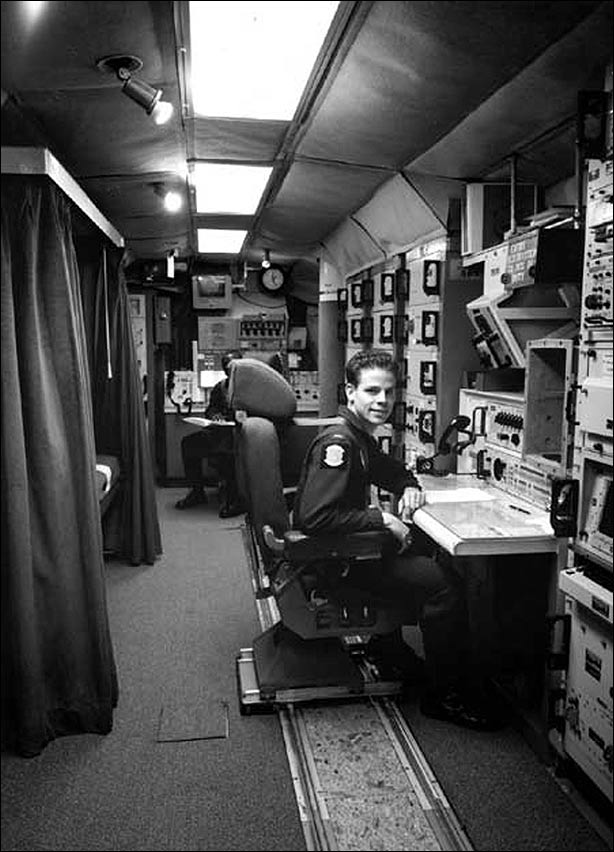
Command Data Buffer configuration in 1991, including part of the SACCS Replacement Keyboard (SRK), Line Printer Unit (LPU) and associated equipment rack (right edge of photo) in an underground missile launch facility.

The Strategic Automated Command and Control System (SACCS) is a United States Strategic Command command and control system for intercontinental ballistic missiles, nuclear-armed long-range bombers, and ballistic missile submarines.

== Background ==
The ITT 465L Strategic Air Command Control System (SACCS) with its IBM AN/FSQ-31 SAC Data Processing Systems attained operational capability on January 1, 1968. On October 6, 1975, it began to be replaced, when the SACCS original IBM 4020 Military Computers were replaced by Honeywell 6080 computers (remaining FSQ-31 components were entirely decommissioned in November.) The Strategic Air Command Digital Information Network was deployed to replace SACCS' "Data Transmission Subsystem and part of the Data Display Subsystem", e.g., on November 5, 1986, "Martin Marietta Corporation technicians began installing SAC Digital Network (SACDIN) equipment in 91st Strategic Missile Wing missile launch control centers (i.e., either a HUTE rack or MBCP rack). On February 20, 1987, "SAC declared initial operational capability for the SAC Digital Network when [it] operated successfully between the Headquarters SAC Command Center and the 55th Strategic Reconnaissance Wing Command Post, both located at Offutt AFB, Nebraska, and the 351st Strategic Missile Wing Command Post at Whiteman AFB, Missouri." SACDIN eventually "linked 135 locations and permitted two-way message communications with ICBM launch control centers for the first time," and the Ground Wave Emergency Network communication system had a Final Environmental Impact Statement issued in September 1987.

== SAC Automated Command and Control System ==
Strategic Air Command was disestablished in the early 1990s.

Despite the command's inactivation, the SAC Automated Command and Control System continued using that name for several years. The former SAC C^{2} system formed part of "USSTRATCOM Command and Control" (PE 0101316F)(except for the SACCS Data Processing System) .

The USSTRATCOM SACCS was later redesignated Strategic Automated Command and Control System with the same acronym.

By 1995, the Emergency War Order communication systems "..consist[ed] of the primary alert system (PAS), SAC digital network (SACDIN), Survivable Low Frequency Communications System (SLFCS), Air Force Satellite Communications System (AFSATCOM), [ICBM] Super High Frequency Satellite Terminal (ISST) and [UHF] voice radio communication systems." By 2011, the Minimum Essential Emergency Communications Network was being modernized in the Nuclear Command and Control System. By February 2012, USSTRATCOM was using the Integrated Strategic Planning and Analysis Network (ISPAN), and the USSTRATCOM Replacement Facility Fit-Out (PE 0303255F) was to "include secure HEMP-Shielded Command and Control Center, mainframe computer data centers, multiple 24/7 mission operations centers, storage and maintenance areas, labs/workrooms, back-up generators, Uninterruptible Power Source, Technical Control Facility, Fiber Ring, [with funding] beginning in FY13."

== Age of system and planned replacement ==
A Government Accountability Office report on aging and outdated "legacy systems" used by the federal government published in 2016 noted that the SACCS was one of the oldest federal IT investments, running on 1970s-era IBM Series/1 software and 8-inch floppy disks. The report noted that the Department of Defense "plans to update its data storage solutions, port expansion processors, portable terminals, and desktop terminals by the end of fiscal year 2017."
