= Emergency communications network =

An emergency communications network is designed to provide reliable communications during an emergency.

The term may refer to a military network, such as:

- Ground Wave Emergency Network
- Minimum Essential Emergency Communications Network

Emergency communication networks may also be used for notifying the public of emergencies requiring action.

- NOAA Weather Radio
- Emergency Alert System
- Emergency Public Warning System
- National Severe Weather Warning Service

It also may refer to a network established by civil authorities, with or without volunteer help:

- Emergency communications center
- Amateur radio emergency communications
- Emergency communication system

Frequently, a previously established Emergency communications center provides dispatching of Emergency services and Emergency operations center capabilities during a severe disaster. In the United States, dialing 911 is the most frequent method of contacting the dispatch personnel.
