= SLFC =

SLFC may refer to:

- Shillong Lajong FC, an Indian football club
- South Liverpool F.C.
- South Liverpool F.C. (1890s)
- Staines & Lammas (Middlesex) F.C., an English football club
- St. Louis Film Critics, film organization
- St Luke's F.C.

== See also ==
- SLFCS
