= Operation Looking Glass =

American command and control center

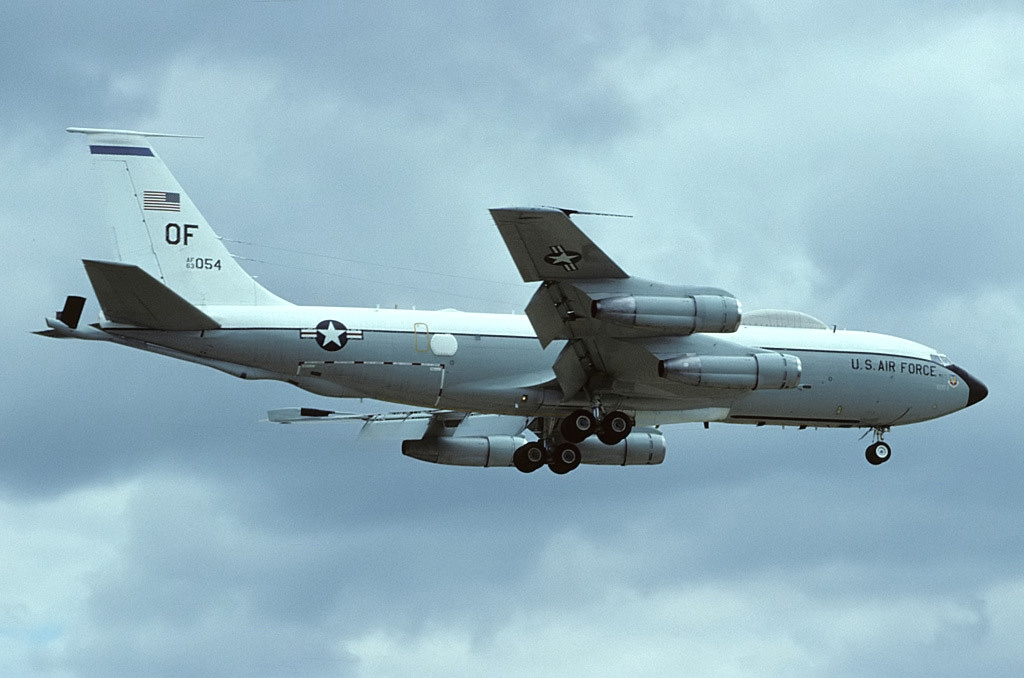
A Boeing EC-135C Looking Glass

Looking Glass (or Operation Looking Glass) is the historic code name for an airborne command and control center operated by the United States. Since 2016 it has been referred to as the ABNCP (Airborne National Command Post). It provides command and control of U.S. nuclear forces in the event that ground-based command centers have been destroyed or otherwise rendered inoperable.

In such an event, the general officer aboard the Looking Glass serves as the Airborne Emergency Action Officer (AEAO), and by law assumes the authority of the National Command Authority and could command execution of nuclear attacks. The AEAO is supported by a battle staff of approximately 20 people, with another dozen responsible for the operation of the aircraft systems. The name Looking Glass, which is another name for a mirror, was chosen for the Airborne Command Post because the mission operates in parallel with the underground command post at Offutt Air Force Base.

== History ==
The code name "Looking Glass" came from the aircraft's ability to "mirror" the command and control functions of the underground command post at the U.S. Air Force's Strategic Air Command (SAC) headquarters at Offutt AFB, Nebraska.

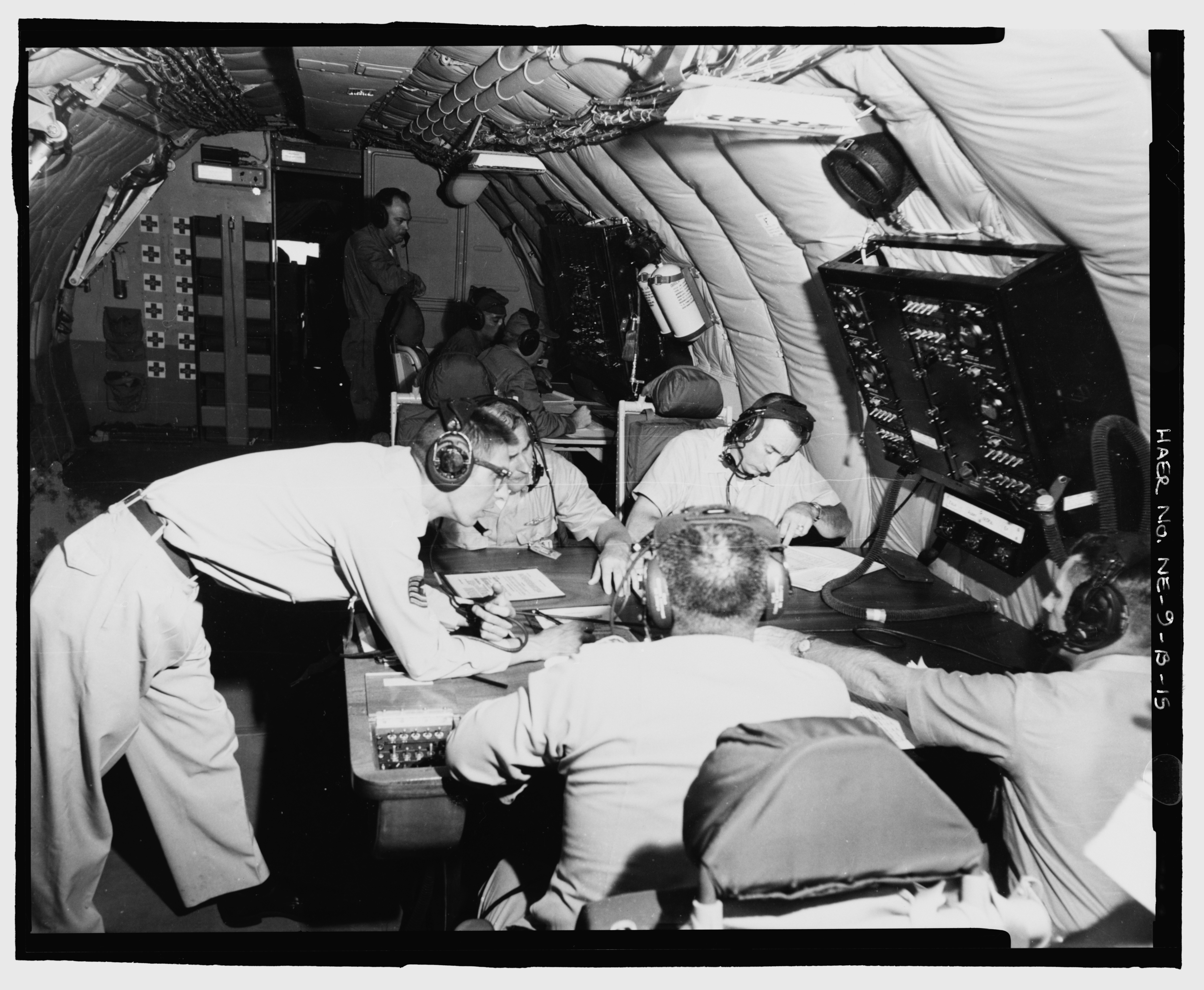
Early Looking Glass battle staff

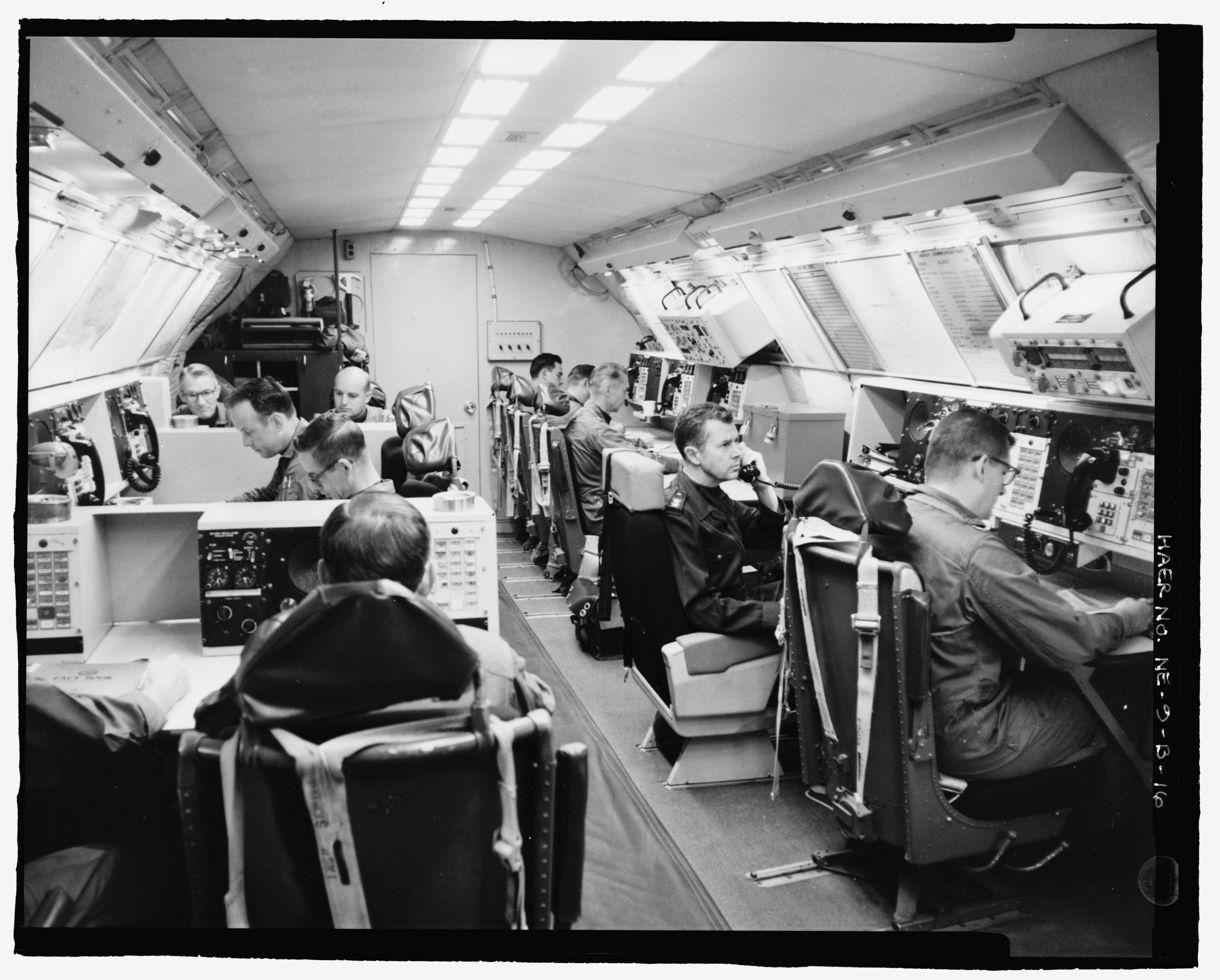
Looking Glass battle staff, 1973

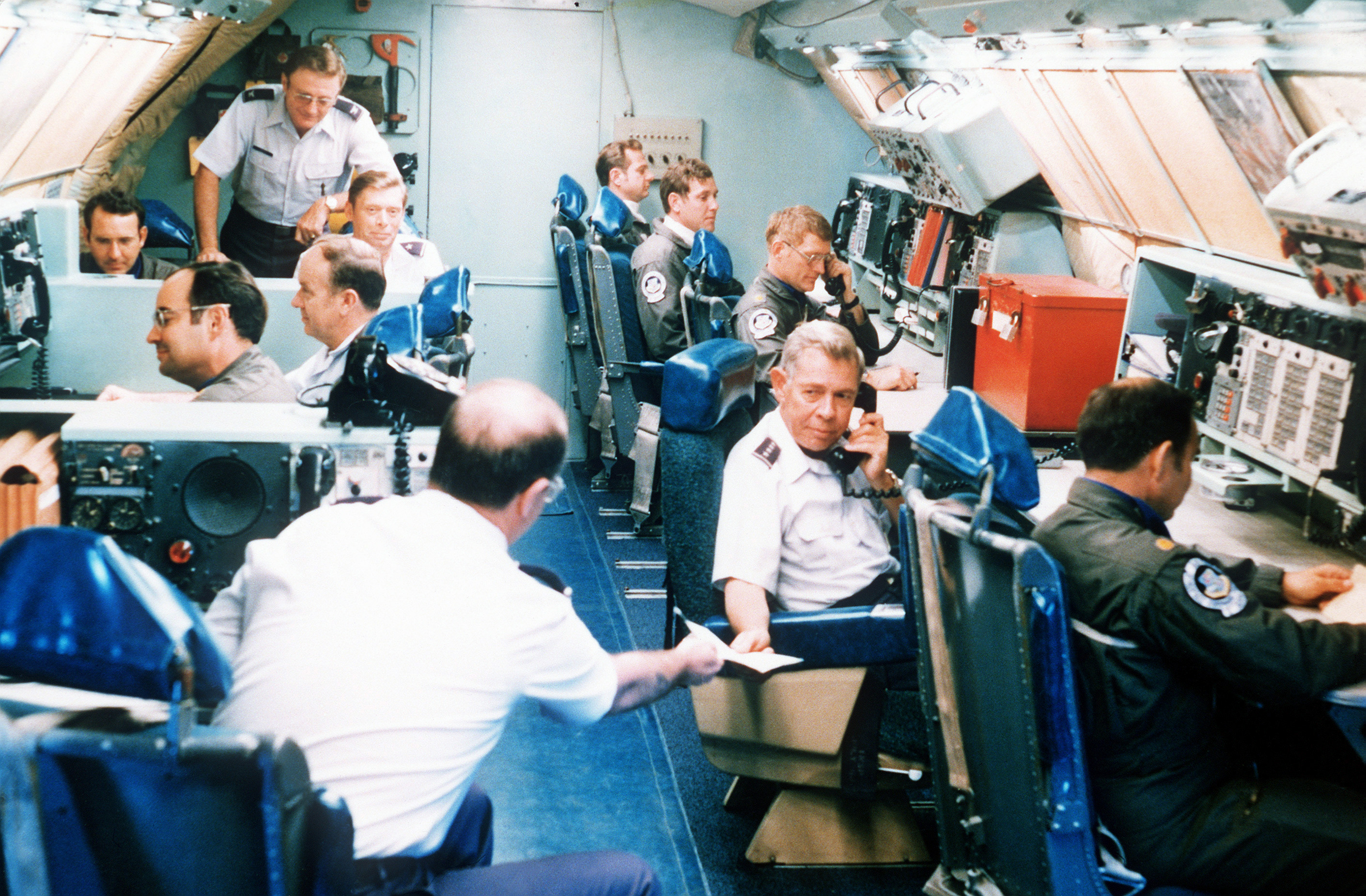
Gen. Richard Ellis, CINCSAC, in battle staff compartment, 1979

In 1960, the SAC Airborne Command Post or "Looking Glass" was initiated, with the conversion of 5 (6 but 1 was reverted ) KC-135A tankers to Airborne Command Posts. In July 1960, operational testing began under the code name Looking Glass, with a SAC general officer always aboard each flight, and operated by the 34th Air Refueling Squadron at Offutt AFB.

In August 1966, the mission transferred to the 38th Strategic Reconnaissance Squadron, to the 2nd Airborne Command and Control Squadron in April 1970, to the 7th Airborne Command and Control Squadron in July 1994, and to the USSTRATCOM's Strategic Communications Wing One in October 1998.

In February 1961, the Strategic Air Command put Looking Glass mission on continuous airborne alert. Aircraft from the 34th Air Refueling Squadron were based at its headquarters at Offutt AFB, backed up by aircraft flying with the Second Air Force / 913th Air Refueling Squadron at Barksdale AFB, Louisiana, the Eighth Air Force / 99th Air Refueling Squadron at Westover AFB, Massachusetts, and the Fifteenth Air Force / 22d Air Refueling Squadron, March AFB, California.

EC-135 Looking Glass aircraft were airborne 24 hours a day for over 29 years, until July 24, 1990, when "The Glass" ceased continuous airborne alert, but remained on ground or airborne alert 24 hours a day.

The Looking Glass mission mirrors ground-based command, control, and communications (C3 or C³) located at the USSTRATCOM Global Operations Center (GOC) at Offutt AFB. The EC-135 Looking Glass aircraft were equipped with the Airborne Launch Control System, capable of transmitting launch commands to U.S. ground-based intercontinental ballistic missiles (ICBMs) in the event that the ground launch control centers were rendered inoperable.

The Looking Glass was also designed to help ensure continuity and reconstitution of the US government in the event of a nuclear attack on North America. Although the two types of aircraft are distinct, the Doomsday Plane nickname is also frequently associated with the Boeing E-4 "Nightwatch" Advanced Airborne Command Post mission and aircraft.

The Looking Glass was the anchor in the World Wide Airborne Command Post (WWABNCP) network. This network of specially equipped EC-135 aircraft launched from ground alert status, and established air-to-air wireless network connections in the event of a U.S. national emergency. Members of the WWABNCP network included:

1. Operation Silk Purse, for the Commander in Chief, U.S. European Command (USCINCEUR), based at RAF Mildenhall in the United Kingdom (callsign Seabell)
2. Operation "Scope Light", for the Commander in Chief, U.S. Atlantic Command (CINCLANT), based at Langley AFB, VA
3. Operation "Blue Eagle", for the Commander in Chief, U.S. Pacific Command (USCINCPAC), based at Hickam AFB, HI
4. Operation "Nightwatch", which supported the President of the United States, and were based at Andrews AFB, Maryland. In the early 1970s the E-4A aircraft replaced the EC-135Js on this mission.

The Eastern Auxiliary (EAST Aux) and Western Auxiliary (West Aux) Command Posts were also part of the WWABNCP ("wah-bin-cop") network and were capable of assuming responsibility for Looking Glass as the anchor. The West Aux 906th Air Refueling Squadron was based at Minot AFB, North Dakota, and moved to the 4th Airborne Command and Control Squadron at Ellsworth AFB, South Dakota in April 1970.

The East Aux mission 301st Air Refueling Squadron was based at Lockbourne AFB, Ohio. In April 1970, the role moved to the 3rd Airborne Command & Control Squadron at Grissom AFB, Indiana. After 1975, East Aux was assumed from the Looking Glass backup ground alert aircraft launched from Offutt AFB.

In June 1992, United States Strategic Command took over the Looking Glass mission from the Strategic Air Command, as SAC was disbanded and Strategic Command assumed the nuclear deterrence mission.

== Current status ==
In October 1998, the United States Navy fleet of E-6Bs replaced the EC-135C in performing the "Looking Glass" mission, previously carried out for 37 years by the U.S. Air Force. Unlike the original Looking Glass aircraft, the E-6Bs are modified Boeing 707 aircraft, not the military-only KC-135. The E-6B provides the National Command Authority with the same capability as the EC-135 fleet to control the nation's intercontinental ballistic missile (ICBM) force, nuclear-capable bombers and submarine-launched ballistic missiles (SLBM). With the assumption of this mission, a USSTRATCOM battle staff now flies with the TACAMO crew.

If the USSTRATCOM Global Operations Center (GOC) is unable to function in its role, the E-6B Looking Glass can assume command of all U.S. nuclear-capable forces. Flying aboard each ABNCP is a crew of 22, which includes an air crew, a Communications Systems Officer and team, an Airborne Emergency Action Officer (an Admiral or General officer), a Mission Commander, a Strike Advisor, an Airborne Launch Control System/Intelligence Officer, a Meteorological Effects Officer, a Logistics Officer, a Force Status Controller, and an Emergency Actions NCO.

In addition to being able to direct the launch of ICBMs using the Airborne Launch Control System, the E-6B can communicate Emergency Action Messages (EAM) to nuclear submarines running at depth, by extending a two and a half-mile-long (4 km) trailing wire antenna (TWA) for use with the Survivable Low Frequency Communications System (SLFCS), as the EC-135C could.

There was some speculation that the "mystery plane" seen flying over the White House on September 11, 2001, was some newer incarnation of Looking Glass. However, the plane circling the White House on 9/11 was a E-4B (callsign ADDIS77/VENUS77) acting as the tertiary NAOC (Nightwatch) aircraft which was launched from ground alert at Andrews Air Force Base.

== See also ==
- TACAMO
- Boeing EC-135
- Boeing E-4 Advanced Airborne Command Post ("Nightwatch")
- E-6 Mercury
- Airborne Launch Control System
- Airborne Launch Control Center
- Decapitation strike
- Letters of last resort
- Dead Hand (Perimeter)
- Continuity of Operations Plan
- Single Integrated Operational Plan
- Nuclear utilization target selection
