= Silver Creek Communications Annex =

- Interactive map of the Silver Creek Communications Annex area

General information
- Status: Demolished
- Type: Mast radiator insulated against ground
- Location: Silver Creek, Nebraska, United States
- Coordinates: 41°20′46″N 97°43′16″W
- Destroyed: 1995

Height
- Height: 373.7 m (1,226.05 ft)

Design and construction
- Main contractor: US Air Force

Silver Creek Communications Annex was a 373.7 meters (1226 ft) tall guyed mast used by the USAF Survivable Low Frequency Communications System Site, which was built near Silver Creek, Nebraska at 41°20′46″N 97°43′18″W . Detachment 1, 33d Communications Squadron, 1st Aerospace Communications Group (later 55th Communications Group) out of Offutt AFB, ran the site until its inactivation.

== History ==
The SAC SLFCS site at Silver Creek was built as a project assigned to the 32d Communications Squadron. The site was accepted by Headquarters USAF on 29 July 1968, and was activated for continuous operations on 19 August 1968. on 5 September 1968, operational testing began at Silver Creek.

== Facility ==
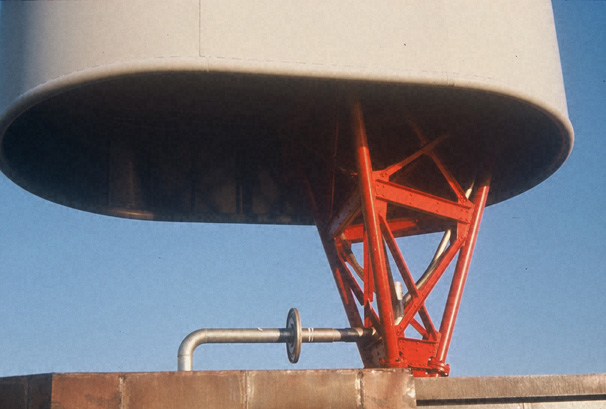
Base of antenna

Silver Creek's radio tower was a mast radiator insulated against ground, which provided VLF communication to ground and mobile nuclear missile facilities during the Cold War. It transmitted at a maximum power of 110 kW. The facility was partially built into the ground and was designed to withstand a moderate nuclear blast from a distance of 10 miles (16 km). The facility was self-sustaining and employed a sophisticated ventilation system as well as backup diesel generators.

== See also ==
- Strategic Air Command
- Post Attack Command and Control System
- Survivable Low Frequency Communications System
- Hawes Radio Tower - sister facility in California
