= Hawes Radio Relay Site =

Hawes Radio Tower
- Interactive map of the Hawes Radio Tower area

General information
- Status: Destroyed
- Type: Mast radiator insulated against ground
- Location: Hinkley, California, United States
- Coordinates: 34°55′1″N 117°22′36″W
- Destroyed: 1986

Height
- Height: 373.7 m (1,226.05 ft)

Design and construction
- Main contractor: US Air Force

Hawes Radio Relay Facility (also known as the Hawes Radio Tower) was a United States Air Force installation built on the site of the former Hawes Airfield at Hinkley, California, USA at 34°55′1″N 117°22′36″W. The site contained a 373.7-meter-tall (1,226 ft) guyed mast antenna and hardened underground facility used for the Strategic Air Command's AN/FRC-117 Survivable Low Frequency Communications System. Detachment 2, 33rd Communications Group at March AFB, ran the site until its inactivation in 1986.

== Mission ==
The mission of Detachment 2 (Hawes Radio Relay Site) was to provide the Joint Chiefs of Staff, the Commander-in-Chief of Strategic Air Command (CINCSAC), SAC Headquarters, the Airborne Command Post (ABNCP), and the SAC Force with a Survivable Low Frequency Communications System for passing record communications between the above agencies. Hawes provided SAC Emergency War Order communications before, during and after a potential nuclear attack, acted as the alternate ground station for the SAC ABNCP, and relayed secure record communications with the Automatic Digital Network (AUTODIN).

== History ==
=== Activation ===
The SAC SLFCS site at Hawes was activated on 3 Apr 1967 as a project assigned to the 33d Communications Squadron, Air Force. The site was accepted by Headquarters USAF on 31 May 1968, and was activated for continuous operations a day later. On 19 Jul 1968, 15th Air Force assumed maintenance responsibility. Hawes was located in the Mojave Desert, approximately 100 miles northeast of March AFB, and 40 miles east of Edwards AFB. Site personnel lived on Edwards AFB, and took a shuttle bus to the site.

=== Deactivation ===
During the Fiscal Year 1987-1991 Program Objective Memorandum development, Headquarters SAC, determined Hawes was no longer needed to perform the SLFCS mission. HQ SAC Program Directive 01-85, titled "Hawes SLFCS Transmitter Site Deactivation", outlined the steps needed to shut the site down. On 30 September 1986, at 1601 local time (1 Oct 1986, 0001Z), the main power breaker for the transmitter was permanently turned off. Minutes before, Hawes transmitted one final SLFCS message, commemorating its 18 years of operation.

== Facility ==
Hawes Radio Tower was a mast radiator insulated against ground, which provided VLF communication to ground and mobile nuclear missile facilities during the Cold War. It transmitted at a maximum power of 100 kW. The facility was partially built into the ground and was designed to withstand a moderate nuclear blast at a distance of 10 miles (16 km). The facility was self-sustaining and employed a sophisticated ventilation system and backup diesel generators.

== Post USAF operations ==
In the mid-1980s, the site was given up, and in 1986, the mast was demolished by explosives. The two-story bunker, left abandoned, became a popular hang-out site for local teenagers. It also became a center for wild and sometimes violent parties. The interior was blackened from numerous bonfires and riddled with graffiti. In addition, holes and debris created by the radio tower demolition, as well as standing water in the basement after rains, made navigating the dark interior of the bunker extremely dangerous.

The bunker was demolished by the Bureau of Land Management and Air Force in April–May 2008 after two local teenagers, Christopher Cody Thompson of Apple Valley and Bodhisattva "Bodhi" Sherzer-Potter of Helendale, were found murdered in the bunker on 5 January after a robbery attempt. Collin Lee McGlaughlin was convicted and sentenced to life in prison without parole for the murder. A second defendant, Cameron Thomson, 22, also of Covina, pleaded guilty to two counts of voluntary manslaughter and two counts of attempted robbery after agreeing to a plea bargain and was sentenced to 15 years. A third suspect, David Brian Smith, was sentenced to 50 years to life in 2016.

== See also ==
- Strategic Air Command
- Post Attack Command and Control System
- Survivable Low Frequency Communications System
- Silver Creek Communications Annex - sister site to Hawes, located in Silver Creek, Nebraska

== Photo gallery ==
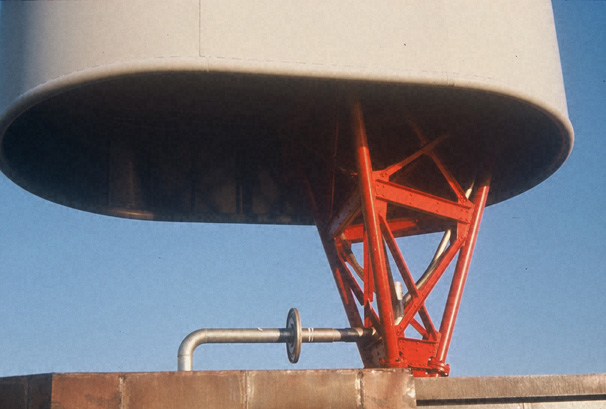
Base of antenna
