= Primary Alert System =

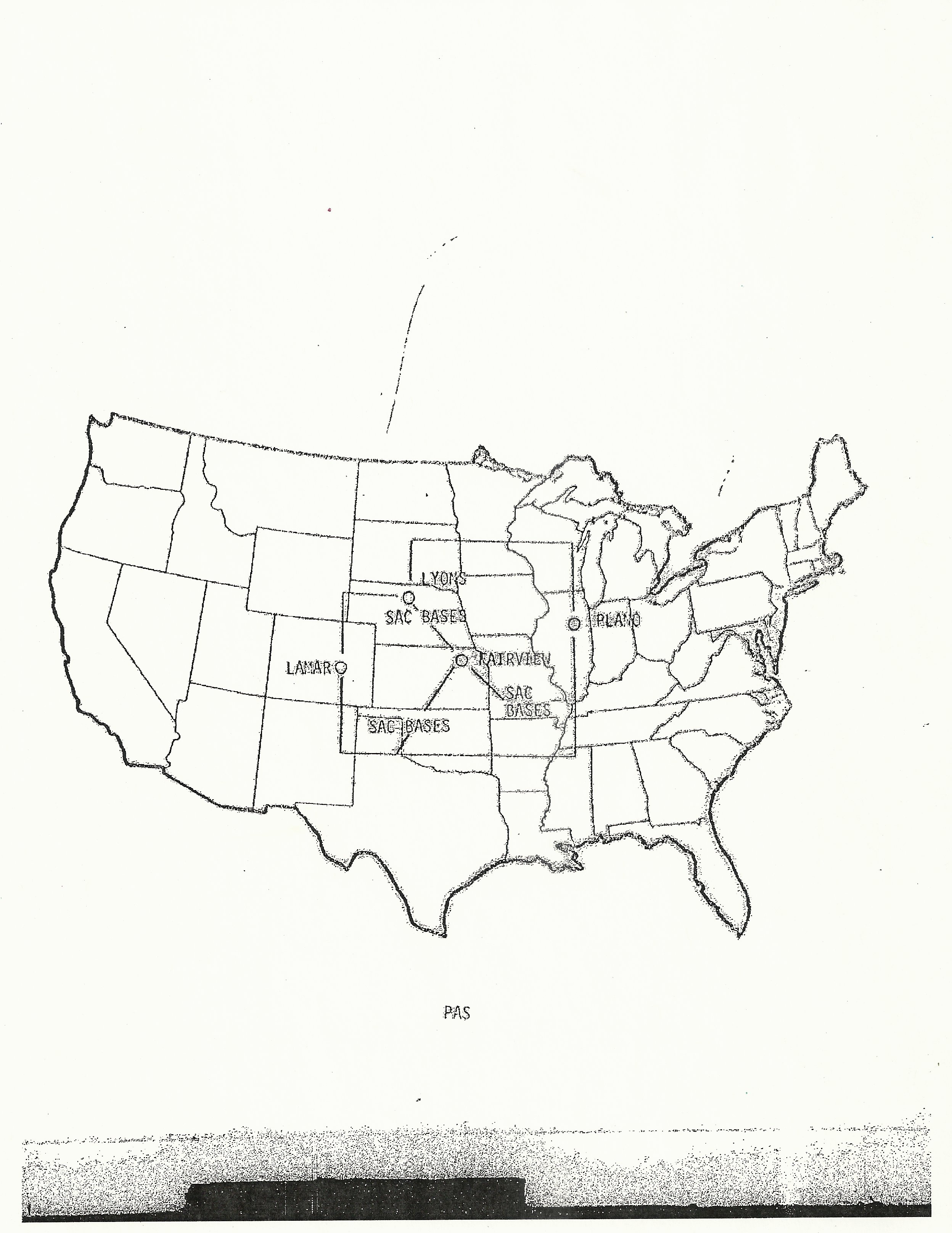
SAC Primary Alert System laydown

The Primary Alerting System (PAS), was a network of land-line connections used by the Strategic Air Command (SAC) for command and control of its nuclear forces. PAS provided immediate and simultaneous voice communications to all (SAC) unit command posts and missile launch control facilities.

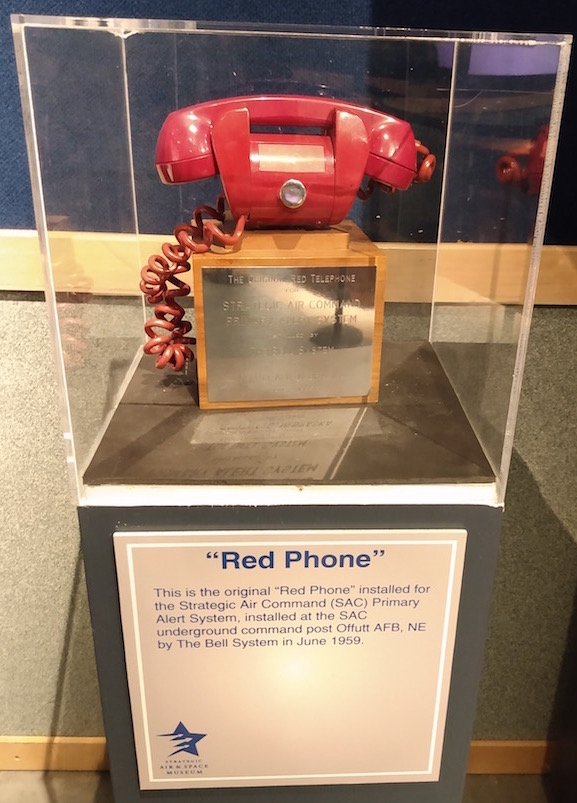
Original "Red Phone" for the SAC PAS. Installed by the Bell System at the Offutt AFB underground command post in June 1959. Now on display at the SAC museum.

PAS reached each Command Post by two geographically diversified circuits; one circuit, commonly called the "front-door" circuit tied the unit directly to Headquarters (SAC); the other, or "back-door" circuit provided a link to the parent Numbered Air Force.

== See also ==
- Post Attack Command and Control System (PACCS)
- Airborne Launch Control System (ALCS)
- Ground Wave Emergency Network (GWEN)
- Minimum Essential Emergency Communications Network (MEECN)
- Survivable Low Frequency Communications System (SLFCS)
