= Missile combat crew =

Team in charge of an ICBM station

A missile combat crew (MCC), is a team of highly trained specialists, often called missilemen, or missileers, staffing Intermediate Range and Intercontinental ballistic missile systems (IRBMs and ICBMs, respectively). In the United States, personnel, officially coded as Nuclear and Missile Operations Officers (AFSC 13NX), of the United States Air Force, operate underground missile systems at launch control centers located throughout the country. There are also a select few missileers that have the chance to become part of a Missile Combat Crew-Airborne (MCC-A) operating the Airborne Launch Control System which provides a survivable launch capability for the Minuteman ICBM force. Crew size varies among the different missile systems, but the number is always greater than one, to abide by USSTRATCOM's two-man rule for positive control of nuclear weapons.

== Origins ==
The first missile combat crews were composed of trained aviators (e.g., B-47, B-36), but later generations had no aviation experience and were "grown" to be missileers from the start of their careers.

From the early days of United States missile crew operations until the late 1970s, the career field was closed to female personnel. Changes were implemented to allow for full female crews on both Titan II and Minuteman/Peacekeeper crews. In 1978 the restriction of having women on crew was lifted for the Titan ICBM. Recognizing the limitations in personnel scheduling, Strategic Air Command relieved restrictions on same-sex crew pairings, into "mixed" crews on January 1, 1988.

== Training ==
Combat crew training consisted of three phases, Undergraduate Missile Training (UMT), Unit Qualification Training (or Unit Orientation Training), and recurring training.

UMT was performed by the 4315th Combat Crew Training Squadron/392d Training Squadron at Vandenberg AFB, California and lasted 13 weeks. UQT/UOT was held at the missile base(s) the personnel was assigned to, and conducted by local instructors, lasting three or four weeks. Recurring training happened continually on a monthly basis, and was conducted by local instructors.

== Locations ==
Locations of United States missile launch complexes varied by system. Most launch control centers were built in population-sparse locations, such as the Northern Tier (Washington, Wyoming, Idaho, Montana, North Dakota), Midwest (Kansas, Missouri, South Dakota, Colorado) and the Southwest (Arizona, Texas, New Mexico). Titan II sites were supported by Little Rock AFB in Arkansas, Davis-Monthan AFB in Arizona, and McConnell AFB in Kansas. 18 Titan II Missile sites were supported by each base. Each missile complex was organized near a missile support base (MSB). Crews would gather on the base, receive briefings and equipment, and travel out to their alert location by either truck or helicopter.

== Working environment ==
The missile launch control environment also varied by system. Early missiles such as Thor and Atlas, relied on support facilities above ground, with crews protected in a shelter of some sort. Later systems were buried underground, either with the missiles located nearby (i.e. Titan) or a distance away (Peacekeeper, Minuteman). In the underground environment, crews dealt with artificial lighting, recycled air, loud noises, and intimately close quarters (in Minuteman and Peacekeeper) with equipment racks. The Atlas F was in an underground silo, along with the launch crew quarters, separated by a tunnel.

== Alert tours ==
Peacekeeper and Titan II alerts were usually 24-hour tours, with additional time required for briefings at the MSB, and travel time to and from site. Minuteman crews were on 40 hour alerts with additional time required for briefings at the MSB, and travel time to and from site. An experiment with 72-hour tours was started in 2006 but was ended sometime later for unknown reasons.

=== Project OIL CHANGE ===
OIL CHANGE was a test implemented by SAC to test if two-person 36-hour tours for Minuteman ICBM crews were feasible; before OIL CHANGE, three crew members were needed (MCCC, DMCCC, Alternate MCCC). The test ended in mid-1968, with the OIL CHANGE recommendations implemented 29 November 1968.

== System specifics ==
Each missile crew had at least two officers on-site operating the equipment: the missile combat crew commander (MCCC) and deputy missile combat crew commander (DMCCC). The earlier systems, such as Atlas, Thor and Titan, required more personnel to monitor increasingly complex systems (as listed below).

=== Atlas ===
The Atlas-F silo-based variant had a crew complement of five members:

- MCCC
- DMCCC
- Ballistic Missile Analyst Technician (BMAT)
- Missile Facilities Technician (MFT)
- Electric Power Production Technician (EPPT)

=== Titan ===
Titan II crews numbered four:

- MCCC
- DMCCC
- Ballistic Missile Analyst Technician (BMAT)
- Missile Facilities Technician (MFT).

=== Minuteman/Peacekeeper ===
Minuteman and Peacekeeper missile crews numbered two: the MCCC and DMCCC. Tasks within the system technical orders were sometimes labeled for each crew position, although the majority of tasks could be accomplished by either member.

=== Airborne Launch Control System ===
The Airborne Launch Control System is operated by an airborne missileer crew aboard Airborne Launch Control Center aircraft. The Missile Combat Crew-Airborne consists of the Missile Combat Crew Command-Airborne (MCCC-A) and the Deputy Missile Combat Crew Commander-Airborne (DMCCC-A).

== Global counterparts ==
=== Soviet/Russian ===
Very little is publicly known about Soviet/Russian missile crew members. Following Soviet doctrine, launch control functions are entrusted to higher-ranking officers (lieutenant colonel equivalents), in contrast to United States policy of entrusting lower-ranking officers (captains and lieutenants) with day-to-day functions.

=== French ===
Little is publicly known about the French ICBM system, including personnel issues. The land-based deterrent, consisting of Hadès and SSBS S3D missiles was deactivated by President Jacques Chirac in February 1996.

=== China ===
Nothing is publicly known about Chinese ICBM personnel or their activities.

== Photo gallery ==
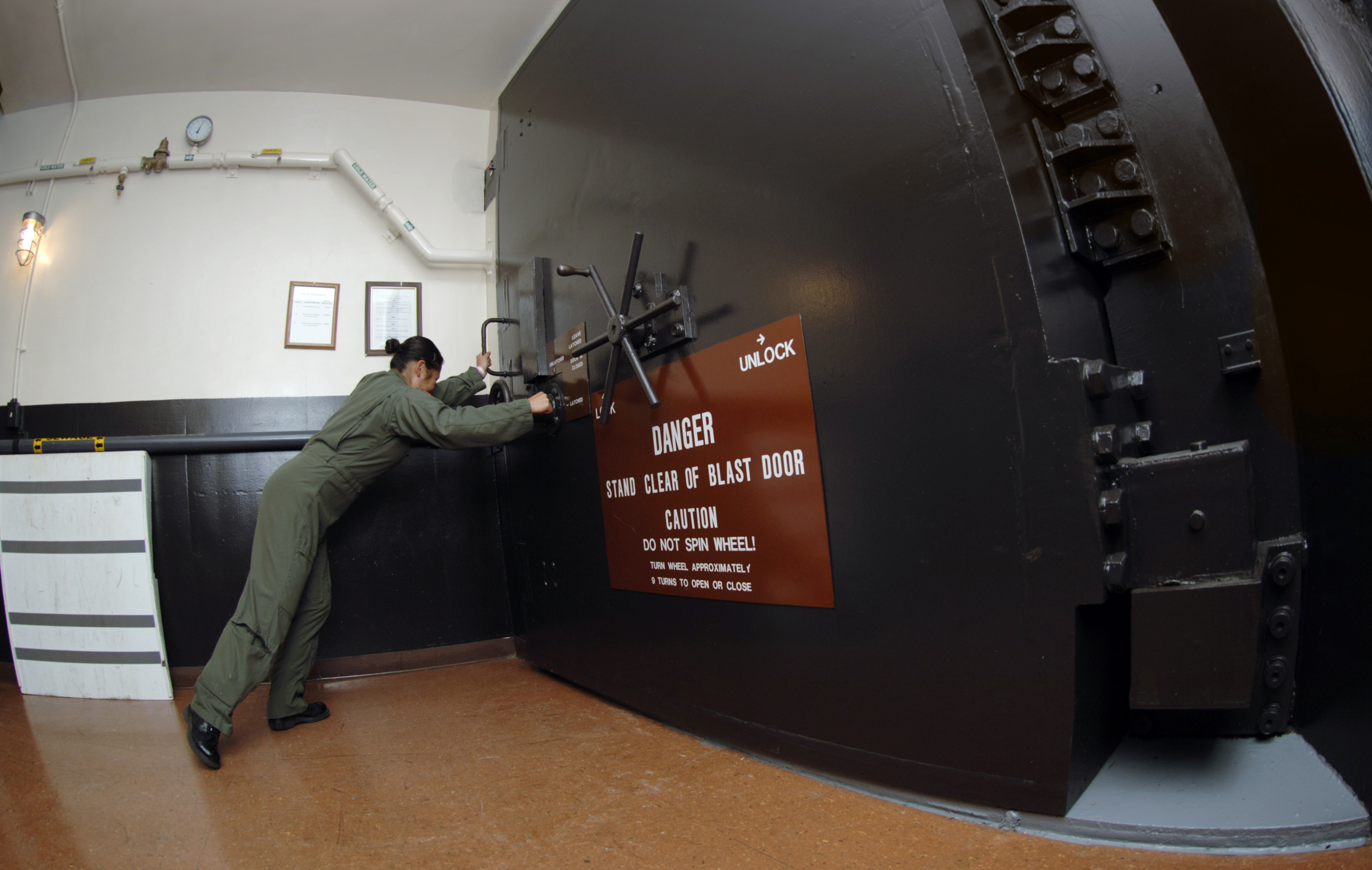
Missile crew member opens blast door

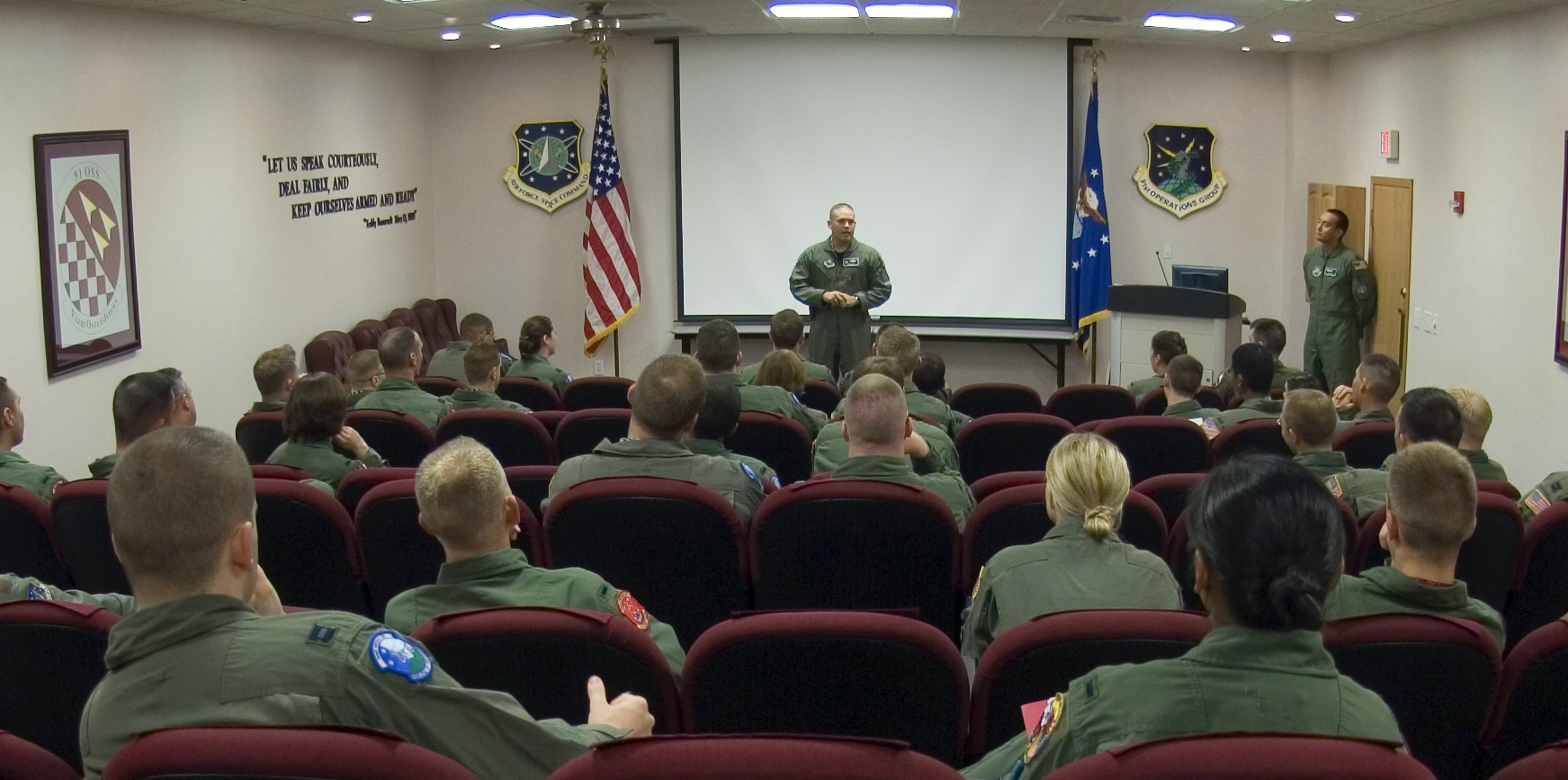
Briefing of 91st Missile Wing crews

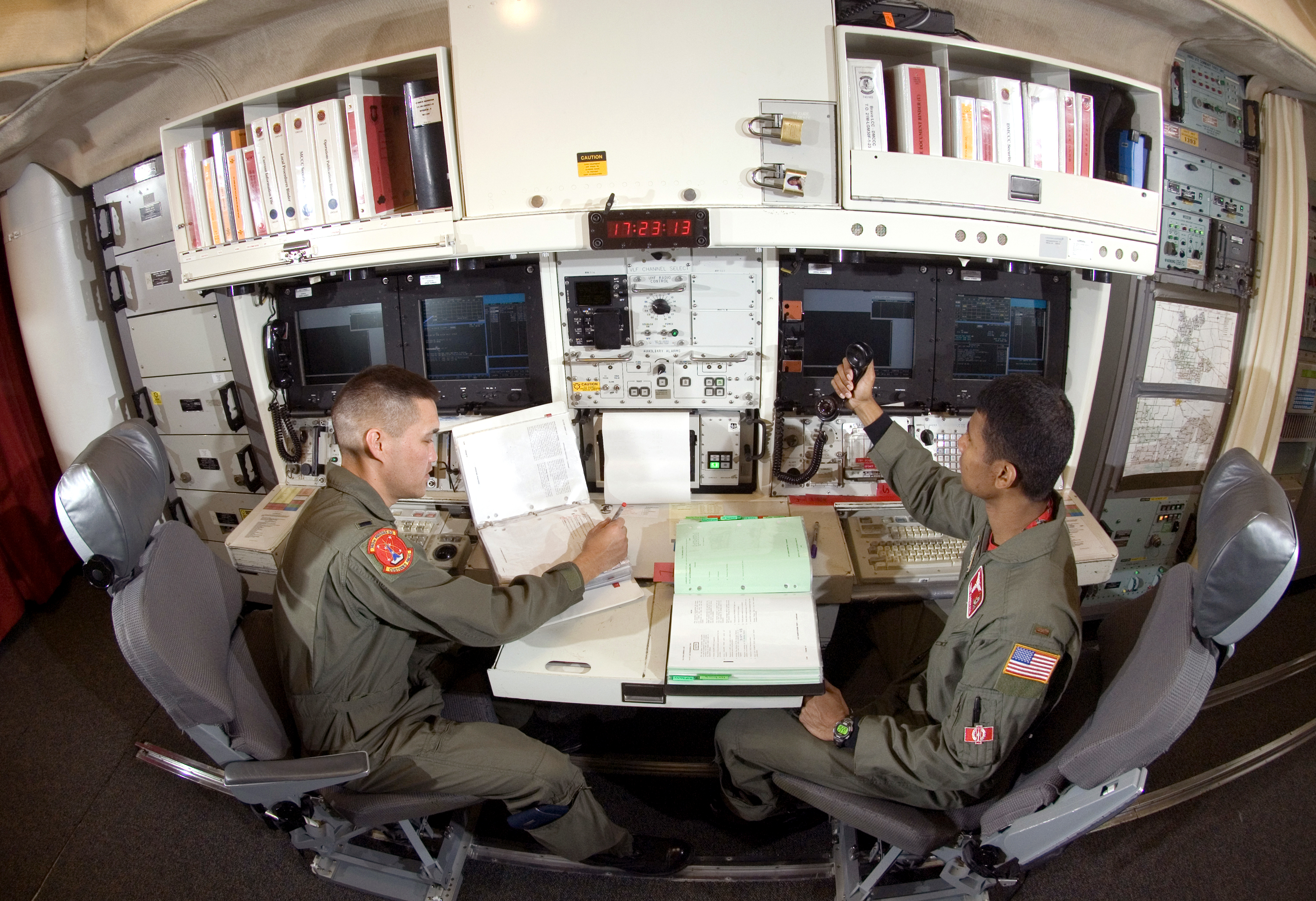
Minuteman crew on alert

== See also ==
- Air Force Global Strike Command
- LGM-30 Minuteman
- Missile Badge
- Missile launch control center
