= Emergency Action Message =

Nuclear weapon control system

In the United States military's strategic nuclear weapon nuclear command and control (NC2) system, an Emergency Action Message (EAM) is a preformatted message that directs nuclear-capable forces to execute specific Major Attack Options (MAOs) or Limited Attack Options (LAOs) in a nuclear war. They are the military commands that the US military chain of command would use to launch a nuclear strike. Individual countries or specific regions may be included or withheld in the EAM, as specified in the Single Integrated Operational Plan (SIOP). The SIOP was updated annually until February 2003, when it was replaced by Operations Plan (OPLAN) 8044. Since July 2012, the US nuclear war plan has been OPLAN 8010-12, Strategic Deterrence and Force Employment.

== Overview ==
EAMs use cryptographic protocols (including such methods as digital signatures) to authenticate the messages, thereby ensuring that they cannot be forged or altered.

In the United States, the EAM will be issued from the National Military Command Center (NMCC) at the Pentagon or, if it has been destroyed by an enemy first strike, by the Alternate National Military Command Center - Site R at Raven Rock, Pennsylvania or by the U.S. Air Force E-4B Nightwatch aircraft/U.S. Navy E-6A Mercury aircraft (TACAMO).

The messages are sent in digital format to nuclear-capable major commands. The messages are then relayed to aircraft that are on alert by the U.S. Strategic Command at Offutt Air Force Base in Omaha, Nebraska, via single-sideband modulation radio transmitters of the High Frequency Global Communications System (formerly known as the Global High Frequency System). The EAM is relayed to missile-firing nuclear submarines via special transmitters designed for communication with submarines. The transmitters include those designed to operate at Very Low Frequency (VLF). The submarines pick up the message via special antennas. Nuclear-capable forces will then be expected to carry out an EAM without fail. Crewed bombers may be recalled, but missiles fired from land-based silos or from submarines cannot be recalled.

== Skyking messages ==
Skyking messages, also known as "Foxtrot Broadcasts", are also read on the same network as EAMs. These messages will interrupt an EAM if needed to be read. They contain a higher priority and time-sensitive code for orders that need immediate attention.

== See also ==
- Gold Codes
- Nuclear football
- Emergency Action Notification
