= Minimum Essential Emergency Communications Network =

Uninterrupted communications network during nuclear war

The Minimum Essential Emergency Communications Network (MEECN) is a network of systems providing uninterrupted communications throughout the pre-, trans-, and post-nuclear warfare environment. At minimum, MEECN is designed to provide a one-way flow of information to activate nuclear forces during severe jamming and a post-nuclear environment.

== Components ==
As of 1994, MEECN consists of various programs: Miniature Receive Terminals (MRTs) for nuclear bombers, High Power Transmit Sets (HPTS) for E-4B aircraft, Dual Frequency MEECN receivers (DFMRs) for ICBM Launch Control Centers.

=== Ground Element MEECN System (GEMS) ===
The GEMS program, short for Ground Element Minimum Essential Emergency Communications Network, is intended to replace deprecated communications facilities. This system features improved infrastructure for alerting aircrew, and maintaining communications in the event of nuclear conflict. Notable elements include updated Extremely High Frequency (EHF) communications satellites, and redundant Very Low Frequency (VLF) communication paths for strategic message traffic. The changes will resolve problems associated with aging or ineffective devices such as pagers, klaxons, and Emergency Action Message (EAM) processing systems.

=== Minuteman MEECN Program (MMP) ===
The Minuteman MEECN Program (MMP) replaced the aging Survivable Low Frequency Communications System (SLFCS) Launch Control Centers (LCCs) with an Extremely High Frequency (EHF) and Very Low Frequency/Low Frequency (VLF/LF) communications equipment.

MMP consists of EHF Milstar and VLF/LF communications equipment.

The 91st Missile Wing's Oscar-01 at Minot AFB, North Dakota was the last Minuteman Launch Control Center to have updated to the MMP configuration.

== See also ==
- Post-Attack Command and Control System (PACCS)
- Airborne Launch Control System (ALCS)
- Ground Wave Emergency Network (GWEN)
- Survivable Low Frequency Communications System (SLFCS)
