= AN/URC-117 Ground Wave Emergency Network =

U.S. government command and control communications system

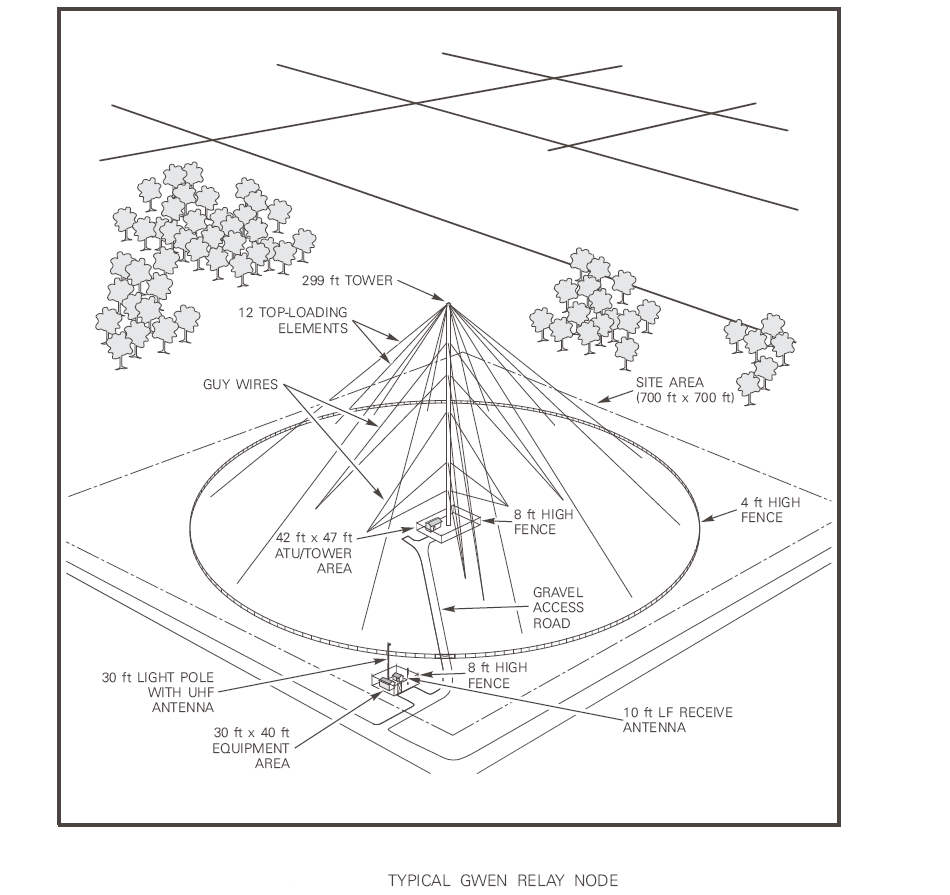
Diagram of a GWEN relay node.

The Ground Wave Emergency Network (GWEN) was a US Air Force command and control communications system, deployed briefly between 1992 and 1994, intended for use by the United States government to facilitate military communications before, during and after a nuclear war. Specifically, the GWEN network was intended to survive the effects of an electromagnetic pulse from a high-altitude nuclear explosion and ensure that the United States President or their survivors could issue a launch order to Strategic Air Command bombers by radio.

In accordance with the Joint Electronics Type Designation System (JETDS), the "AN/URC-117" designation represents the 117th design of an Army-Navy electronic device for general utility two-way radio system. The JETDS system also now is used to name all Department of Defense electronic systems.

Each GWEN Relay Node site featured a longwave transmitting tower, generally between 290 and 299 feet (88 and 91 m) tall, and emitting an RF output of between 2,000 and 3,000 watts. Of 240 planned GWEN towers, only 58 were built. In 1994, a defense appropriations bill banned the funding of new GWEN tower construction, and a few months later, the GWEN program was cancelled by the US Air Force. The United States Coast Guard later outfitted a number of former GWEN sites to house the Nationwide Differential GPS system.

== History ==
GWEN was part of the Strategic Modernization Program designed to upgrade the nation's strategic communication system, thereby strengthening the value of nuclear deterrence. The GWEN communication system, established in the late 1980s, was designed to transmit critical Emergency Action Messages (EAM) to United States nuclear forces. EMP can produce a sudden power surge over a widespread area that could overload unprotected electronic equipment and render it inoperable. In addition, EMP could interfere with radio transmissions that use the ionosphere for propagation. It was thought that GWEN would use a ground-hugging wave for propagation and so be unaffected by the EMP. The network was conceived as an array of approximately 240 radio transceivers distributed across the continental USA which operated in the Low frequency (LF) radio band.

Analysis showed that low-frequency (150-190 kilohertz) radio transmissions were largely unaffected by high-altitude EMP, and the Air Force Weapons Laboratory (Kirtland Air Force Base) tested a small scale 'groundwave' transmission system in 1978-1982. Based on the groundwave concept's promise, USAF Headquarters issued a draft Program Management Directive (PMD) for a "Proliferated Groundwave Communications System (PGCS)" on 25 August 1981. The name of this proposed network system was changed from PGCS to Groundwave Emergency Network in February 1982 The first major phase of construction was called the "thin line" which began in 1985. The Air Force placed a tentative initial operating capability for GWEN by January 1992.

Protests from citizen activists led to elected officials rejecting GWEN. This included organized opposition from a national group called the GWEN Project, headquartered in Amherst, Massachusetts.

When doubts arose regarding the threat of electromagnetic pulse to permanently shut down communications, only 58 of the originally planned 240 GWEN towers were built. In 1994 a defense appropriations bill banned new towers from being built, and shortly after, the GWEN program was cancelled by the Air Force.

== Operations ==
Command and control messages originating at various military installations were transmitted on the 225 to 400 MHz band and received by a network of unmanned relay stations, called "Relay Nodes", dispersed throughout the contiguous 48 states. The Relay Nodes would re-transmit these command and control messages to each other, and to Strategic Air Command operating locations and launch control centers using low frequencies in the 150-175 kHz range in order to take advantage of ground-hugging radio propagation similar to commercial AM radio stations.

Distance between the Relay Nodes were approximately 150–200 miles, determined by the ground wave transmission range. During initial operations, the Relay Nodes would receive and relay brief test messages every 20 minutes. The system had built-in redundancy, using packet switching techniques for reconstruction of connectivity if system damage occurred.

=== Problems ===
Early in its lifetime, electrical interference problems caused by GWEN system operation began to surface. Since the stations were using LF, the chosen frequency was within 1 kHz of the operating frequency of nearby electrical carrier current systems. With GWEN handling constant voice, teletype and other data traffic, it caused interference to the power companies' diagnostic two kilohertz side carrier tone. When the side carrier tone disappeared due to interference from GWEN, the power grid would interpret that as a system fault.

== Site layout ==
The overall area of a GWEN Relay Node was approximately 11 acres (4.5 ha), approximately 700 feet (210 m) × 700 feet. It was surrounded on the perimeter by locked, 8-foot-high (2.4 m) chain-link fences topped with barbed wire. Typical site features included:

- A main Longwave transmitting tower (generally between 290 and 299 feet (88 and 91 m) tall)
- A radial network of underground wires forming a large ground plane to serve as a reflecting surface for radio waves
- Three electronic equipment shelters; two located near the perimeter of the site, and one at the base of the tower containing an antenna-tuning unit (ATU)
- UHF and LF receive antennas mounted on either a 10 ft. mast, 30 ft. light pole, or 60–150 ft. tower.
- A diesel backup generator, with a two-chambered fuel tank having a capacity of 1,020 US gallons (3,900 L)

The main GWEN antenna operated intermittently in the LF band at 150 to 175 kilohertz (kHz) (below the bottom of the AM broadcast band at 530 kHz). The peak broadcasting power was from 2,000 to 3,000 watts. The UHF antenna operated at 20 watts, between 225 and 400 megahertz (MHz).

== GWEN site locations ==
A 1998 U.S. Department of Transportation environmental impact survey that proposed repurposing a number of existing GWEN sites for use by the Nationwide Differential Global Positioning System listed the locations of 29 GWEN sites:

- Appleton, Washington
- Austin, Nevada
- Bakersfield, California
- Billings, Montana
- Bobo, Mississippi
- Clark, South Dakota
- Edinburg, North Dakota
- Fenner, California
- Flagstaff, Arizona
- Gettysburg, Pennsylvania
- Goodland, Kansas
- Grady, Alabama
- Great Falls, Montana
- Hackleburg, Alabama
- Hagerstown, Maryland
- Hawk Run, Pennsylvania
- Kirtland AFB, New Mexico
- Klamath Falls, Oregon
- Macon, Georgia
- Medford, Wisconsin
- Medora, North Dakota
- Onondaga, Michigan
- Penobscot, Maine
- Pueblo, Colorado
- Ronan, Montana
- Savannah Beach, Georgia
- Spokane, Washington
- Summerfield, Texas
- Whitney, Nebraska

== Termination ==
Some of the initial towers had prompted groups of citizens in Massachusetts, Oregon, Pennsylvania, and California to organize to fight construction of GWEN towers in their areas. The groups believed that the presence of a GWEN node would increase the community's "strategic worth" in the eyes of the Soviet Union and thus invite attack. Responding to these groups, the Air Force repeatedly downplayed the importance of the towers, stating they were not worth that kind of attention by the Soviet Union.

Amid controversy and world geopolitical changes, GWEN's value diminished greatly in the post-Cold War environment, in addition to its existence being rendered moot by the sustained effectiveness of predecessor and follow-on systems (Survivable Low Frequency Communication System and Minimum Essential Emergency Communication Network respectively). As early as 1990, legislative measures were enacted to terminate the program.

In 1994, new construction of GWEN towers were banned after a defense appropriations bill eliminated any funding for the towers for one year. A few months later, the United States Air Force announced that they would terminate the construction contract to build the remaining 25 towers, except for the money used to dismantle the system.

== Gallery ==
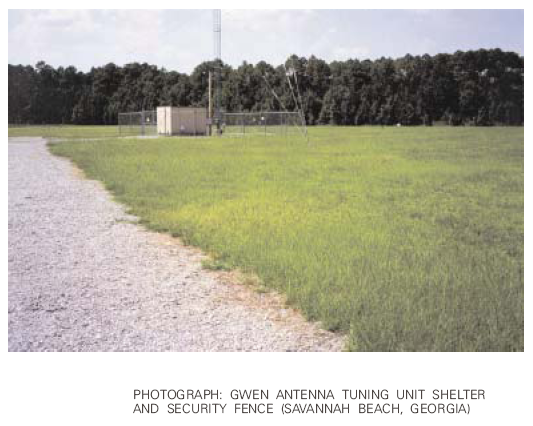
GWEN antenna shelter & security fence

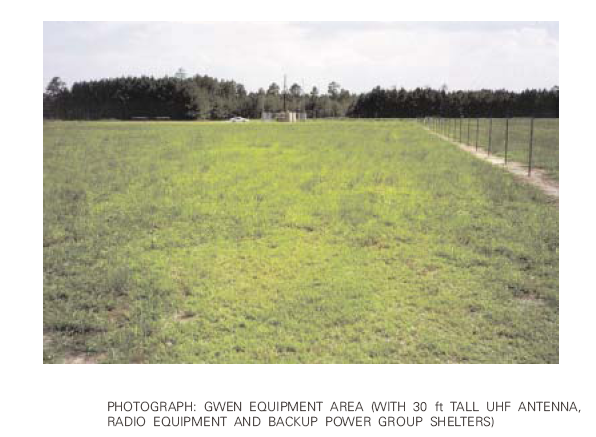
GWEN equipment area

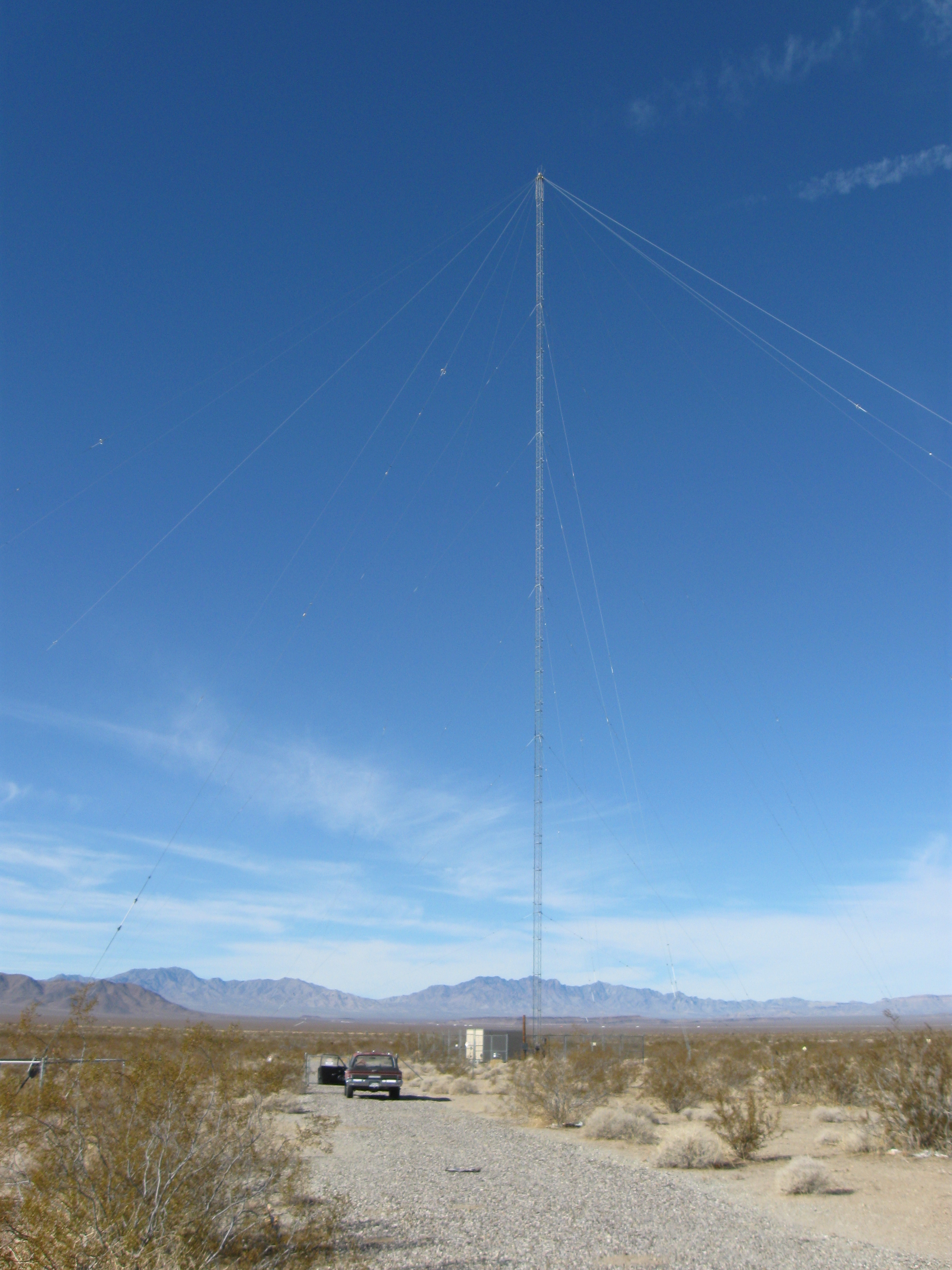
Former GWEN tower, Essex, California

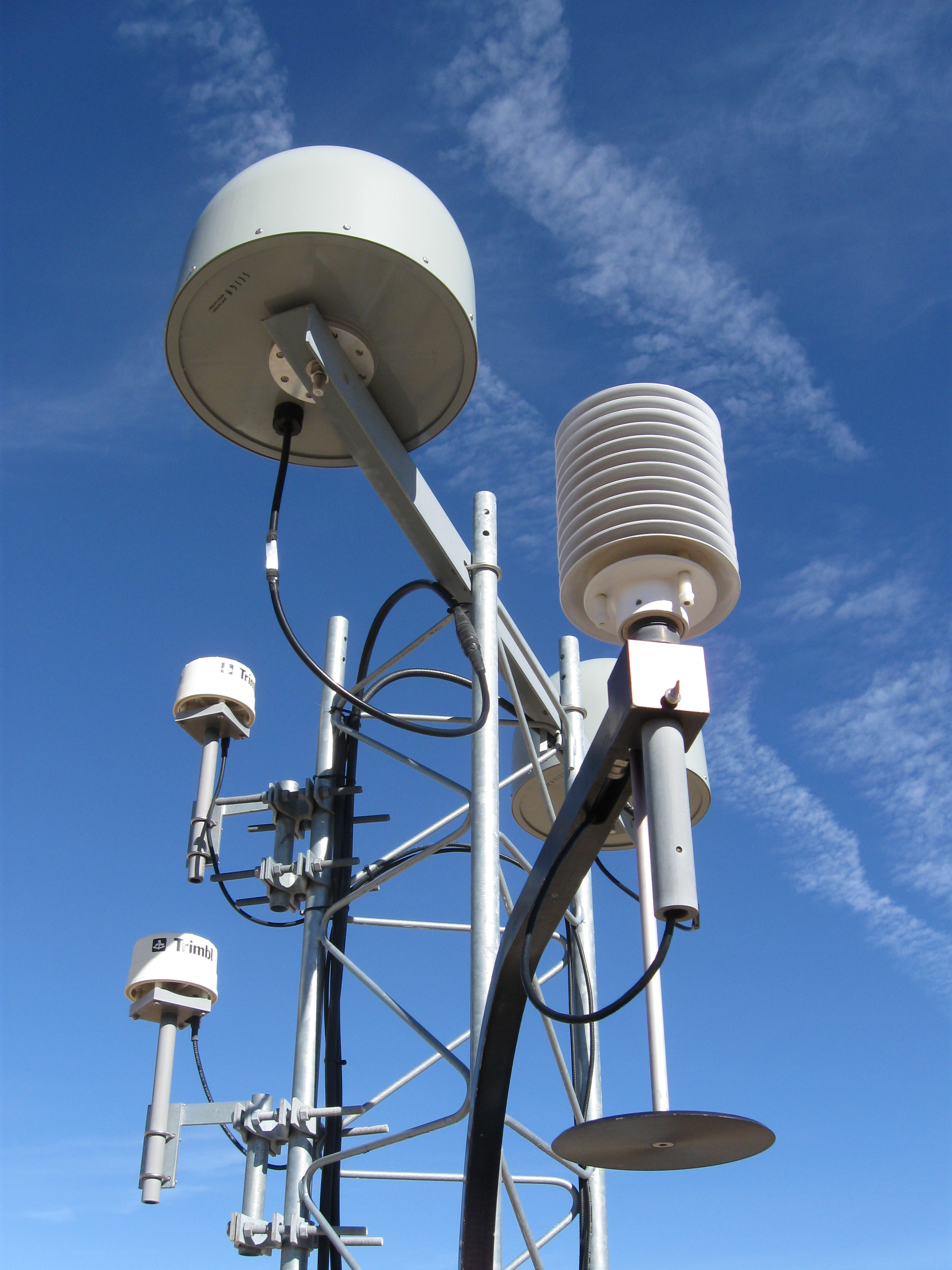
GPS gear added to former GWEN tower at Essex, California

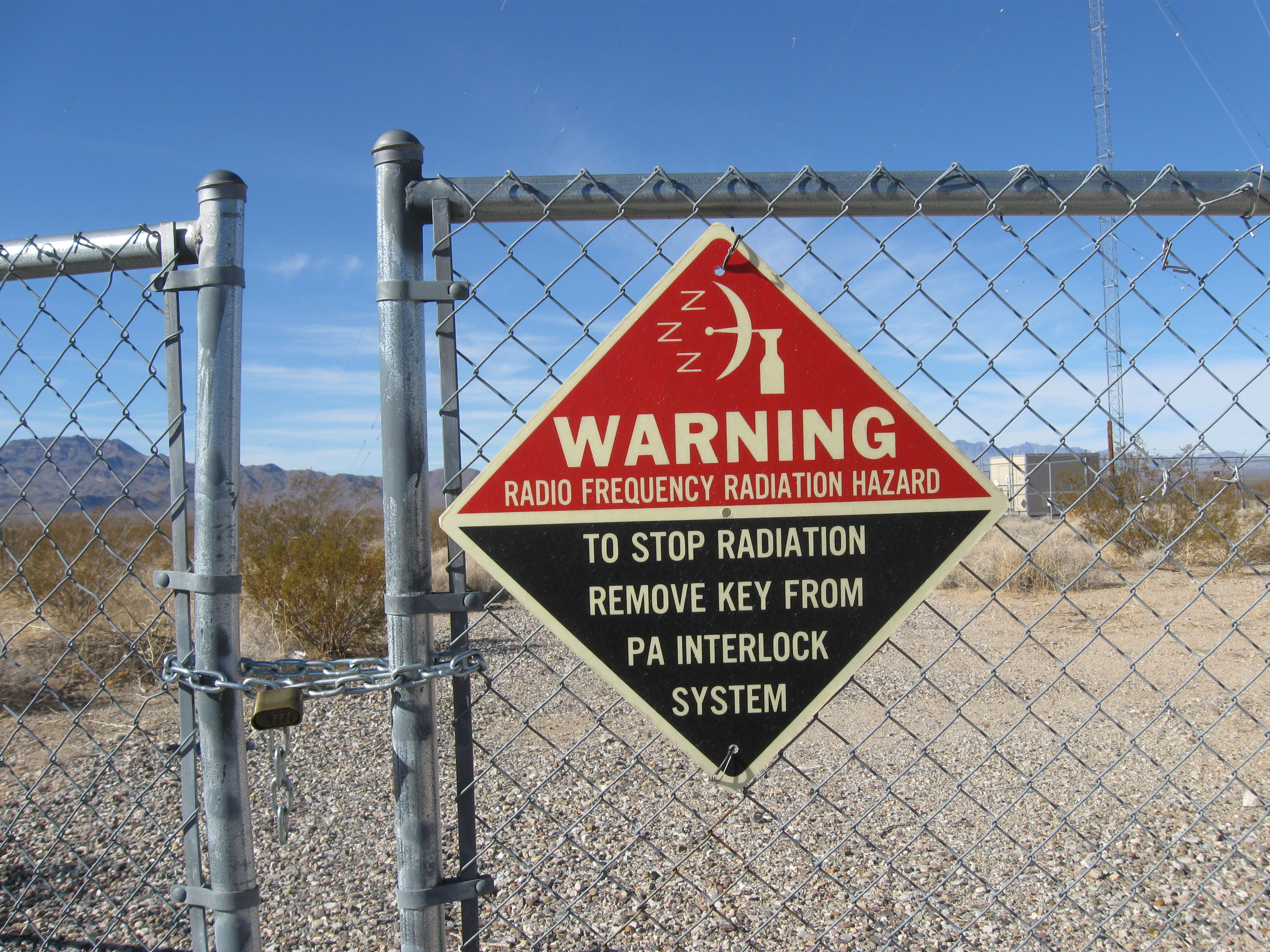
RF radiation warning sign on former GWEN site at Essex, California

== See also ==
- Command and Control (military)
- Differential Global Positioning System
- Post Attack Command and Control System (PACCS)
- Minimum Essential Emergency Communications Network (MEECN)
- Emergency Rocket Communications System (ERCS)
- Survivable Low Frequency Communications System (SLFCS)
- List of military electronics of the United States
