= Survivable Low Frequency Communications System =

U.S. radio-frequency command and control system

The AN/FRC-117 Survivable Low Frequency Communications System (SLFCS) was a communications system designed to be able to operate, albeit at low data transfer rates, during and after a nuclear attack. The system used both very low frequency (VLF), and low frequency (LF) radio bands.

== Mission ==
SLFCS was used for United States nuclear forces' command and control communications for Emergency Action Message dissemination and force direction. Single channel, receive only capability was provided at ICBM launch control centers. The single channel operated between 14 kHz and 60 kHz to receive commands from remotely located Combat Operations Center – Transmit/Receive (T/R) sites; this low frequency range is only slightly affected by nuclear blasts. For example, the Silver Creek site typically transmitted at 34.5 kHz. The transmitter could be tuned to any designated frequency in the above mentioned range. Receivers could receive down to 14.0 kHz.

SLFCS' primary advantage was that it would experience minimal radio signal degradation as a result of nuclear detonations. It would be an alternate means of communication during and after detonations, providing a survivable command and control communications network for the Strategic Air Command (SAC), the Joint Chiefs of Staff (JCS), and North American Aerospace Defense Command (NORAD). SLFCS would also relay signals from the Navy's LF/VLF systems.

== Locations ==
=== Transmitters ===
- Silver Creek, Nebraska (Detachment 1, 1st Aerospace Communications Group)
- Hawes Air Force Station, California (Detachment 2, 33rd Communications Squadron)
- PACCS aircraft
- NAOC (formerly known as NEACP)

=== GREEN PINE Stations ===
The GREEN PINE communication system took messages broadcast over SLFCS and 'upconverted' them to UHF messages for bombers headed north. There were a handful of GREEN PINE stations in the northern portions of Alaska and Canada.

=== Receive Only ===
- Altus AFB, Oklahoma
- Barksdale AFB, Louisiana (8th Air Force Command Post)
- Beale AFB, California (9 SRW Command Post)
- Blytheville AFB, Arkansas (97 BW Command Post) CLOSED
- Carswell AFB, Texas (7 BW Command Post) CLOSED
- Castle AFB, California (93 BW Command Post) CLOSED
- Davis-Monthan AFB, Arizona - 390th SMW (18 LCCs) CLOSED
- Dyess AFB, Texas (96 BW Command Post)
- Eielson AFB, Alaska (6 SW Command Post)
- Ellsworth AFB, South Dakota - 44th SMW (16 terminals - 15 LCCs and Wing Command Post) CLOSED
- Fairchild AFB, Washington
- F.E. Warren AFB, Wyoming - 90th Missile Wing, 20th Air Force (21 terminals- 20 LCCs, 1 at 20th AF Missile Operations Center)
- Grand Forks AFB, North Dakota - 321st SMW (16 terminals - 15 LCCs and Wing Command Post) CLOSED
- Griffiss AFB, New York CLOSED
- Grissom AFB, Indiana
- K.I. Sawyer AFB, Michigan CLOSED
- Little Rock AFB, Arkansas - 308th SMW (18 LCCs) CLOSED
- Loring AFB, Maine (42 BW Command Post) CLOSED
- Luke AFB, Arizona
- Rickenbacker AFB, Ohio
- Malmstrom AFB, Montana 341st SMW (20 terminals - 20 LCCs)
- Mather AFB, California CLOSED
- McConnell AFB, Kansas 22 BW (Command Post), 381st SMW (18 LCCs) CLOSED
- Minot AFB, North Dakota (5 BW/91 SMW 15 LCCs)
- Pease AFB, New Hampshire (509 BW Command Post) CLOSED
- Plattsburgh AFB, New York (380 BW Command Post) CLOSED
- Robins AFB, Georgia (19 BW Command Post)
- Seymour Johnson AFB, North Carolina (68 BW Command Post)
- Travis AFB, California
- Vandenberg AFB, California (1 STRAD Command Post)1 LCC O1A
- Whiteman AFB, Missouri - 351st SMW (16 terminals - 15 LCCs and Wing Command Post) CLOSED
- Wurtsmith AFB, Michigan CLOSED
- March AFB, California (15th AF COC)

== History ==
The first program (487L) took six years from the time of the initial requirement to full operation. The second part (616A), which was basically a modification of an already operational system, took 10 years.

=== Chronology ===
- 1961
  - 29 Sep – Headquarters USAF issues Specific Operating Requirement 193, for the Survivable Low Frequency Communications System; system is envisioned to link Alternate Joint Command Center with command centers of SAC, NORAD, SAC numbered air forces with LF radio networks; a total of 18 transmit/receive (T/R) sites and 375 LF-receive only (R/O) in all SAC launch facilities, mobile Minuteman trains, SAC air base control rooms, and SAC UHF positive control stations in the northern tier
- 1962
  - 12 Mar – Amendment to SOR 193 changes number of transmit T/R sites to 19 (three each at AJCC, SAC, NORAD, two each at 2d Air Force, 15th Air Force and 8th Air Force, one each at Larson AFB, Southern Alaska, Sondrestrom AB, and the United Kingdom; Full Operating Capability was extended from July 1964 to May 1965.
  - 27 Apr – A revised program directive delineated the network; T/R equipment would be installed at HQ SAC, the SAC numbered air force headquarters, and in the ABNCP, Alternate Joint Command Center (AJCC) and NORAD command center. 14 Green Pine stations, missile launch control centers, all SAC bomber wing command posts would have R/O terminals, as would the NORAD regional control centers. Initial Operating Capability (IOC) was placed at 1 Oct 1966.
- 1968
  - 29 Jul 1968 – Silver Creek site accepted by SAC
  - 19 Aug 1968 – Silver Creek site turned on for continuous operation
  - 5 Sep 1968 – Silver Creek begins operational testing
- 1971
  - 16 Jun – SLFCS IOC obtained by SAC units
- 1974
  - 26 Jul – HQ USAF approves Program 616A (Improved SLFCS); system would improve SLFCS by providing anti-jam protection, improved modems, increased range and make it compatible with the Navy LF/VLF system
- 1978
  - SAC conducts Initial Operational Test and Evaluation (IOT&E) at Ellsworth AFB, South Dakota for Program 616A; test is successful
- 1986
  - 30 Sep – deactivation of Hawes Radio Relay Site, Hinkley, California
  - 20 Oct – destruction of Hawes Radio Relay Site by the Army Corps of Engineers
- 1996
  - Rapid Execution and Combat Targeting (REACT) upgrade to Minuteman launch control centers complete; advances allow SLFCS messages to be handled automatically by Higher Authority Communications/Rapid Message Processing Element (HAC/RMPE)
- 2005
  - 11 Nov – last Minuteman Launch Control Center receives Minimum Essential Emergency Communications Network (MEECN) upgrade, rendering SLFCS obsolete.
- 2010 MMP – Minuteman Minimum Essential Emergency Communications Network Program now in the upgrade portion. Work In Progress. Advanced EHF will be available once upgrade is complete.

== Photo gallery ==
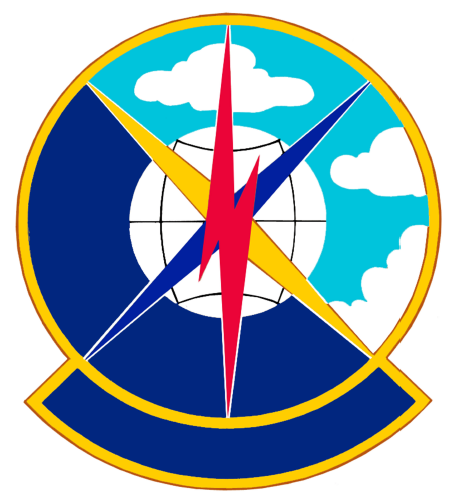
33d Comm Squadron, Hawes AFS, California

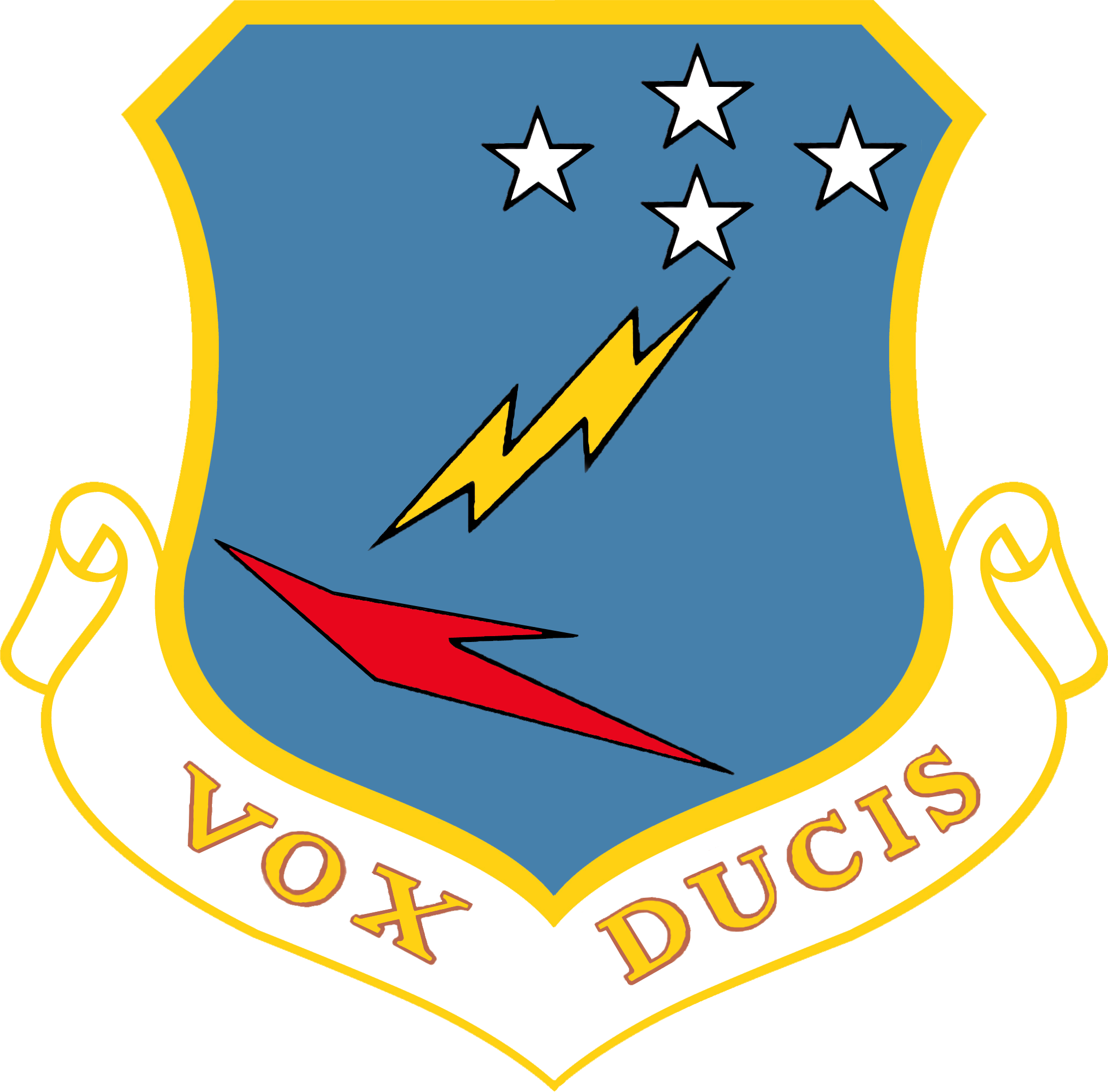
1st Aerospace Comm Group, Offutt AFB, Nebraska

== See also ==
- Post Attack Command and Control System (PACCS)
- Ground Wave Emergency Network (GWEN)
- Minimum Essential Emergency Communications Network (MEECN)
- Emergency Rocket Communications System (ERCS)
- Hawes Radio Tower – Location of the West Coast SLFCS transmitter until the mid-1980s at Hawes field
- Silver Creek Communications Annex – Location of the East Coast SLFCS transmitter until the mid-1990s
