= Airborne Launch Control System =

US Strategic Command platform

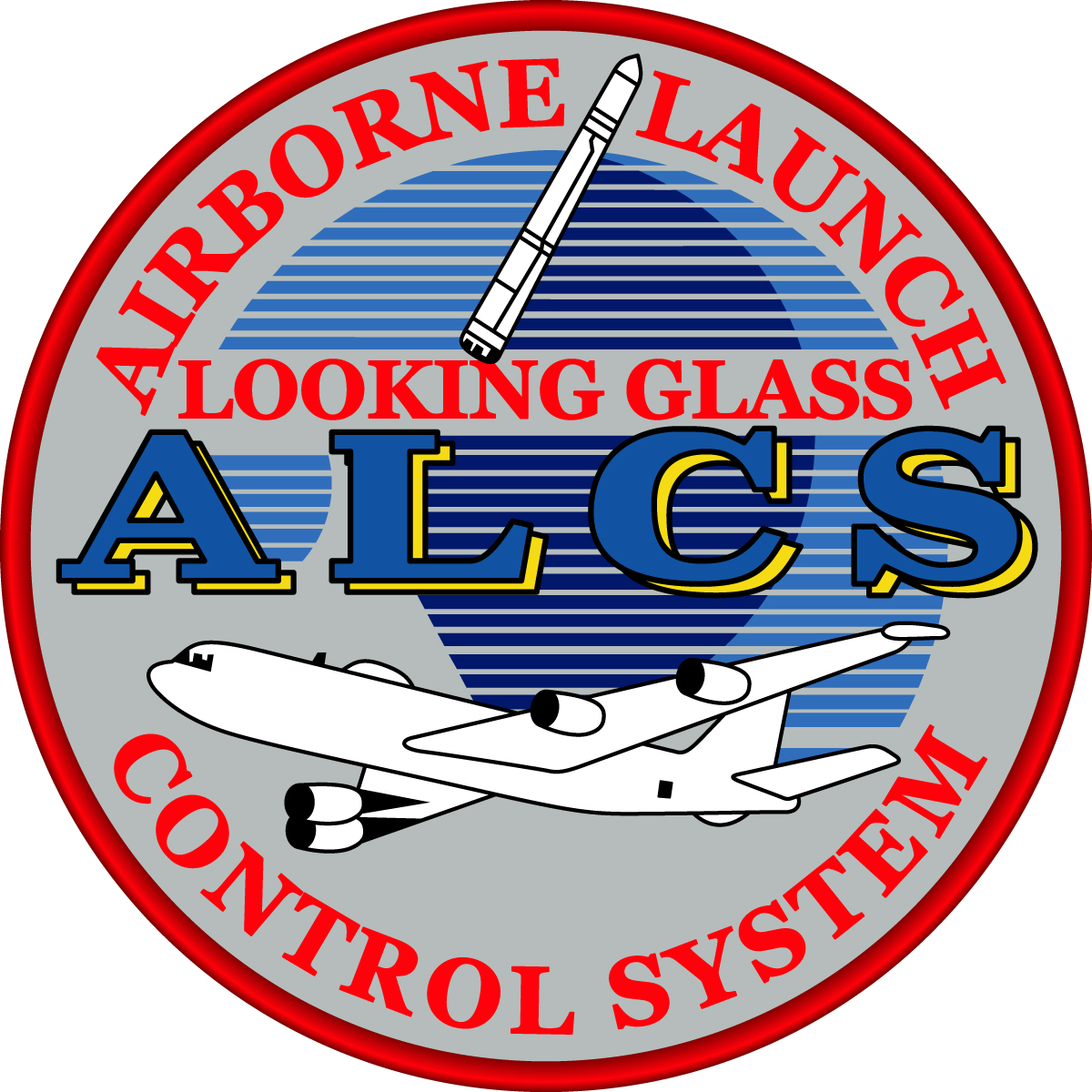

General information
- Type: Survivable LGM-30G ICBM Command & Control
- Manufacturer: Northrop Grumman
- Status: In service
- Primary user: Air Force Global Strike Command; United States Strategic Command; 625th Strategic Operations Squadron

History
- Introduction date: May 31, 1967

The Airborne Launch Control System (ALCS) provides a survivable launch capability for the United States Air Force's LGM-30G Minuteman III intercontinental ballistic missile (ICBM) force. The ALCS is operated by airborne missileers from Air Force Global Strike Command's (AFGSC) 625th Strategic Operations Squadron (STOS) and United States Strategic Command (USSTRATCOM). The system is located on board the United States Navy's E-6B Mercury, which serves as USSTRATCOM's "Looking Glass" Airborne Command Post (ABNCP). The ALCS crew is integrated into the ABNCP battle staff and is on alert around the clock.

== Overview ==
In the mid-1960s, United States civilian and military leadership became concerned about the possibility of a decapitating attack from the Soviets, destroying any land-based communication links to the nuclear forces of the Strategic Air Command. One solution to the communication problem was placing radio equipment on board an aircraft, and allow it to fly over the United States and use radio broadcasts to pass along information. This concept would allow communication to missile launch crews to pass along Emergency Action Messages (EAMs), but would not duplicate the missile combat crew's function of actually launching the missiles. The key characteristic added to ALCS (versus other communication methods such as ERCS) was giving the airborne crews the same degree of access to the launch facilities as the underground missile crews.

Minuteman launch facilities contained an ultra high frequency (UHF) receiver that would pick up commands from the ALCS; the destruction of the launch control center or the hardened intersite cable system would not prevent retaliation.

== History ==
ALCS' first generation equipment was declared operational on 31 May 1967.

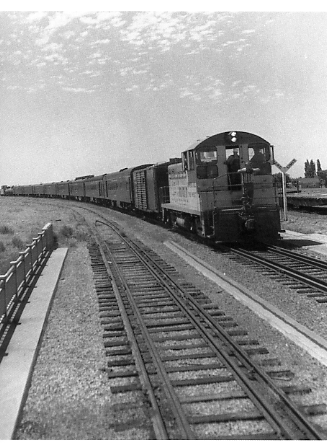
Train-mobile Minuteman ICBM testing underway

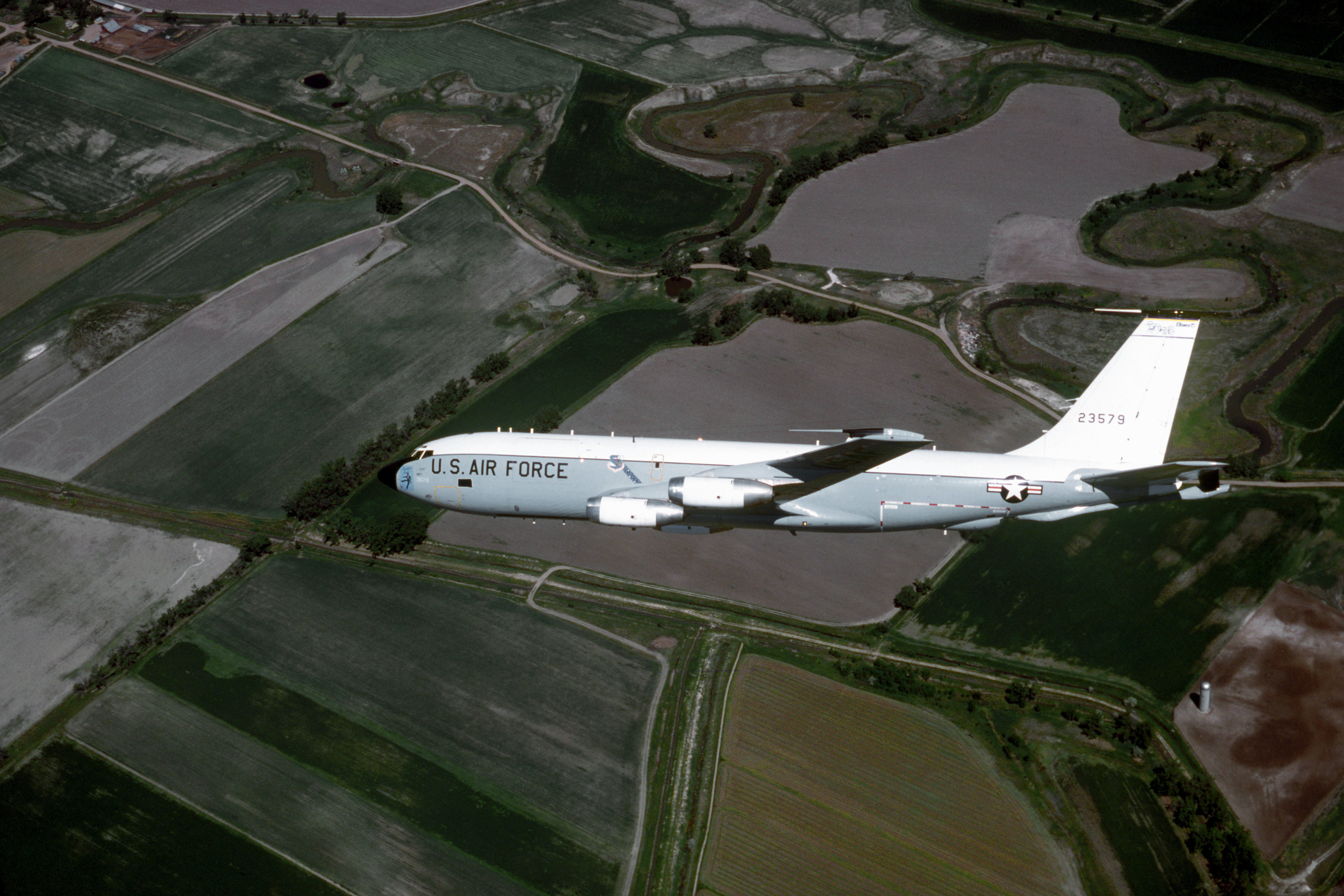
EC-135A ALCC

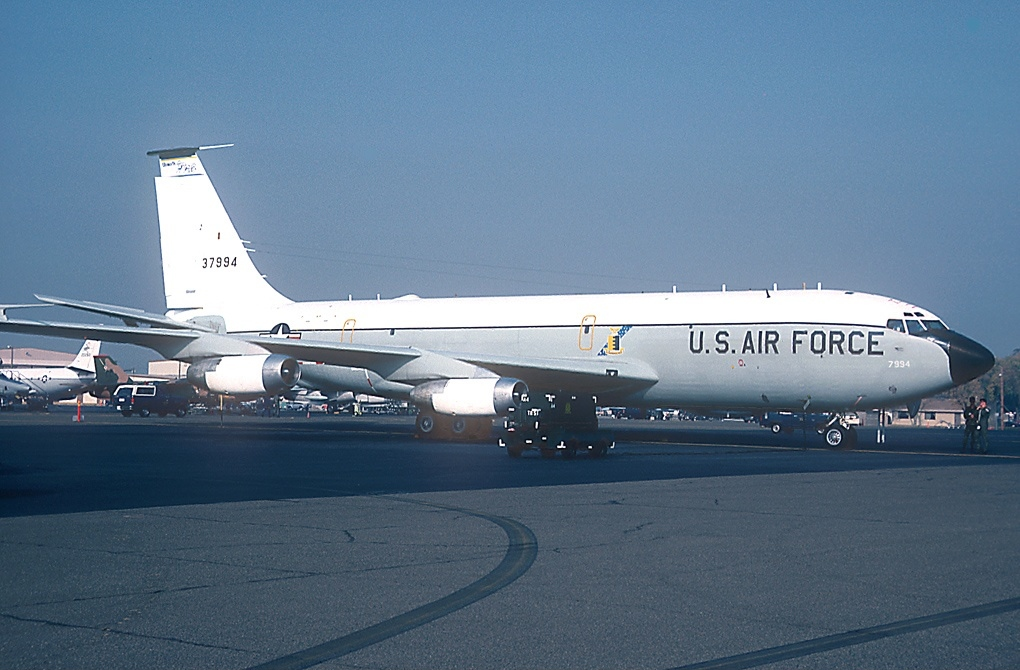
EC-135G at Ellsworth AFB, South Dakota

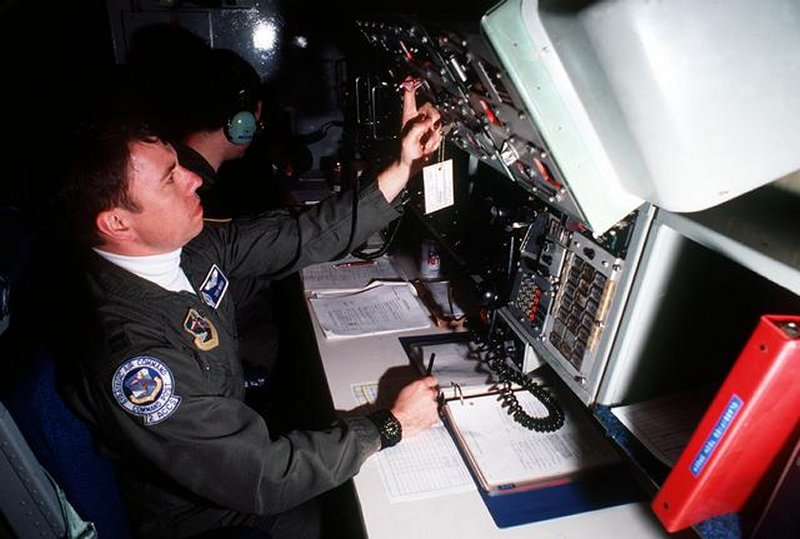
ALCS Crewmember from 2 ACCS

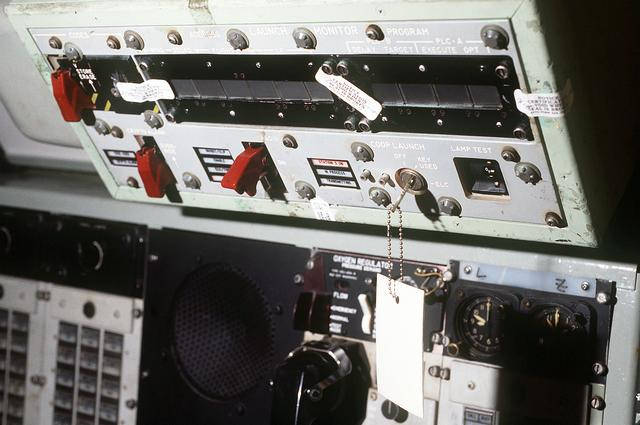
Legacy ALCS equipment

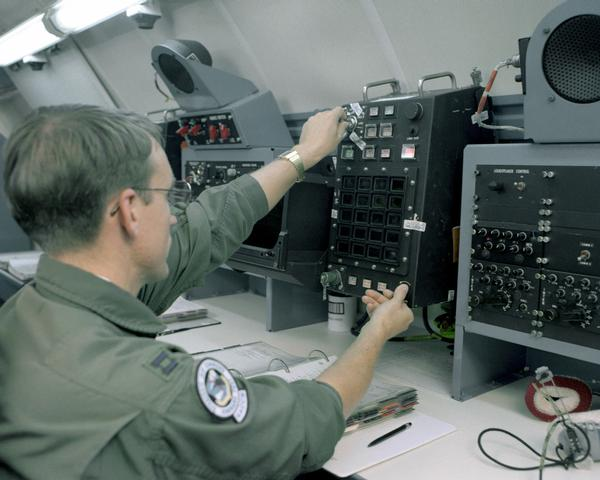
Common ALCS equipment came online in 1987 so that the ALCS could be compatible with the new Peacekeeper ICBM. The Common ALCS equipment is still in use today.

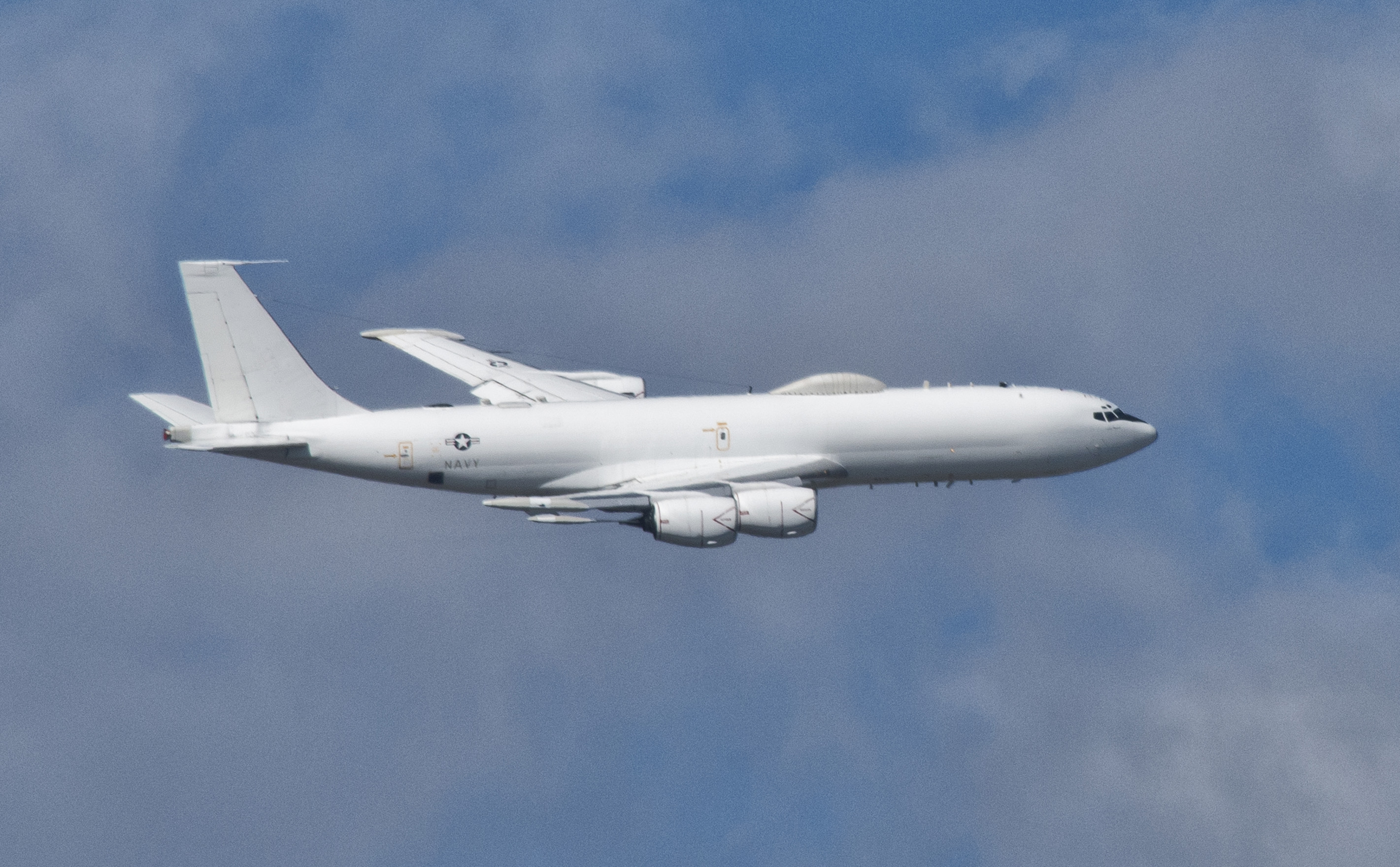
E-6B Mercury—current ALCS equipped aircraft

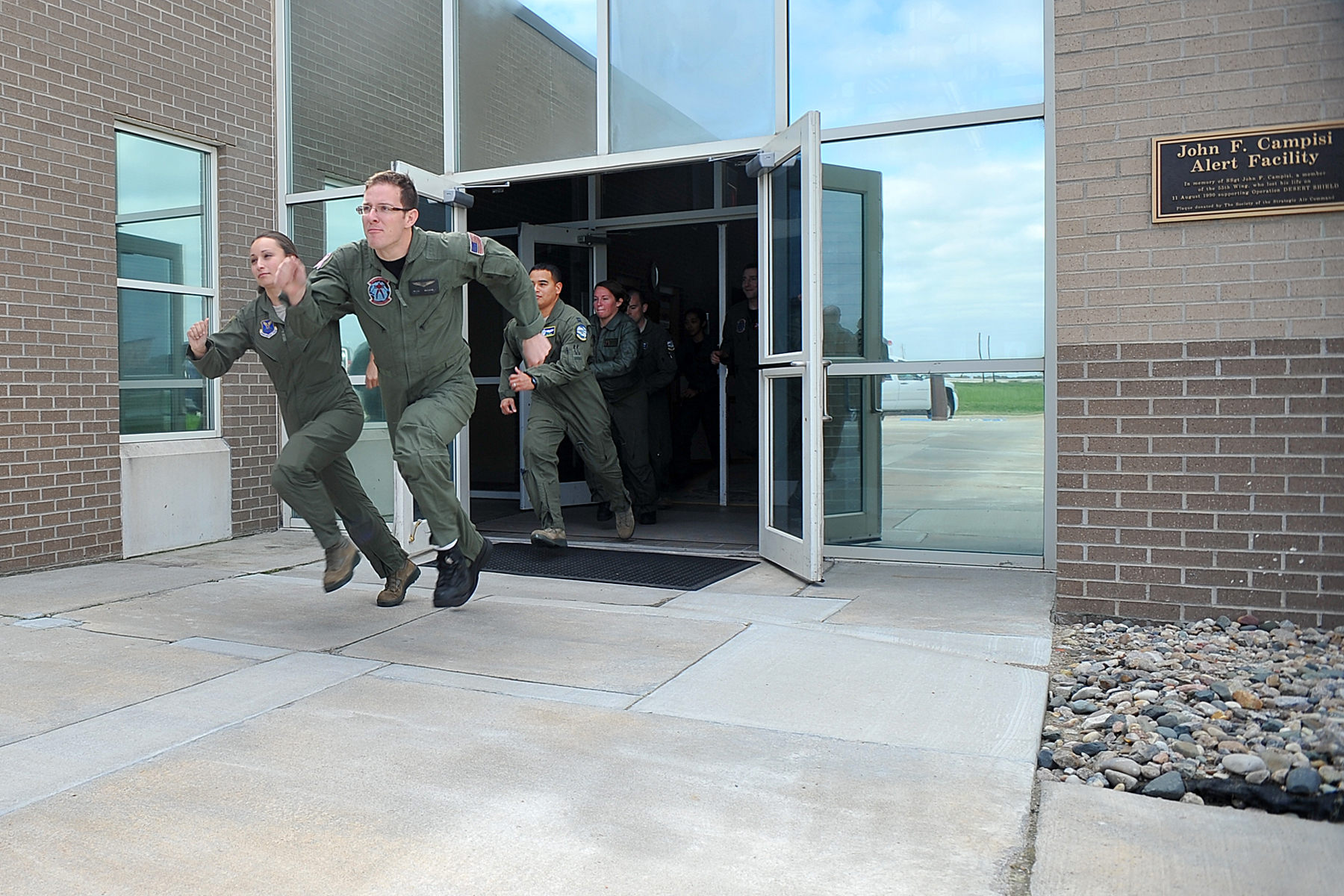
USSTRATCOM Airborne Command Post crew members responding to their aircraft during an alert response exercise

== Operational information ==
=== ALCS-configured aircraft ===
The ALCS mission has been held by multiple aircraft during the last 50 years:

- EC-135 – performed Looking Glass and ALCC mission for the Strategic Air Command (1967–1998)
  - EC-135A (ALCC)
  - EC-135C (ABNCP and ALCC)
  - EC-135G (ALCC and ABNCP)
  - EC-135L PACCS Radio Relay
- E-4B Advanced Airborne Command Post – Aircraft tail number 75-0125 performed Looking Glass on a trial basis from 1980 to 1981 to assess possibility of replacing EC-135 fleet. Deemed too expensive and ALCS was subsequently removed from the E-4B.
- E-6B Mercury – performs Looking Glass, ALCC, and TACAMO mission for United States Strategic Command (1998–Present)
  - E-6B

=== ICBMs remotely controlled ===
- LGM-30A/B Minuteman I (1967–1975)
- LGM-30F Minuteman II (1967–1992)
- LGM-30G Minuteman III (1971–present)
- LGM-118A Peacekeeper (1987–2005)

=== Units ===
==== Units with ALCS crewmembers assigned ====
- 68th Strategic Missile Squadron (Ellsworth AFB, SD: 1967-1970)
- 91st Strategic Missile Wing (Minot AFB, ND: 1967-1969)
- 4th Airborne Command and Control Squadron (Ellsworth AFB, SD: 1970-1992)
- 2nd Airborne Command and Control Squadron (Offutt AFB, NE: 1970-1994)
- 7th Airborne Command and Control Squadron (Offutt AFB, NE: 1994-1998)
- 625th Missile Operations Flight/USSTRATCOM (Offutt AFB, NE: 1998-2007)
- 625th Strategic Operations Squadron/USSTRATCOM (Offutt AFB, NE: 2007–Present)

==== Units with ALCS-equipped aircraft ====
- 28th Air Refueling Squadron (Ellsworth AFB, SD: 1967-1970)
  - EC-135A, EC-135G
- 906th Air Refueling Squadron (Minot AFB, ND: 1967-1969
  - EC-135A, EC-135L
- 38th Strategic Reconnaissance Squadron (Offutt AFB, NE: 1967-1970)
  - EC-135C
- 4th Airborne Command and Control Squadron (Ellsworth AFB, SD: 1970-1992)
  - EC-135A, EC-135C, EC-135G, EC-135L
- 2nd Airborne Command and Control Squadron (Offutt AFB, NE: 1970-1994)
  - EC-135C
- 7th Airborne Command and Control Squadron (Offutt AFB, NE: 1994-1998)
  - EC-135C
- STRATCOMWING ONE (Tinker AFB, OK: 1998–Present)
  - Fleet Air Reconnaissance Squadron 3 (VQ-3)
    - E-6B Mercury
  - Fleet Air Reconnaissance Squadron 4 (VQ-4)
    - E-6B Mercury

==== ALCS personnel ====
The Airborne Launch Control System Flight of the 625th Strategic Operations Squadron provides training and crewmembers for two ALCS positions on board the E-6B Mercury.

== ALCS-assisted launches ==
A test of the ALCS, both ground and air components, is called a GIANT BALL.

This list does not contain any launches after the initial Test and Evaluation phase of the system.

ALCS-assisted ICBM Launches
Date	Designation	System	Location	Note
3 Mar 1967	BUSY LOBBY	Minuteman	Vandenberg AFB, LF 5	First ALCS-assisted launch (not in Launch History records)
17 Apr 1967	BUSY MISSILE	Minuteman	Vandenberg AFB, LF 08	
28 Apr 1967	BUSY MUMMY	Minuteman	Vandenberg AFB, LF 02	
11 May 1967	BUSY FELLOW	Minuteman	Vandenberg AFB, LF 21	
25 Jan 1968	OLY TRIALS 7	Minuteman II	Vandenberg AFB, LF 22	
12 Mar 1969	GIANT FIST 3	Minuteman II	Vandenberg AFB, LF 04	
18 Apr 1969	SST M-3	Minuteman II	Vandenberg AFB, LF 25	
18 Jun 1969	GLORY TRIP 37B	Minuteman II	Vandenberg AFB, LF 07	
23 Jul 1969	GLORY TRIP 41B	Minuteman II	Vandenberg AFB, LF 07	
26 Aug 1969	GLORY TRIP 15F	Minuteman II	Vandenberg AFB, LF 22	
13 Oct 1969	GLORY TRIP 22F	Minuteman	Vandenberg AFB, LF 24	
21 Oct 1969	GLORY TRIP 45B	Minuteman	Vandenberg AFB, LF 07	
5 Dec 1969	GLORY TRIP 50B	Minuteman	Vandenberg AFB, LF 07	
23 Mar 1970	GLORY TRIP 63B	Minuteman	Vandenberg AFB, LF 07	
21 May 1970	GLORY TRIP 55F	Minuteman	Vandenberg AFB, LF 25	
8 Jun 1970	GLORY TRIP 72B	Minuteman	Vandenberg AFB, LF 07	
9 Jul 1970	GLORY TRIP 66F	Minuteman	Vandenberg AFB, LF 24	
3 Aug 1970	GLORY TRIP 61F	Minuteman	Vandenberg AFB, LF 25	
4 Aug 1970	GLORY TRIP 16L	Minuteman	Vandenberg AFB, LF 05	
26 Aug 1970	GLORY TRIP 43M	Minuteman	Vandenberg AFB, LF 05	

== See also ==
- Post-Attack Command and Control System – Former US nuclear communications network
- Airborne Launch Control Center – US Strategic force
- Operation Looking Glass – American command and control center
- EC-135 – Command and control aircraft by Boeing
- Boeing E-6 Mercury – Airborne command post aircraft by Boeing based on 707 airframe
- Emergency Rocket Communications System – US Strategic Forces communications system for ballistic missiles (1963–1991)
- 625th Strategic Operations Squadron – US Air Force unit
- TACAMO – US strategic communications system
