= LGM-30 Minuteman chronology =

Intercontinental ballistic missile

This is a chronology of the LGM-30 Minuteman intercontinental ballistic missile (ICBM), acquisition and operational.

First research activity that lead to the U.S. development of intercontinental ballistic missiles began in 1956. Specific research and development (R&D) on the Minuteman missile began in 1958. The system was fully operational in at least three United States Air Force (USAF) wings by 1965. By this time the Minuteman II had already reached the flight test stage.

== Program chronology ==
- 1956
  - Von Neumann Committee approved Ballistic Missile feasibility program
  - Research and development (R&D) programs and contracts authorized
- 1957
  - Intercontinental ballistic missile (ICBM) improvements studies started
  - Minuteman configuration studies started
- 1958
  - Minuteman R&D program authorized
- 1959
  - First R&D firing from silo - inert second and third stage
- 1960
  - First contract for operational wing facilities at Wing I (the 341st Strategic Missile Wing)
  - Missile production
- 1961
  - First all-up missile launch from pad at Eastern Test Range
  - First missile launch from silo at Eastern Test Range
- 1962
  - First missile launch from Western Test Range
  - Minuteman I operational flight turnover at 341st Strategic Missile Wing (Wing I)
- 1963
  - First wing turnover at Wing I, Wing II turnover
  - Force Mod program approved
  - First motor static test firing to verify reliability
- 1964
  - Wing III and Wing IV turnover
  - New features approved
  - Minuteman II flight test
  - GIANT BOOST
- 1965
  - Wing V turnover
  - Vulnerability improvements
  - Minuteman fully operational at Wing II, Wing III
- 1966
  - Wing IV turnover
  - Minuteman III approval
  - Aging surveillance program initiated
  - Minuteman II operational at Wing VI
  - AN/DRC-8 Emergency Rocket Communications System (ERCS) deployed
- 1967
  - Squadron 20 turnover
  - Force Mod at Wing IV
  - Airborne Launch Control System goes on alert
- 1968
  - Hard rock silo program started
  - First Minuteman III R&D flight
- 1969
  - Force Mod rate decrease
  - Force Mod at Wing I complete
  - Service Star testing began for RSs
- 1970
  Minuteman III on display at Air Force Museum
  - First Minuteman III at Wing III (Hotel Flight/H-02)
  - Upgrade silo and CDB programs started
  - First MOM test at Wing VI
- 1971
  - Minuteman III dust program started
  - Force Mod at Wing III completed
- 1972
  - Minuteman III deployed at Wing VI
  - First dust-hardened Minuteman III deployed at Wing VI
  - Minuteman ordnance service life analysis program developed
  - Responsibility for service life testing transferred to Ogden Air Logistics Center (OO-ALC), Hill Air Force Base, Utah
- 1973
  - Upgrade silo and CDB IOC at Wing V
  - Force Mod and upgrade silo completed at Wing II
  - Last MOM at Wing III
- 1974
  - Full Force upgrade silo approved
  - MK12A and Pave Pepper programs started
  - SSAS was deployed for Minuteman II
- 1975
  - Upgrade silo and CDB completed at Wing V
  - Upgrade silo and CDB start at Wing III
  - Simulated Electronic Launch Minuteman (SELM) program started
  - Minuteman bench test program concept developed by OO-ALC
  - Minuteman III fully deployed
  - Minuteman program management responsibility transfer (PMRT)
- 1976
  - Upgrade silo and CDB completed at Wing III
  - Upgrade silo and CDB completed at Wing VI
  - Long range service life analysis performed for propulsion system
  - Hybrid explicit implemented for Minuteman III
  - Minuteman II MGS vibration test program initiated
  - New calibration schedule implemented to correct MGS startup transients
  - Minuteman II Stage 3 lot 16 motor igniters replaced
- 1977
  - Minuteman III missile production terminated
  - Inertial performance data began to be collected for guidance system fault isolation
  - Began implementation of ILCS at Minuteman II wings
- 1978
  - GIP implemented at Minuteman III
  - Thrust termination port investigation began
- 1979
  - Minuteman II stage 2 motor remanufacturing program began to correct degraded liner/Minuteman III stage 3 degraded liner investigation initiated
  - USAF advisory board recommended that carbon-carbon nose tips be developed for MK12 RVs
- 1980
  - Upgrade silo and CDB completed at Wing VI
  - Minuteman II accuracy/reliability investigation conducted
  - VRSA replacement design started
  - Diagnostic data package hardware delivered to provide re-entry/separation data for Minuteman II flights
- 1981
  - MGS electronics investigation completed
  - Accuracy, Reliability, Supportability Improvement Program (ARSIP) program began
- 1982
  - Minuteman III guidance upgrade program implemented
  - MK12A re-entry vehicle FOC
  - Special operational test program began - Minuteman II
  - Hardness critical items identified and procured
- 1983
  - Minuteman III MGS vibration test program initiated
  - Special operational test program complete - accuracy improvements verified
- 1984
  - Minuteman Extended Survivable Power IOC
  - GUP implemented for Minuteman III
- 1985
  - Rivet MILE (Minuteman Integrated Life Extension) program began
- 1986
  - LGM-118A Peacekeeper deployment initiated
- 1987
  - Integrated Nuclear Effects Assessment (INEA)
  - ARSIP implemented for Minuteman II
  - Piece-parts manufacturing for diminished manufacturing sources
  - Rivet MILE began Improved Minuteman Physical Security System (IMPSS) installation
- 1988
  - Minuteman III Stage 2 washout/Stage 3 replacement
  - Comprehensive reliability investigations conducted
  - Peacekeeper fully operational at Wing V
- 1989
  - Rapid Execution and Combat Targeting (REACT) program initiated
  - Rocket Motor Transporter replacement
  - Code Change Verifier replacement
  - Transporter-Erector replacement
- 1990
- 1991
  - Minuteman II removed from SIOP
- 1992
  - Minuteman II deactivation initiated
  - MESP discontinued
  - Rivet MILE completes IMPSS installation
  - SRV Program initiated
  - Rivet ADD initiated
  - Missile Transporter replacement
  - Missile Transporter (PT III) replacement
- 1993
  - GRP contract awarded
- 1994
  - PRP initial contracts awarded
- 1995
  - REACT consoles begin deployment
  - Minuteman II deactivation complete
  - BRAC decision to close Wing VI by 1998
- 1996
  - REACT deployment complete
- 1998
  - Wing VI deactivation complete
  - Wing VI Minuteman IIIs moved to Wing I
  - AF awards ICBM Prime contract to TRW team for ICBM engineering
- 1999
  - First NS-50 MGS deployed
  - Congress establishes the Minuteman Missile National Historic Site
- 2000
- 2001
  - PRP deployment initiated
- 2005
  - Peacekeeper deactivation complete
- 2007-08
  - Deactivation and removal of 50 Minuteman III's at Malmstrom AFB, MT.

== Test launches ==
Minuteman IA/B
Date	System	Location	Nickname	Note
1 Feb 1961	Minuteman I	Cape Canaveral AFS, LF-31A		Serial 401
19 May 1961	Minuteman I	Cape Canaveral AFS, LF-31A		
27 Jul 1961	Minuteman I	Cape Canaveral AFS, LF-31A		
30 Aug 1961	Minuteman I	Cape Canaveral AFS, LF-32B		
17 Nov 1961	Minuteman I	Cape Canaveral AFS, LF-32B		
18 Dec 1961	Minuteman I	Cape Canaveral AFS		
5 Jan 1962	Minuteman I	Cape Canaveral AFS		
25 Jan 1962	Minuteman I	Cape Canaveral AFS		
15 Feb 1962	Minuteman I	Cape Canaveral AFS		
8 Mar 1962	Minuteman I	Cape Canaveral AFS		
22 Mar 1962	Minuteman I	Cape Canaveral AFS		
24 Apr 1962	Minuteman I	Cape Canaveral AFS		
11 May 1962	Minuteman I	Cape Canaveral AFS		
18 May 1962	Minuteman I	Cape Canaveral AFS		
8 Jun 1962	Minuteman I	Cape Canaveral AFS		
29 Jun 1962	Minuteman I	Cape Canaveral AFS		
12 Jul 1962	Minuteman I	Cape Canaveral AFS		
9 Aug 1962	Minuteman I	Cape Canaveral AFS		
18 Sep 1962	Minuteman I	Cape Canaveral AFS		
19 Sep 1962	Minuteman I	Cape Canaveral AFS		
17 Oct 1962	Minuteman I	Cape Canaveral AFS		
19 Nov 1962	Minuteman I	Cape Canaveral AFS		
7 Dec 1962	Minuteman I	Cape Canaveral AFS		
14 Dec 1962	Minuteman I	Cape Canaveral AFS		
20 Dec 1962	Minuteman I	Cape Canaveral AFS		
7 Jan 1963	Minuteman I	Cape Canaveral AFS		
23 Jan 1963	Minuteman I	Cape Canaveral AFS		
20 Feb 1963	Minuteman I	Cape Canaveral AFS		
18 Mar 1963	Minuteman I	Cape Canaveral AFS		
27 Mar 1963	Minuteman I	Cape Canaveral AFS		
10 Apr 1963	Minuteman I	Cape Canaveral AFS		
18 May 1963	Minuteman I	Cape Canaveral AFS		
28 May 1963	Minuteman I	Cape Canaveral AFS		
5 Jun 1963	Minuteman I	Cape Canaveral AFS		
27 Jun 1963	Minuteman I	Cape Canaveral AFS		
1 Jul 1963	Minuteman I	Cape Canaveral AFS		
17 Jul 1963	Minuteman I	Cape Canaveral AFS		
25 Jul 1963	Minuteman I	Cape Canaveral AFS		
5 Aug 1963	Minuteman I	Cape Canaveral AFS		
27 Aug 1963	Minuteman I	Cape Canaveral AFS		
7 Nov 1963	Minuteman I	Cape Canaveral AFS		
13 Nov 1963	Minuteman I	Cape Canaveral AFS		
18 Dec 1963	Minuteman I	Cape Canaveral AFS		
16 Jan 1964	Minuteman I	Cape Canaveral AFS		
28 Jan 1964	Minuteman I	Cape Canaveral AFS		
12 Feb 1964	Minuteman I	Cape Canaveral AFS		
25 Feb 1964	Minuteman I	Cape Canaveral AFS		
27 Feb 1964	Minuteman I	Cape Canaveral AFS		
13 Mar 1964	Minuteman I	Cape Canaveral AFS		
20 Mar 1964	Minuteman I	Cape Canaveral AFS		
30 Mar 1964	Minuteman I	Cape Canaveral AFS		
7 Apr 1964	Minuteman I	Cape Canaveral AFS		
24 Apr 1964	Minuteman I	Cape Canaveral AFS		
29 Sep 1964	Minuteman I	Cape Canaveral AFS		
Minuteman II
Date	System	Location	Nickname	Note
24 Sep 1964	Minuteman II	Cape Canaveral AFS		
29 Sep 1964	Minuteman II	Cape Canaveral AFS		
29 Oct 1964	Minuteman II	Cape Canaveral AFS		
15 Dec 1964	Minuteman II	Cape Canaveral AFS		
18 Dec 1964	Minuteman II	Cape Canaveral AFS		
28 Jan 1965	Minuteman II	Cape Canaveral AFS		
7 May 1965	Minuteman II	Cape Canaveral AFS		
25 May 1965	Minuteman II	Cape Canaveral AFS		
3 Aug 1965	Minuteman II	Cape Canaveral AFS		
23 Aug 1965	Minuteman II	Cape Canaveral AFS		
24 Sep 1965	Minuteman II	Cape Canaveral AFS		
1 Oct 1965	Minuteman II	Cape Canaveral AFS		
13 Dec 1966	Minuteman II	Vandenberg AFB, LF-05		First Minuteman ERCS test
2 Feb 1967	Minuteman II	Vandenberg AFB, LF-05		Second Minuteman ERCS test
4 Aug 1970	Minuteman II	Vandenberg AFB, LF-05	GIANT MOON 1, GLORY TRIP 16L	
22 Oct 1971	Minuteman II	Vandenberg AFB, LF-05	GIANT MOON 2, GLORY TRIP 40L	
22 Mar 1972	Minuteman II	Vandenberg AFB, LF-05	GIANT MOON 3, GLORY TRIP 200L	
26 Jul 1973	Minuteman II	Vandenberg AFB, LF-05	GIANT MOON 4	
12 Mar 1974	Minuteman II	Vandenberg AFB, LF-05	GIANT MOON 5	
22 Oct 1974	Minuteman II	Vandenberg AFB, LF-05	GIANT MOON 6	
5 Sep 1975	Minuteman II	Vandenberg AFB, LF-05	GIANT MOON 7	
26 Oct 1976	Minuteman II	Vandenberg AFB, LF-05	GIANT MOON 8	

Airborne Launch Control System (ALCS)-assisted ICBM Launches
Date	Designation	System	Location	Note
3 Mar 1967	BUSY LOBBY	Minuteman	Vandenberg AFB, LF 5	First ALCS-assisted launch
17 Apr 1967	BUSY MISSILE	Minuteman	Vandenberg AFB, LF 08	
28 Apr 1967	BUSY MUMMY	Minuteman	Vandenberg AFB, LF 02	
11 May 1967	BUSY FELLOW	Minuteman	Vandenberg AFB, LF 21	
25 Jan 1968	OLY TRIALS 7	Minuteman II	Vandenberg AFB, LF 22	
12 Mar 1969	GIANT FIST 3	Minuteman II	Vandenberg AFB, LF 04	
18 Apr 1969	SST M-3	Minuteman II	Vandenberg AFB, LF 25	
18 Jun 1969	GLORY TRIP 37B	Minuteman II	Vandenberg AFB, LF 07	
23 Jul 1969	GLORY TRIP 41B	Minuteman II	Vandenberg AFB, LF 07	
26 Aug 1969	GLORY TRIP 15F	Minuteman II	Vandenberg AFB, LF 22	
13 Oct 1969	GLORY TRIP 22F	Minuteman	Vandenberg AFB, LF 24	
21 Oct 1969	GLORY TRIP 45B	Minuteman	Vandenberg AFB, LF 07	
5 Dec 1969	GLORY TRIP 50B	Minuteman	Vandenberg AFB, LF 07	
23 Mar 1970	GLORY TRIP 63B	Minuteman	Vandenberg AFB, LF 07	
21 May 1970	GLORY TRIP 55F	Minuteman	Vandenberg AFB, LF 25	
8 Jun 1970	GLORY TRIP 72B	Minuteman	Vandenberg AFB, LF 07	
9 Jul 1970	GLORY TRIP 66F	Minuteman	Vandenberg AFB, LF 24	
3 Aug 1970	GLORY TRIP 61F	Minuteman	Vandenberg AFB, LF 25	
4 Aug 1970	GLORY TRIP 16L	Minuteman	Vandenberg AFB, LF 05	
26 Aug 1970	GLORY TRIP 43M	Minuteman	Vandenberg AFB, LF 05	

=== GLORY TRIP Launches ===
The USAF Follow-on Test and Evaluation (FOT&E) program for intercontinental ballistic missiles (ICBMs) is designated Glory Trip.

Minuteman IA/B
Date	System	Location	GT Number
Minuteman II
Date	System	Location	GT Number
4 Aug 1970	Minuteman II	Vandenberg AFB, LF-05	16L
4 Feb 1971	Minuteman II	Vandenberg AFB, LF-04	60M
27 Feb 1971	Minuteman II	Vandenberg AFB, LF-04	80M
31 Mar 1971	Minuteman II	Vandenberg AFB, LF-05	82M
22 Oct 1971	Minuteman II	Vandenberg AFB, LF-05	40L
22 Mar 1972	Minuteman II	Vandenberg AFB, LF-05	200L
17 Apr 1973	Minuteman II	Vandenberg AFB, LF-02	112M
Minuteman III
Date	System	Location	GT Number
1978	Minuteman	Vandenberg AFB	63GB
1978	Minuteman	Vandenberg AFB	64GM
1978	Minuteman	Vandenberg AFB	61GM
1978	Minuteman	Vandenberg AFB	37GM
1978	Minuteman	Vandenberg AFB	136M
1978	Minuteman	Vandenberg AFB	133M-1
1978	Minuteman	Vandenberg AFB	65GB
1978	Minuteman	Vandenberg AFB	130M-2
1978	Minuteman	Vandenberg AFB	38GM
27 Feb 1980	Minuteman III	Vandenberg AFB	73GM
1982	Minuteman III	Vandenberg AFB	88GM
31 Mar 1982	Minuteman III	Vandenberg AFB	87GB
29 Mar 1987	Minuteman III	Vandenberg AFB	120GB
25 Jun 1987	Minuteman III	Vandenberg AFB	122GB-1
24 Jul 1987	Minuteman III	Vandenberg AFB	123GM-1
31 Jul 1987	Minuteman III	Vandenberg AFB	124GM
21 Dec 1987	Minuteman III	Vandenberg AFB	119GM-1
21 Dec 1987	Minuteman III	Vandenberg AFB	119GM-1
