= Airborne Launch Control Center =

US Strategic force

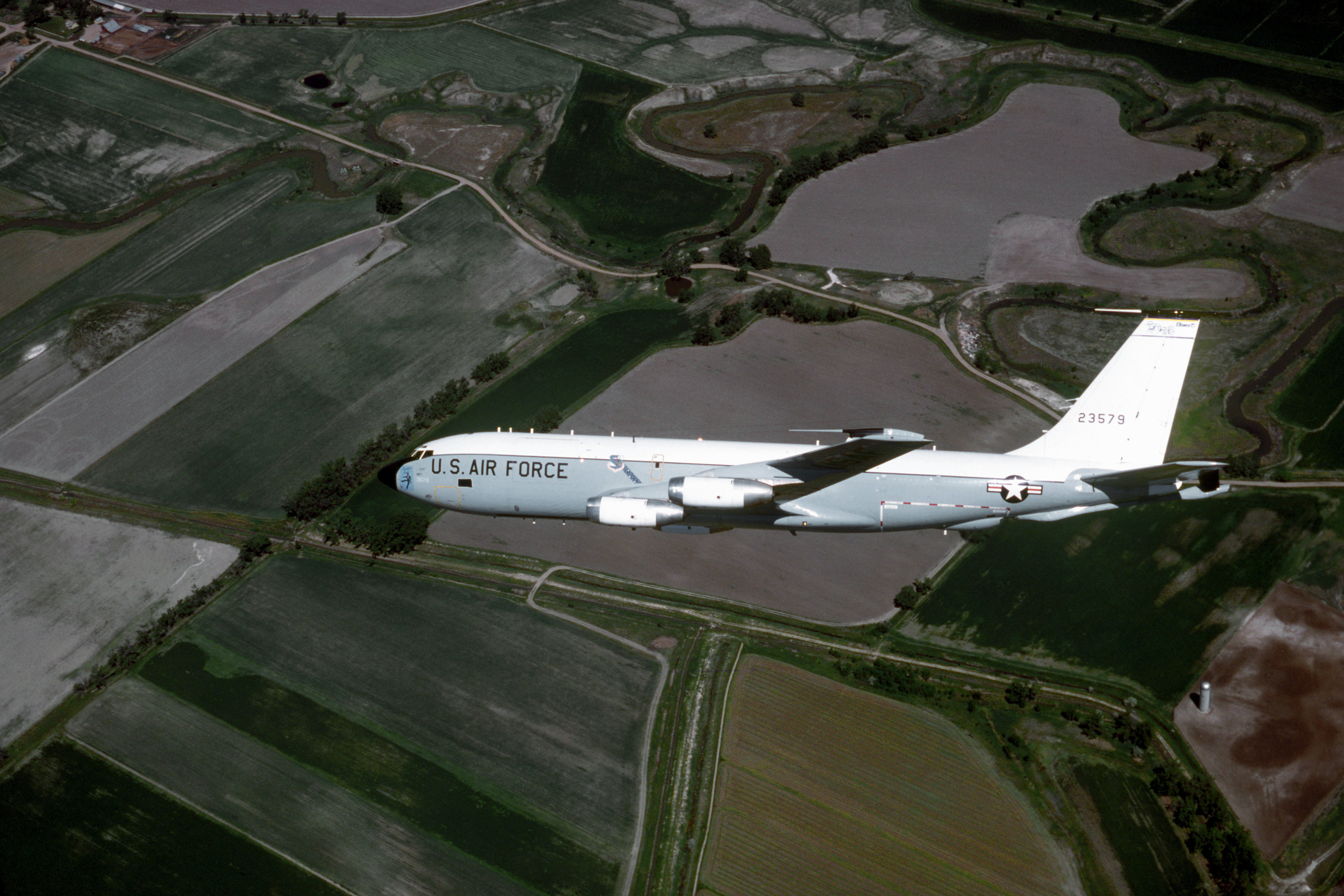
EC-135G ALCC

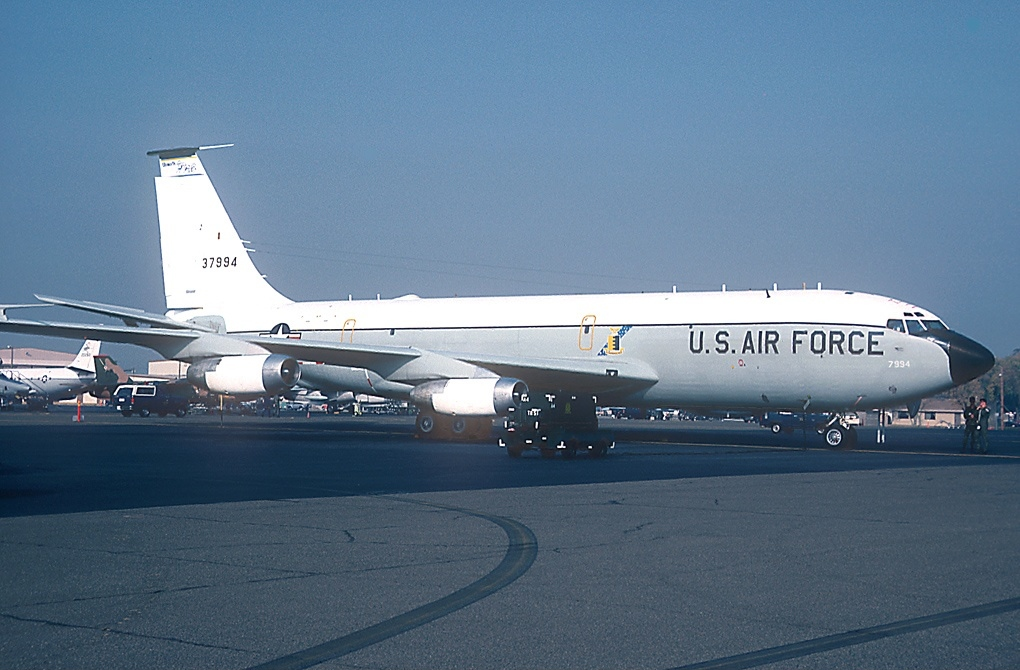
EC-135G at Ellsworth AFB, SD

An Airborne Launch Control Center (ALCC /ˈæl.si/ AL-see) is an aircraft equipped to provide a survivable launch capability for the United States Air Force's LGM-30 Minuteman Intercontinental Ballistic Missile (ICBM) force by utilizing the Airborne Launch Control System (ALCS) on board which is operated by an airborne missileer crew. Historically, from 1967–1998, the ALCC mission was performed by United States Air Force Boeing EC-135 command post aircraft. This included EC-135A, EC-135C, EC-135G, and EC-135L aircraft.

Today, the ALCC mission is performed by airborne missileers from Air Force Global Strike Command's (AFGSC) 625th Strategic Operations Squadron (STOS) and United States Strategic Command (USSTRATCOM). Starting on October 1, 1998, the ALCS has been located on board the United States Navy's E-6B Mercury. The ALCS crew is integrated into the battle staff of the USSTRATCOM "Looking Glass" Airborne Command Post (ABNCP) and is on alert around-the-clock.

== Aircraft ==
The ALCS mission has been held by multiple aircraft during the last 50 years:

- EC-135 – performed Looking Glass and ALCC mission for the Strategic Air Command
  - EC-135A (ALCC)
  - EC-135C (ABNCP and ALCC)
  - EC-135G (ALCC and ABNCP)
  - EC-135L Post Attack Command and Control System (PACCS) Radio Relay
- E-6B Mercury – performs Looking Glass and ALCC mission today for USSTRATCOM

== History ==
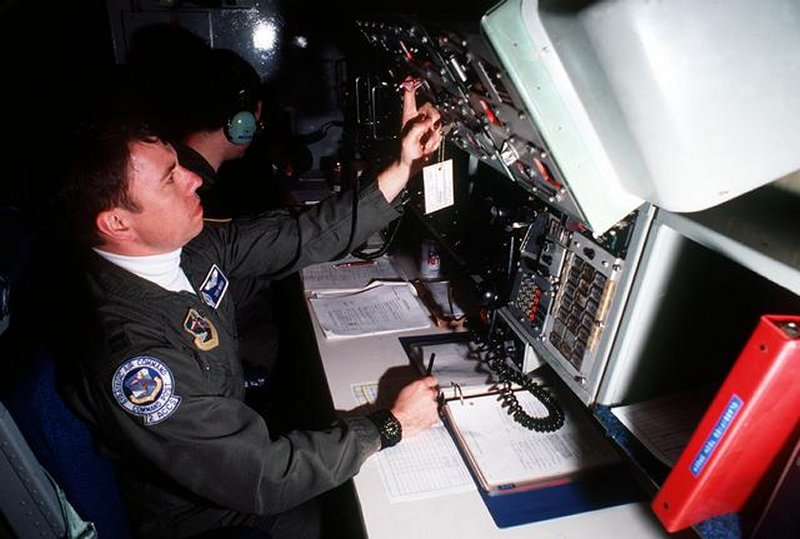
ALCS crewmember from 2 ACCS

From 1967 to 1992, three dedicated Airborne Launch Control Centers (ALCC) were on ground or airborne alert around the clock providing ALCS coverage for five of the six Minuteman ICBM wings. These dedicated ALCCs were mostly EC-135A aircraft but could also have been EC-135C or EC-135G aircraft depending on availability. ALCC No. 1 was on ground alert at Ellsworth AFB, South Dakota, and during a wartime scenario would have taken off and orbited between the Minuteman Wings at Ellsworth AFB, South Dakota, and F.E. Warren AFB, Wyoming, providing ALCS assistance if needed. ALCCs No. 2 and No. 3 were routinely on forward deployed ground alert at Minot AFB, North Dakota. During a wartime scenario, ALCC No. 3 would have orbited between the Minuteman ICBM Wings at Minot AFB and Grand Forks AFB, both in North Dakota, providing ALCS assistance if needed. ALCC No. 2 was dedicated to orbiting near the Minuteman ICBM Wing at Malmstrom AFB, Montana, providing ALCS assistance if needed.

Because of the deployment of ALCCs, by 1972 the US military considered that any enemy first strike attack would need to focus on the missile launch sites.

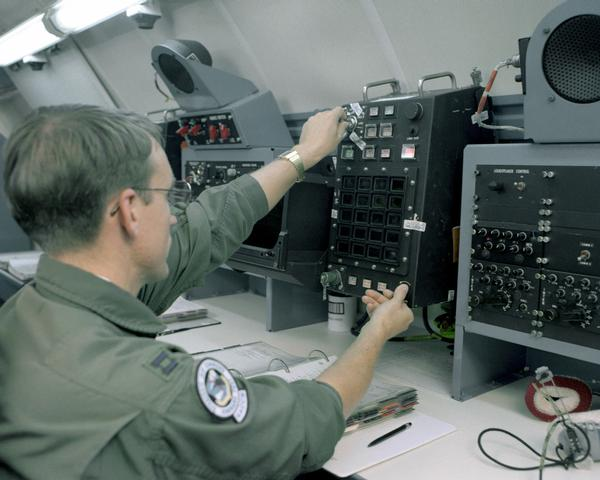
Common ALCS equipment came online in 1987 so that the ALCS could be compatible with the new Peacekeeper ICBM. The Common ALCS equipment is still in use today.

After 1992, with the end of the Cold War and the disbanding of the Strategic Air Command (SAC), ALCS remained on alert with the SAC and the US Strategic Command (USSTRATCOM) EC-135C Airborne Command Posts. On October 1, 1998 the Air Force's EC-135Cs ceased to perform USSTRATCOM Looking Glass operations and was subsequently retired. The Navy's E-6B Mercury took over USSTRATCOM's Looking Glass mission and associated ALCC mission.

== ALCC operations today ==
Today, at least one E-6B Looking Glass Airborne Command Post (ABNCP) is on alert around the clock performing the ALCC mission. It is postured with a full USSTRATCOM battlestaff and ALCS crew on board to perform the Looking Glass mission in the event the USSTRATCOM Global Operations Center (GOC) is incapacitated. The aircraft can take off quickly to avoid any threat. The ALCS crew on board still provides a survivable launch capability for the Air Force's Minuteman III ICBMs located at the three remaining missile wings located at Malmstrom AFB, Montana, Minot AFB, North Dakota; and F.E. Warren AFB, Wyoming. Just like its original inception, ALCS on alert today provides an adversary with the task of trying to destroy the Minuteman ICBM force. Even if the ground Launch Control Centers are destroyed, airborne missileers utilizing the ALCS can fly overhead and launch the Minuteman ICBM force.

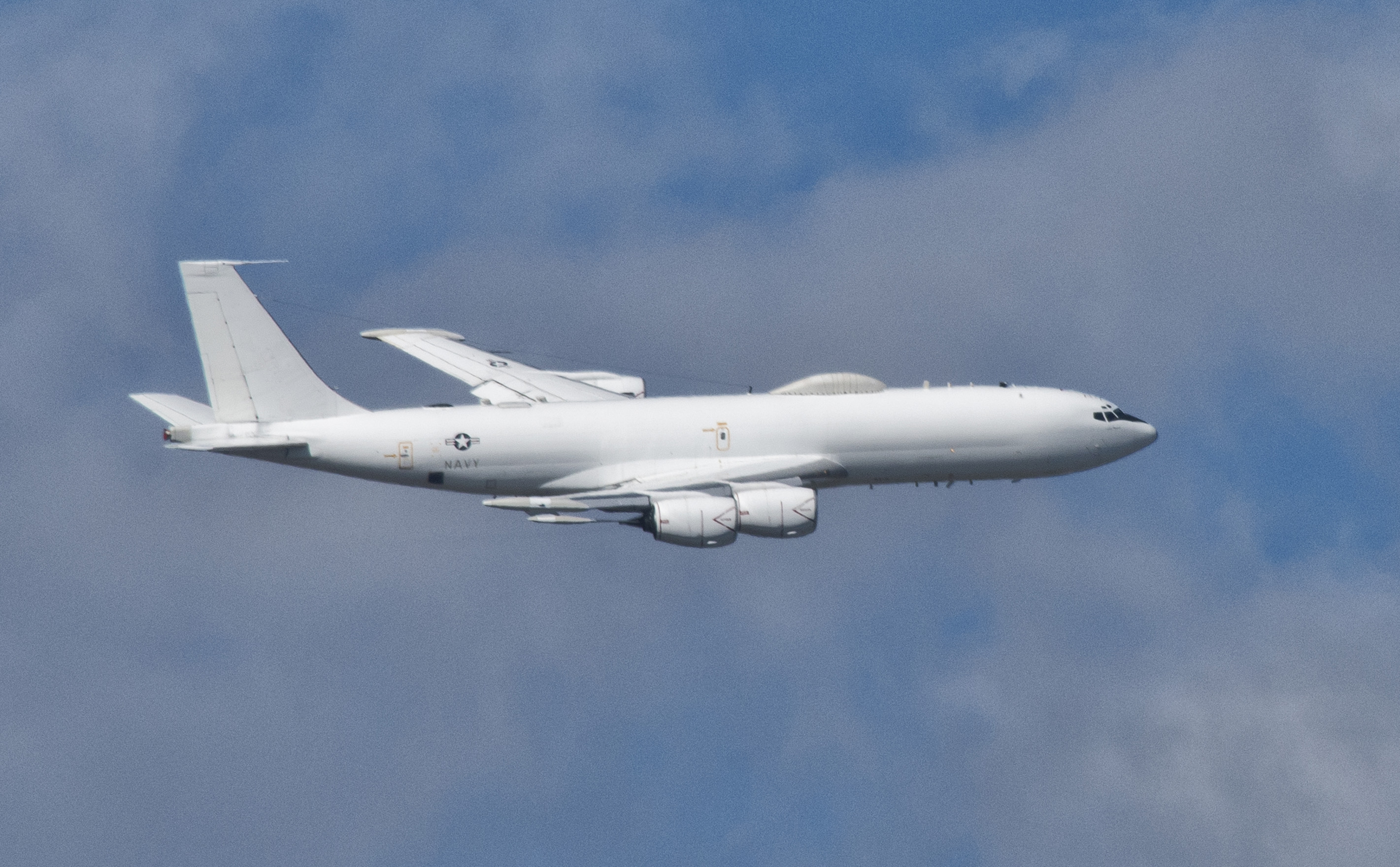
The E-6B Mercury is the current ALCC aircraft.

== See also ==
- AN/DRC-8 Emergency Rocket Communications System
