= 2d Airborne Command and Control Squadron =

2nd Airborne Command and Control Squadron
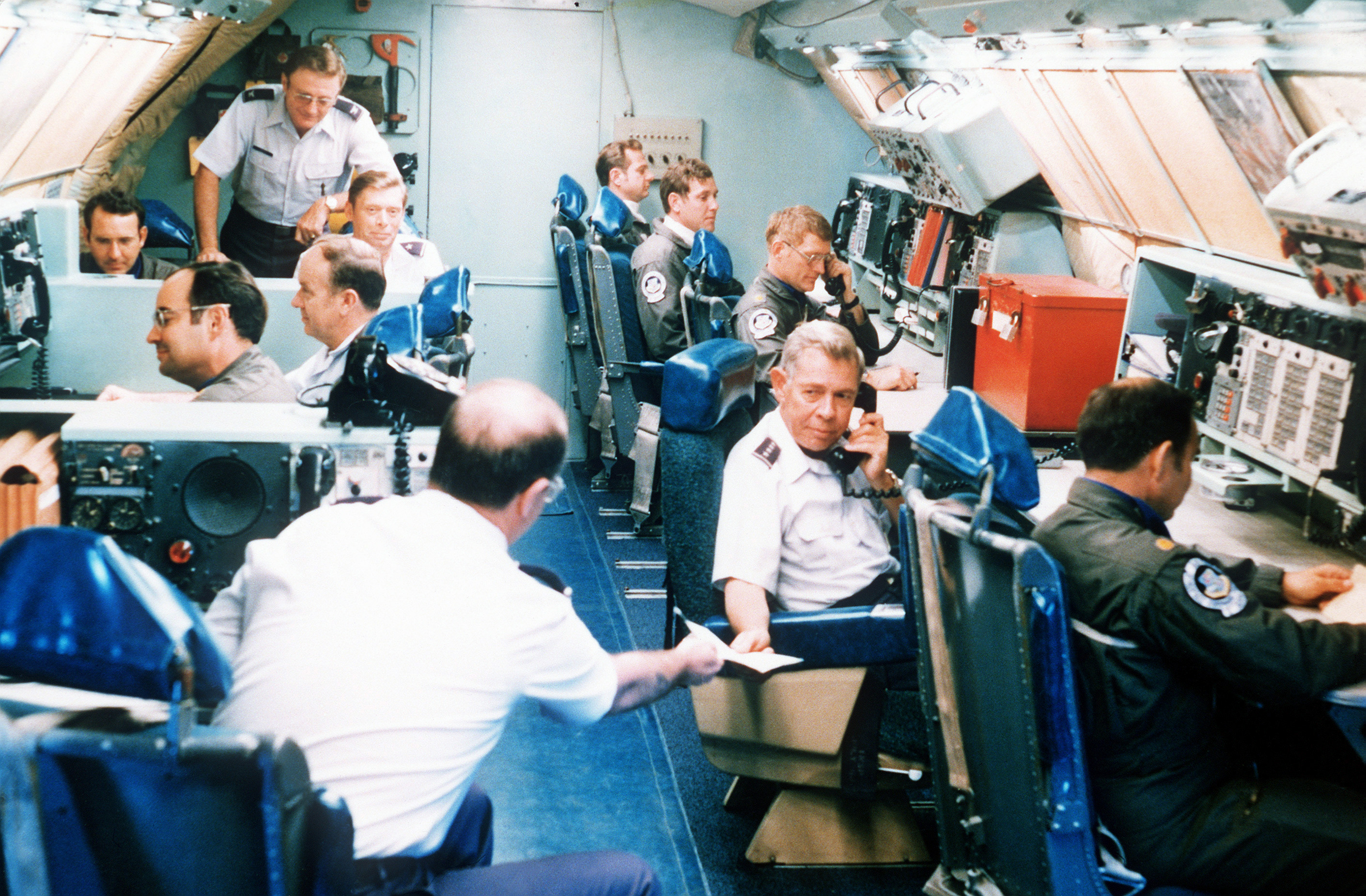
- General Richard H. Ellis, CINCSAC, aboard a squadron EC-135 during an exercise
- Active: 1942–1944; 1949–1952; 1952–1954; 1970–1994
- Disbanded: 1994
- Country: United States
- Branch: United States Air Force
- Role: Command and control
- Part of: Strategic Air Command
- Motto: Parvus Sed Intrepidum (Latin for 'Small but Intrepid') (1952-1954)
- Decorations: Air Force Outstanding Unit Award

Insignia
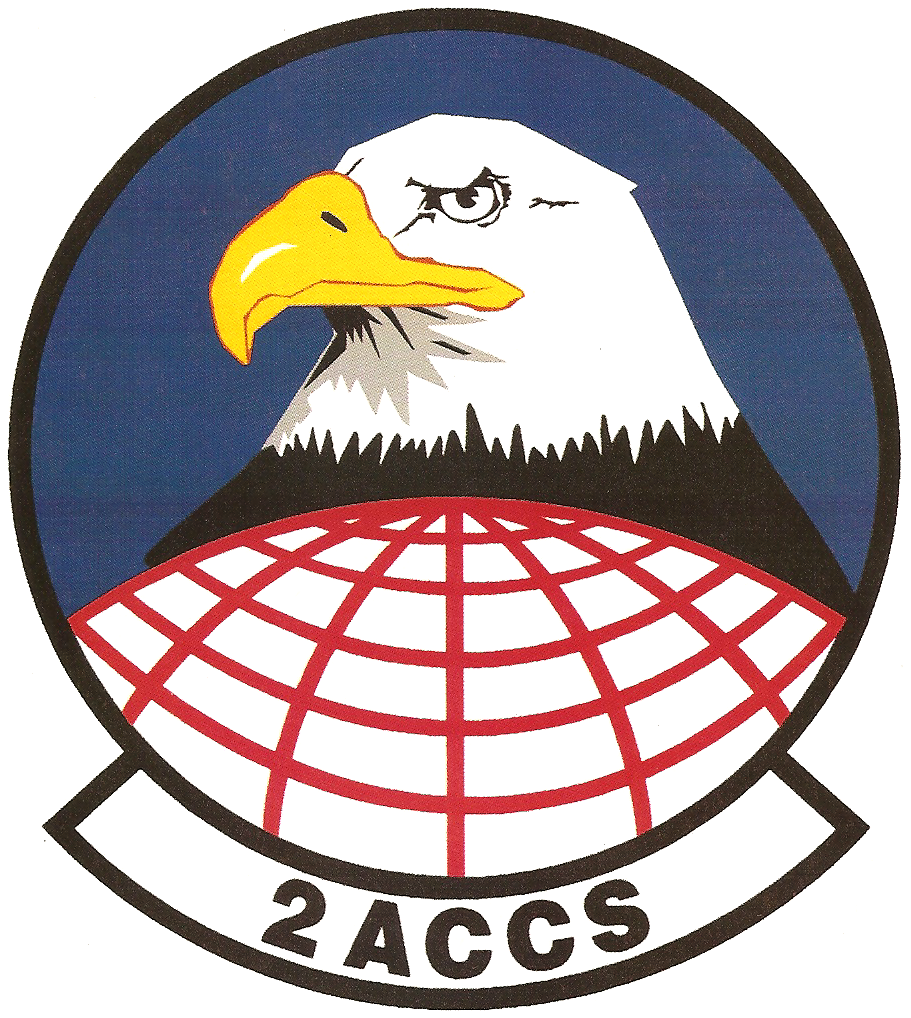
- 2d Airborne Command and Control Squadron emblem (Note: Approved 19 July 1993. Simplified by the removal of the three lightning flashes and star after General McPeak's review of the emblem.)

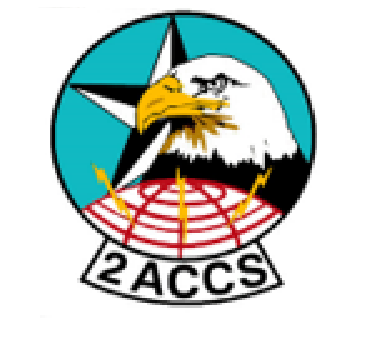
- Original 2d Airborne Command & Control Squadron emblem

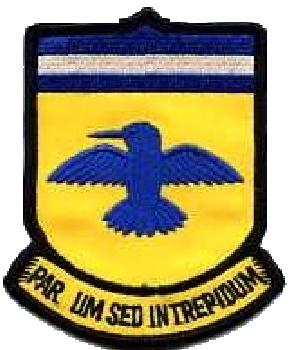
- 2d Liaison Squadron emblem (Note: Approved 13 April 1954.)

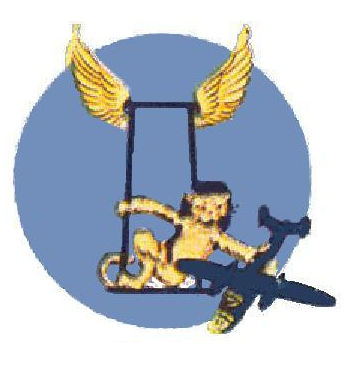
- 2d Ferrying Squadron emblem (Note: Cargill indicates this emblem never received official approval. At the time he prepared the Lineage and Honors statement the emblem for the 2d Airborne Command and Control Squadron had not yet been approved. At that time the only approved emblem was that of the 2d Liaison Squadron.)

Aircraft flown
- EC-135 Looking Glass

The Airborne Command and Control Squadron (Note: From the abbreviation of its name (2 ACCS), the squadron was referred to as "Two Axe".) was an airborne command and control unit of the United States Air Force Strategic Air Command located at SAC HQ at Offutt Air Force Base, Nebraska. Active in its final form during and after the Cold War from 1970-1994, the squadron was an integral part of the United States' Post Attack Command and Control System, performing the Operation Looking Glass mission with the Boeing EC-135 aircraft.

== History ==
=== World War II ===
From its activation in April 1942 until it was disbanded in 1944, the 2d Ferrying Squadron received aircraft at their factory of origin and ferried them to the units to which they were assigned.

=== Liaison duties in the 1950s ===
The 2d Liaison Squadron provided emergency air evacuation, search and rescue, courier and messenger service, routine reconnaissance and transportation of personnel. It regularly operated between Langley Air Force Base, Virginia and Fort John Custis with one Beechcraft C-45 Expeditor and several Stinson L-13s.

In July 1952, the squadron closed at Langley and reopened at Shaw Air Force Base, South Carolina, operating de Havilland Canada L-20 Beavers. It operated a regular courier service to Pope Air Force Base, North Carolina and Myrtle Beach Air Force Base, South Carolina. In 1953, the squadron also began operating Sikorsky H-19 helicopters. The unit was inactivated in June 1954.

=== Airborne Command Post ===
The desire for an Airborne Command Post (ABNCP) to provide survivable command and control of Strategic Air Command's nuclear forces came about in 1958. By 1960, modified KC-135A command post aircraft began pulling alert for SAC under the 34th Air Refueling Squadron (AREFS). On 3 February 1961, Continuous Airborne Operations (CAO) commenced, which meant that there was always at least one Looking Glass aircraft airborne at all times. Starting in 1966, the 38th Strategic Reconnaissance Squadron took over the Looking Glass mission. Eventually, on 1 April 1970, the 2nd ACCS took over the Looking Glass mission flying EC-135C ABNCP aircraft for the duration of the Cold War as a critical member in the Post Attack Command and Control System. There continued to be at least one Looking Glass aircraft airborne at all times providing a backup to SAC's underground command post. Additionally, the 2 ACCS maintained an additional EC-135C on ground alert at Offutt AFB, NE as the EASTAUXCP (East Auxiliary Command Post), providing backup to the airborne Looking Glass, radio relay capability, and a means for the Commander in Chief of SAC to escape an enemy nuclear attack.

The 2nd ACCS was also a major player in Airborne Launch Control System operations. The primary mission of the 2nd ACCS was to fly the SAC ABNCP Looking Glass aircraft in continuous airborne operations, however, due to its close proximity in orbiting over the central US, the airborne Looking Glass provided ALCS coverage for the Minuteman Wing located at Whiteman AFB, MO. Not only did Whiteman AFB have Minuteman II ICBMs, but it also had ERCS configured Minuteman missiles on alert. The EASTAUXCP was ALCS capable, however, it did not have a dedicated ALCS mission.

== Lineage ==
2d Ferrying Squadron

- Constituted as the 2d Air Corps Ferrying Squadron on 18 February 1942

Activated on 16 April 1942

- Redesignated 2d Ferrying Squadron on 12 May 1943
- Disbanded on 31 March 1944
- Reconstituted and consolidated with 2d Liaison Squadron and 2d Airborne Command and Control Squadron as the 2d Airborne Command and Control Squadron on 19 September 1985

2d Liaison Squadron

- Constituted as the 2d Liaison Flight on 27 September 1949

Activated on 25 October 1949

- Redesignated 2d Liaison Squadron on 15 July 1952

Inactivated on 22 July 1952
Activated on 22 July 1952
Inactivated on 18 June 1954

- Consolidated with 2d Ferrying Squadron and 2d Airborne Command and Control Squadron as the 2d Airborne Command and Control Squadron on 19 September 1985

2d Airborne Command and Control Squadron

- Constituted as the 2d Airborne Command and Control Squadron on 12 March 1970

Activated on 1 April 1970

- Consolidated with 2d Ferrying Squadron and 2d Liaison Squadron on 19 September 1985
- Inactivated on 19 July 1994

=== Assignments ===
- Midwest Sector, Air Corps Ferrying Command (later 5th Ferrying Group, 16 April 1942 – 31 March 1944
- Ninth Air Force, 25 October 1949 (attached to 4th Fighter Wing (later 4th Fighter-Interceptor Wing))
- Tactical Air Command, 1 August 1950 – 22 July 1952 (remained attached to 4th Fighter-Interceptor Wing to 1 September 1950, attached to 363d Tactical Reconnaissance Wing 1 September 1950, 47th Bombardment Wing 12 March 1951, 4430th Air Base Wing after 12 February 1952)
- Ninth Air Force, 22 July 1952 – 18 June 1954 (attached to 363d Tactical Reconnaissance Wing)
- 55th Strategic Reconnaissance Wing, 1 April 1970
- 55th Operations Group, 1 September 1992 – 19 July 1994

=== Stations ===
- Hensley Field, Texas (18 February 1942)
- Love Field, Texas, 8 September 1942
- Fairfax Airport, Kansas, 16 January 1943 – 31 March 1944
- Langley Air Force Base, Virginia, 25 October 1949 – 22 July 1952
- Shaw Air Force Base, South Carolina, 22 July 1952 – 18 June 1954
- Offutt Air Force Base, Nebraska, 1 April 1970 – 19 July 1994

=== Awards and campaigns ===
- Air Force Outstanding Unit Award
  - 1 July 1970 – 30 June 1971
  - 1 July 1972 – 30 June 1974
  - 1 July 1974 – 30 June 1976
  - 1 July 1976 – 30 June 1978
  - 1 July 1978 – 30 June 1980

=== Aircraft & Missiles Operated ===
- Various aircraft (1942–1944)
- Beechcraft C-45 Expeditor (1949–1952)
- Stinson L-13 (1949–1952)
- de Havilland Canada L-20 Beaver (1952–1954)
- Sikorsky H-19 (1953–1954)
- Boeing EC-135 (1970–1994)

== See also ==
- Airborne Launch Control System
- Survivable Low Frequency Communications System
- Ground Wave Emergency Network
- Minimum Essential Emergency Communications Network
- Emergency Rocket Communications System
- The Cold War
- Game theory
- Continuity of government
- 1st Airborne Command Control Squadron
