= Green Pine =

Green Pine may refer to:

- EL/M-2080 Green Pine, electronically scanned radar used by the Israeli military for anti-ballistic missiles
- Green Pine (communications), network of low frequency radio transmission sites, used by the Strategic Air Command
- Ching Chung Koon (青松觀, "Green Pine Temple"), prominent Taoist temple in Tuen Mun district, Hong Kong. Also have several branch temples with similar name in oversea
- Cinema of Turkey (Green Pine)

== See also ==
- Pine green, a color
