= Alternate Reconstitution Base =

An Alternate Reconstitutional Base (ARB) is a concept used during the Cold War by the United States Air Force's Strategic Air Command (SAC) for the rearming of nuclear bombers. The idea was, after a nuclear exchange, primary SAC airfields would be destroyed and returning bombers would have no location to rearm their stores and reattack additional targets. ARB allowed trained teams to depart their home installation and create landing locations for returning bombers.

== Civilian airfields ==
A few civilian airfields, such as Clinton-Sherman Airport, were originally SAC bases. The long-length runways were maintained, as well as the Christmas tree alert structure for possible reuse by SAC forces in the event of nuclear war.

== Training ==
Various SAC communications squadrons would conduct ARB training by installing a mobile high frequency radio set at a pre-planned site and establish a communications net.

== See also ==
- Post Attack Command and Control System
- Headquarters Emergency Relocation Team
- 55th Mobile Command and Control Squadron
