= Green Pine (communications) =

Military communications system

The Green Pine UHF communications system was designed to relay Strategic Air Command (SAC) Emergency Action Messages (EAMs) to SAC aircraft. Green Pine was designed in 1967. Each Green Pine station was equipped with a variety of communications systems, to ensure that nuclear command and control messages would reach nuclear strategic bombers in northern latitudes.

== Locations ==
- Adak, Alaska
- Naval Station Argentia, Newfoundland
- Barter Island
- Cambridge Bay
- Cape Dyer
- Cape Parry
- Cold Bay
- Dye 3
- Hall Beach
- Melville
- Keflavik, Iceland
- Point Barrow
- Thule, Greenland

== See also ==
- Survivable Low Frequency Communications System (SLFCS)
- Post Attack Command and Control System (PACCS)
- Ground Wave Emergency Network (GWEN)
- Minimum Essential Emergency Communications Network (MEECN)
- Emergency Rocket Communications System (ERCS)
