= Post-Attack Command and Control System =

Former US nuclear communications network

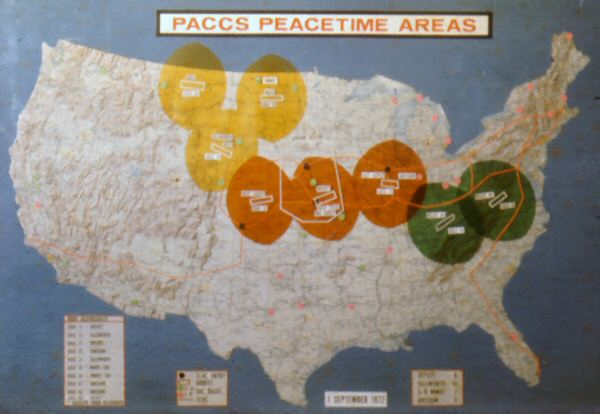
Peacetime orbits of PACCS aircraft, c. 1972

The Post Attack Command and Control System (PACCS) was a network of communication sites (both ground and airborne) for use before, during and after a nuclear attack on the United States. PACCS was designed to ensure that National Command Authority would retain exclusive and complete control over American nuclear weapons. Among other components, it included Strategic Air Command assets such as the Looking Glass aircraft and mission, and various hardened command and control facilities.

Belief by the Soviet Union in the reliability of PACCS was a crucial component of the American mutual assured destruction doctrine, ensuring a long-term stalemate.

== History ==
The Strategic Air Command headquarters staff, under the direction of General Thomas S. Power assessed the feasibility of placing a continuous command and control element in an airborne mode. The purpose of such a system would be to use the aircraft as a platform for specially installed communications equipment to ensure delivery of command directives to SAC strike forces in the event ground-based headquarters were destroyed.

The original plan envisioned an aircraft, crew, and command and control team on 15-minute ground alert. This was later changed to a continuous airborne alert posture. The functions of this PACCS Airborne Command Post kept expanding until it became a true alternate command and control system, complete with force status monitoring, initiation or relay of launch/execution directives, a battle staff, communications to support an alternate CINCSAC, and limited capabilities to reconstitute and replan residual resources.

PACCS, in later variants, included an Airborne Launch Control System (ALCS) capability, which provided an alternate means for execution message delivery to missile combat crews and a back-up launch control center, forcing the Soviet Union to target each missile silo, rather than just the launch control centers, to incapacitate the Minuteman force.

== Components ==
=== Airborne ===
- E-4B National Emergency Airborne Command Post (NEACP)
  - 1st Airborne Command and Control Squadron - Offutt Air Force Base, Nebraska
- EC-135 Airborne Command Post (ABNCP) "Looking Glass"
  - 2d Airborne Command and Control Squadron - Offutt Air Force Base, Nebraska
  - 4th Airborne Command and Control Squadron - Ellsworth Air Force Base, South Dakota
  - 22d Air Refueling Squadron - March Air Force Base, California; West Auxiliary Command Post (West AUXCP)
    - Ground Entry Point - Lamar, Colorado
  - 99th Air Refueling Squadron - Westover Air Force Base, Massachusetts; East Auxiliary Command Post (East AUXCP)
    - Ground Entry Point - Plano, Illinois
  - 913th Air Refueling Squadron - Barksdale Air Force Base, Louisiana; Central Auxiliary Command Post (Central AUX)
    - Ground Entry Point - Lyons, Nebraska
- EB-47L
  - 4362d Post Attack Command and Control Squadron - Lincoln Air Force Base, Nebraska
  - 4363d Post Attack Command and Control Squadron - Lockbourne Air Force Base, Ohio
  - 4364th Post Attack Command and Control Squadron - Mountain Home Air Force Base, Idaho
  - 4365th Post Attack Command and Control Squadron - Plattsburgh Air Force Base, New York

=== Ground ===
- Barksdale Air Force Base, Louisiana (Second Air Force (later Eighth Air Force) Command Post)
- Westover Air Force Base, Massachusetts (Eighth Air Force Combat Operations Center, aka "The Notch")
- March Air Force Base, California (Fifteenth Air Force Command Post)
- Grissom Air Force Base, Indiana
- Offutt Air Force Base, Nebraska (Strategic Air Command Headquarters)
  - Headquarters Emergency Relocation Team (HERT) - Cornhusker Army Ammunition Plant, Grand Island, Nebraska

=== Communications ===
- Survivable Low Frequency Communications System - VLF/LF
- Alpha and Bravo Nets - High Frequency
- Green Pine
- Emergency Rocket Communications System

== Gallery ==
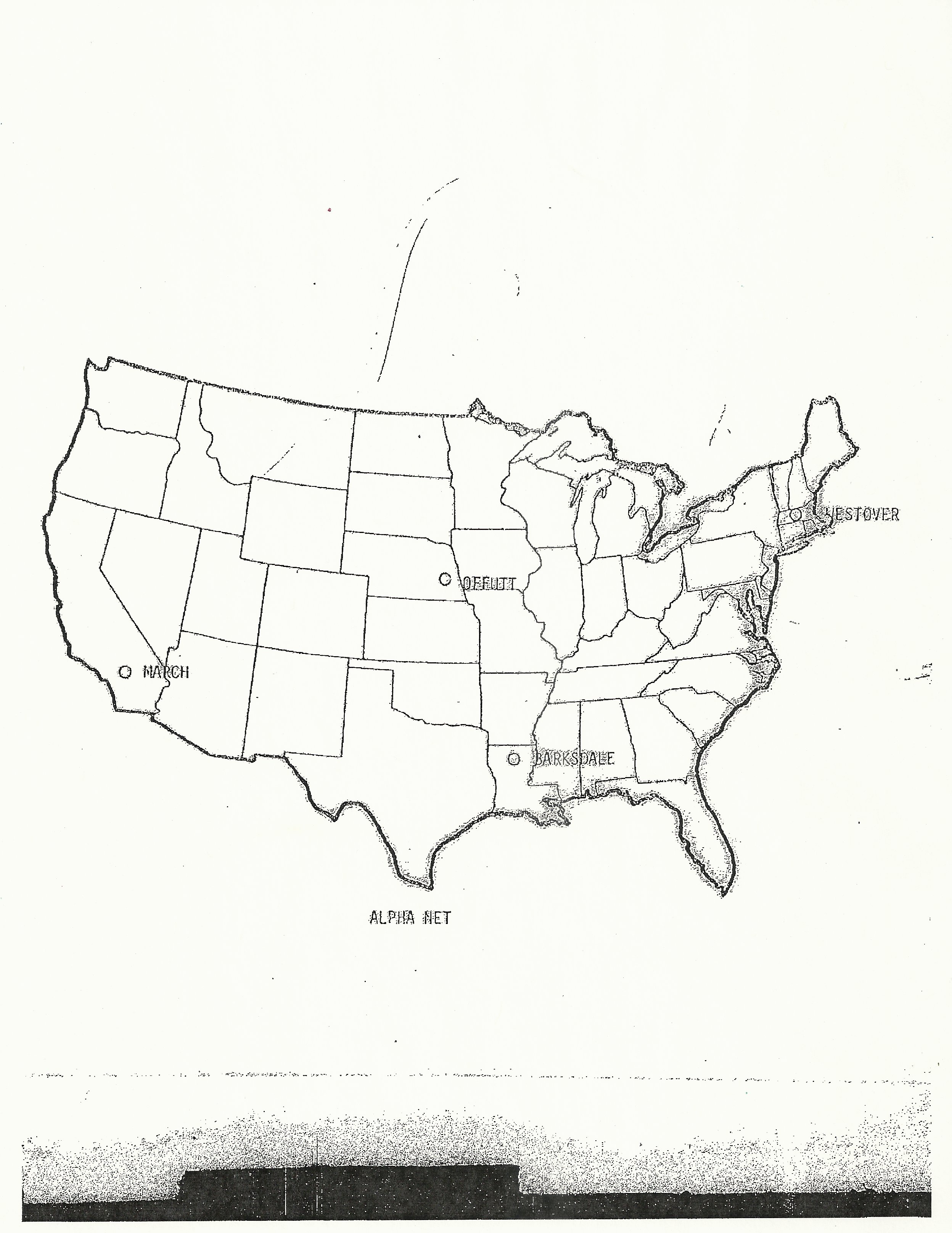
ALPHA Net stations

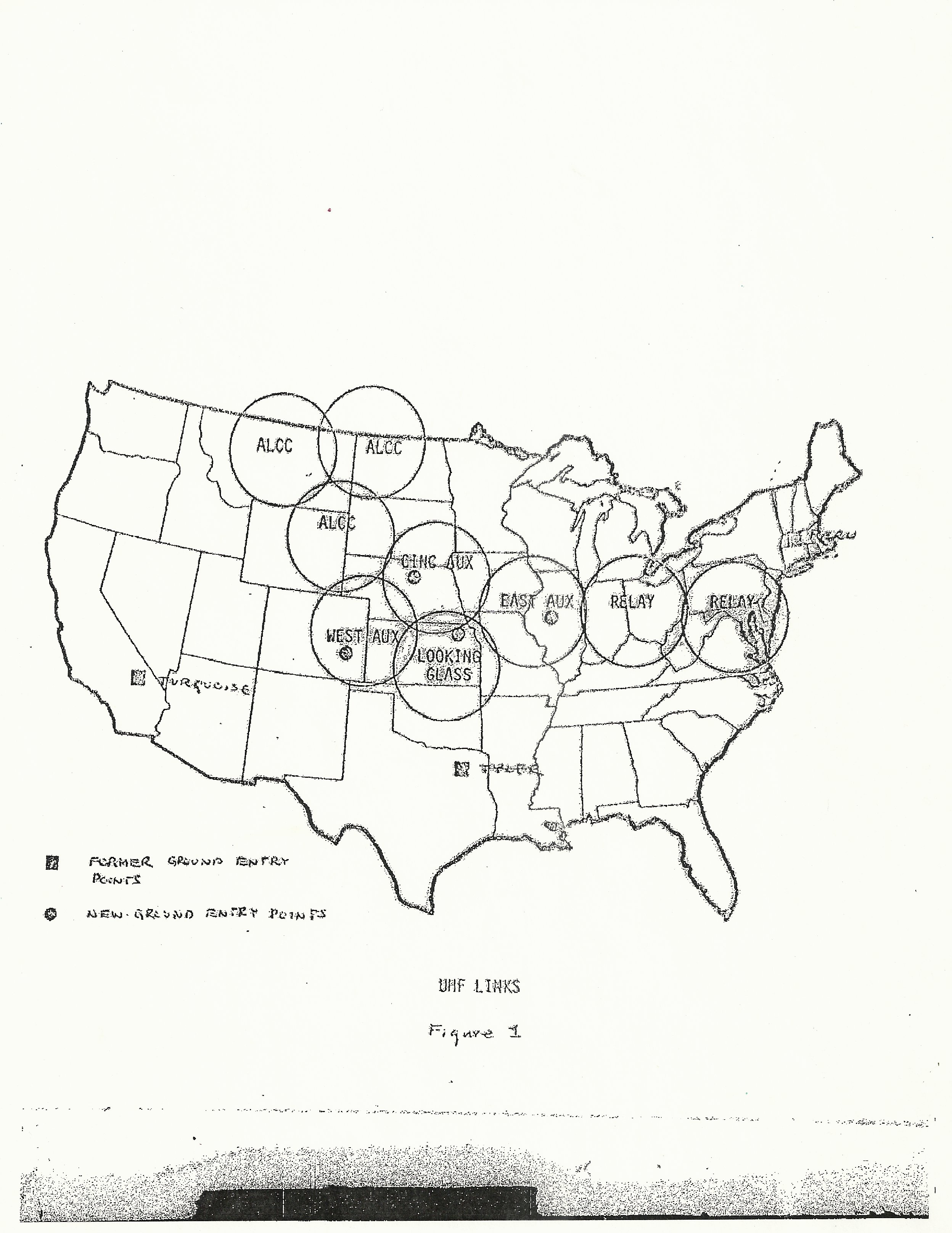
PACCS UHF Links

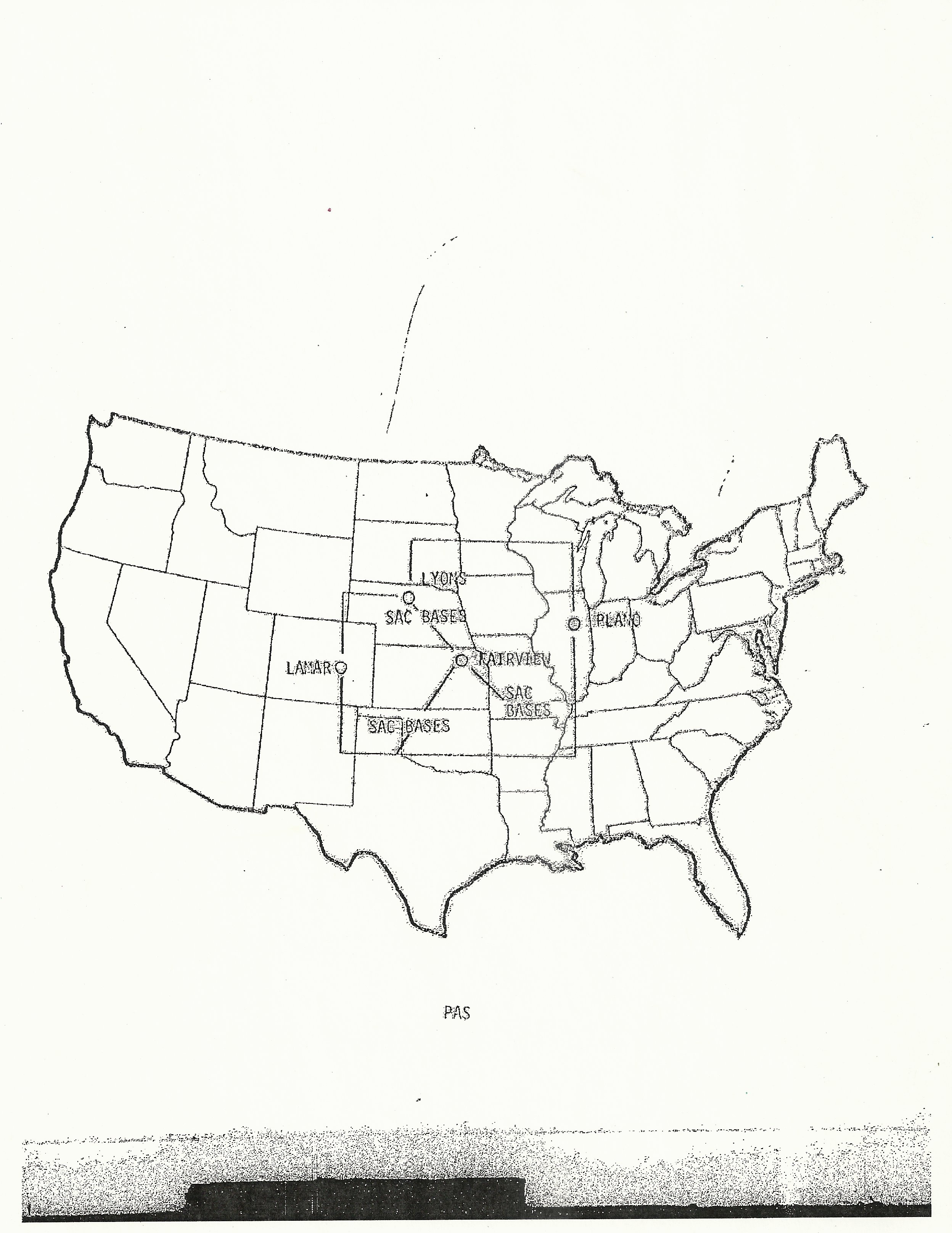
PACCS Primary Alert System

== See also ==
- Airborne Launch Control Center
- Survivable Low Frequency Communications System (SLFCS)
- AN/URC-117 Ground Wave Emergency Network (GWEN)
- Minimum Essential Emergency Communications Network (MEECN)
- AN/DRC-8 Emergency Rocket Communications System (ERCS)
- Alternate Reconstitution Base (ARB)
- Cold War
- Game theory
- Continuity of government
