= 38th Reconnaissance Squadron =

38th Reconnaissance Squadron

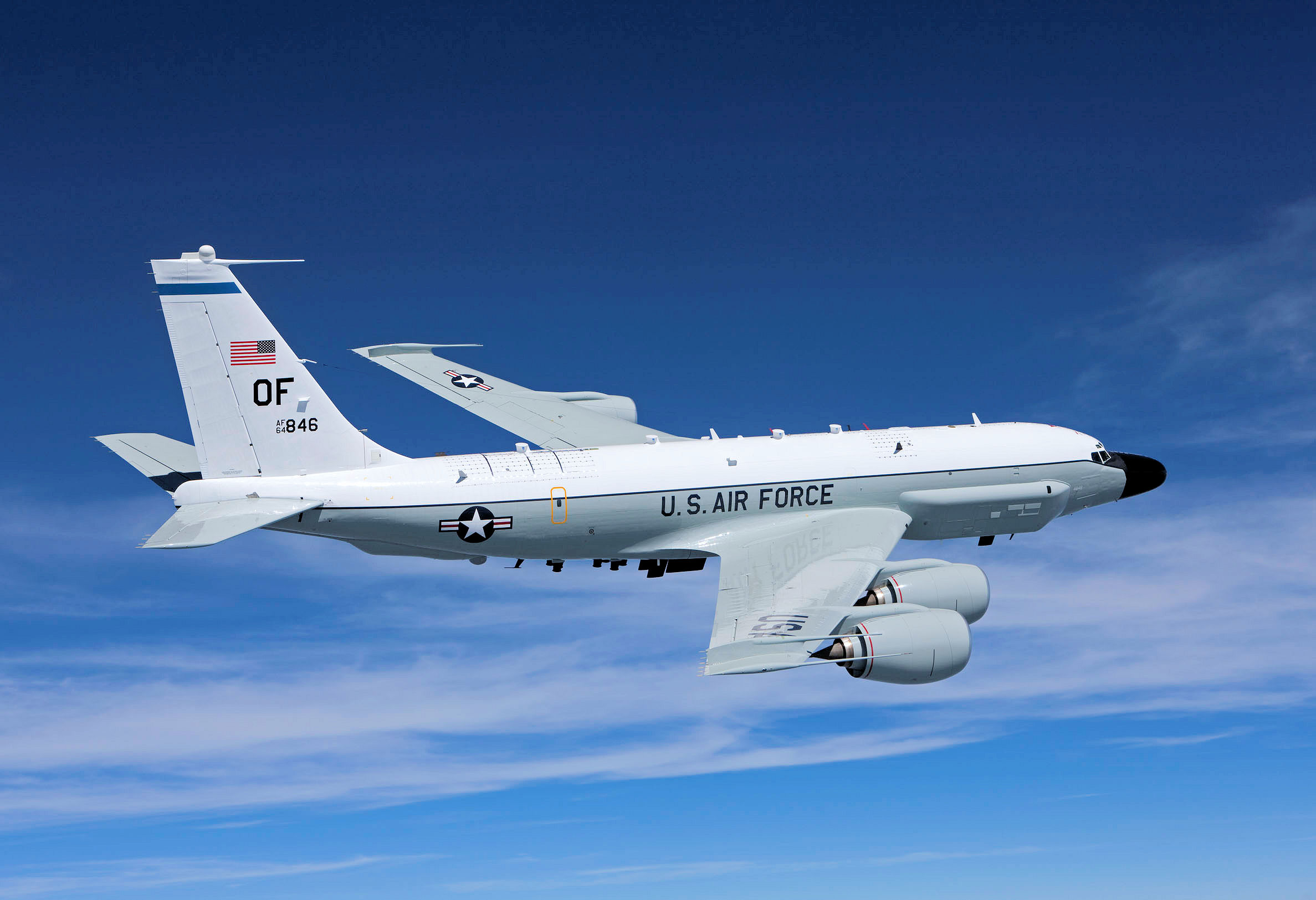
- 38th Reconnaissance Squadron RC-135V Rivet Joint electronic intelligence aircraft (Note: Aircraft is Boeing RC-135V Rivet Joint serial 64-14846.)
- Active: 1941–1946; 1947–1949; 1950–1970; 1979–present
- Country: United States
- Branch: United States Air Force
- Role: Reconnaissance and Surveillance
- Part of: Air Combat Command
- Garrison/HQ: Offutt Air Force Base
- Mottos: Ducimus Ceteri Sequuntur (Latin for 'We Lead, Others Follow') (1957-1994)
- Engagements: European Theater of Operations; Iraq War; Global war on terrorism
- Decorations: Distinguished Unit Citation; Air Force Meritorious Unit Award; Air Force Outstanding Unit Award

Insignia
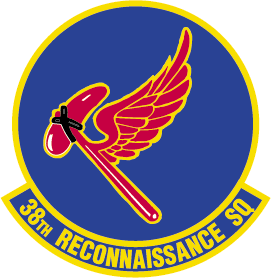
- 38th Reconnaissance Squadron emblem (Note: restored and modified 22 February 1994)

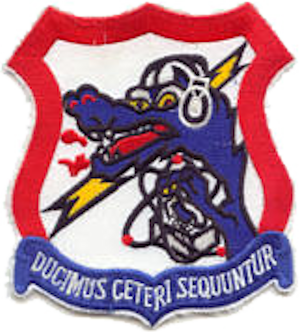
- 38th Strategic Reconnaissance Squadron emblem (Note: Approved 24 May 1957. Description: On a white shield bordered red an A[ir] F[orce] blue lightning bolt in bend sinister surmounted by a dragon's head issuing from sinister base A[ir] F[orce] blue, tongue, mouth, fire from mouth, nostrils, nose markings and pupils of the eyes of the second [color mentioned]. talons and iris of eyes A[ir] F[orce] yellow, eyeball and teeth white; heavy eyebrows and facial outlines black wearing earphones white, with black detail and head strap; carrying in his talons an electronic symbol of three black entwined orbits with three nuclei red, entwined around an electronic testing box white, instruments outlined black.)

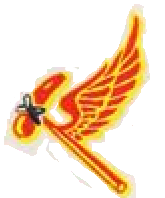
- 38th Pursuit Squadron emblem (Note: Approved 3 March 1942.)

The 38th Reconnaissance Squadron is a United States Air Force unit. It is a part of the 55th Wing at Offutt Air Force Base, Nebraska. It operates the Boeing RC-135 aircraft conducting reconnaissance missions.

== Mission ==
The mission of the 38th Reconnaissance Squadron is to provide RC-135 aircraft and personnel to conduct global reconnaissance for national intelligence agencies, key decision makers and warfighters.

== History ==
=== World War II ===
Established in late 1942 as a Lockheed P-38 Lightning fighter squadron, trained under Second Air Force in the Pacific northwest. Deployed to the European Theater of Operations, assigned to VIII Fighter Command in England in late 1943. Squadron's mission was to provide long range fighter escort for Boeing B-17 Flying Fortress and Consolidated B-24 Liberator heavy bombers on strategic bombing missions over Occupied Europe and Nazi Germany. In April 1944 received P-51D Mustang fighter aircraft and continuing its primary task of escorting B-17 and B-24 bombers that attacked such targets as industries and marshalling yards in Germany, and airfields and V-weapon sites in France.

The squadron flew air patrols over the English Channel and bombed bridges in the Tours area during the Invasion of France in June 1944. In July the squadron attacked gun emplacements during the Saint-Lô breakthrough. The unit patrolled the Arnhem sector to support the Airborne invasion of the Netherlands in September 1944, and later in December, transportation facilities during the Battle of the Bulge. During the Western Allied invasion of Germany, the squadron flew ground support missions by strafing trucks, locomotives, and oil depots near Wesel when the Allies crossed the Rhine in March 1945 and continued offensive operations until 21 April 1945.

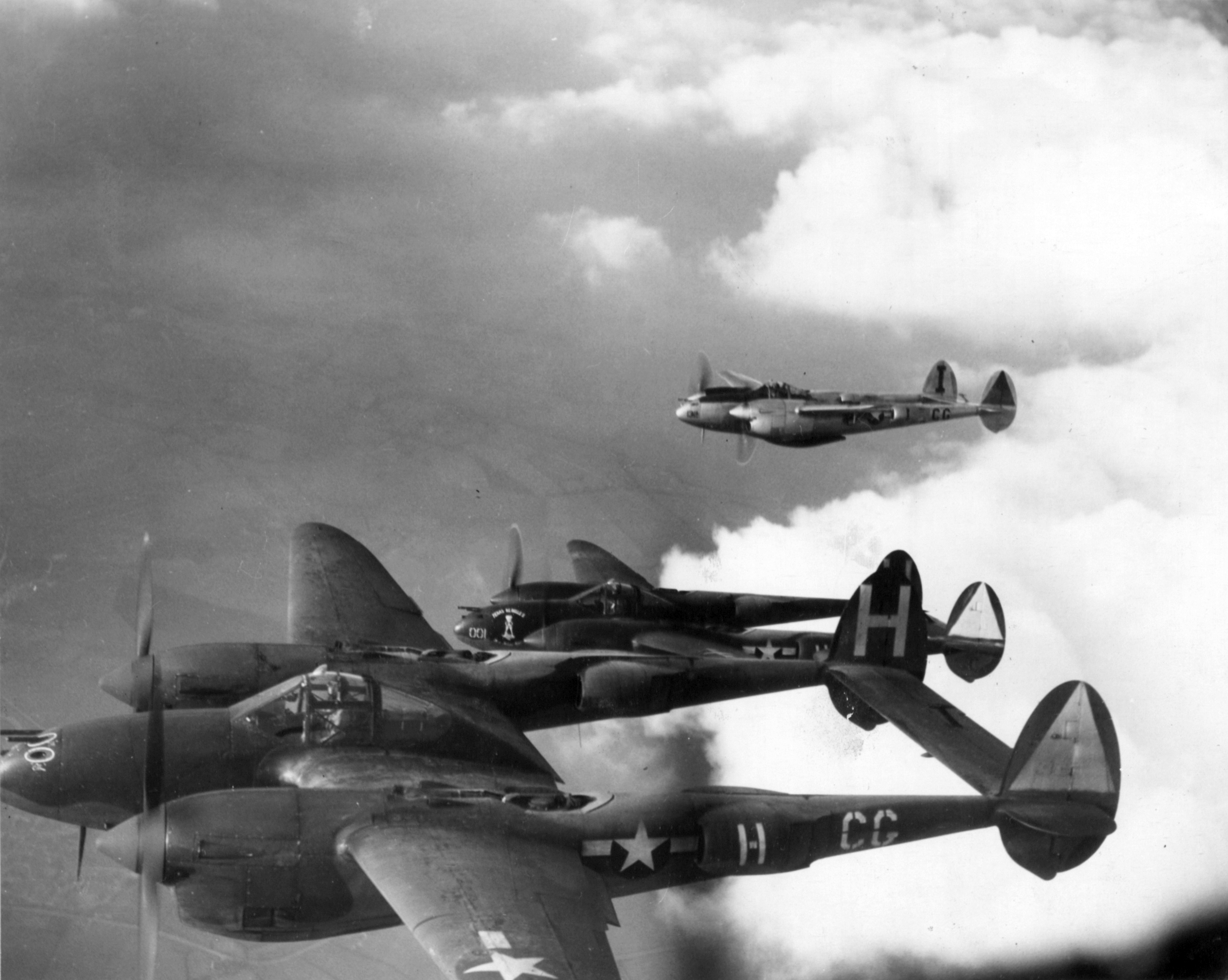
P-38Hs of the 38th Fighter Squadron.

After the German Capitulation, became part of the United States Air Forces in Europe Army of Occupation, at AAF Station Kaufbeuren, then moved to AAF Station Giebelstadt in early 1946 where it received its first jet aircraft, the Lockheed P-80A Shooting Star. Inactivated in August 1946 when personnel were demobilized and aircraft were transferred to the 31st Fighter Group.

=== Cold War reconnaissance ===
The squadron was reactivated by Strategic Air Command in 1947 as a reconnaissance squadron, equipped with Boeing RB-17 Flying Fortress aircraft. It flew aerial photography, mapping, charting, and photo reconnaissance missions, some of which flew around borders of the Soviet Union and over the Soviet Occupation Zone of Germany. Little was known about the air defense capability of the Soviet Union at this time and the most effective way of determining their capability was to probe the borders and see whether they would respond. Gradually the RB-17s and other aircraft mapped the perimeter of the Soviet Air Defenses from the Baltic Sea to the Sea of Okhotsk, north of Japan.

The squadron was upgraded to Boeing RB-29 Superfortress aircraft in 1949 and continued its reconnaissance mission. However, it was again inactivated in 1949 due to budget reductions.

The squadron was again reactivated in 1950 at Ramey Air Force Base, Puerto Rico, again flying RB-29s performing strategic reconnaissance, charting photography, precise electronic geodetic mapping, and electronic reconnaissance missions, upgrading to Boeing RB-50 Superfortresses in 1952.

In 1953, the squadron was equipped with Boeing RB-47E Stratojets and conducted a variety of classified overflights of the Soviet Union during the 1950s. Some of these flights were mounted from Thule in Greenland and probed deep into the heart of the Soviet Union, taking a photographic and radar recording of the route attacking SAC bombers would follow to reach their targets. Flights which involved penetrating mainland Russia were termed SENSINT (Sensitive Intelligence) missions. One RB-47 even managed to fly 450 miles inland and photograph the city of Igarka in Siberia. Beginning in 1958, used 3 specially modified Stratojets, known as EB-47Es (Tell Two), in Operation Iron Work to monitor Soviet missile tests from Baikonur, Tyuratam and Kapustin Yar. The early EB-47E 'Tell Two' was easily recognizable as the aircraft were equipped with 2 large telemetry pods attached to either side of the fuselage, just aft of the nose, which intercepted data from Soviet data from missile tests. A later version of the 'Tell Two' housed the telemetry pods internally and had a streamlined nose. The USAF long range radar site at Samsum in Turkey, on the south coast of the Black Sea, also assisted in this activity.

Missions flown on a reduced scale after February 1958 when events showed the vulnerability of the RB-47 to Soviet air defenses and the development of the U-2 aircraft.

When the 55th Strategic Reconnaissance Wing relocated to Offutt Air Force Base on 16 August 1966, the 38th took over the Operation Looking Glass mission from the 34th Air Refueling Squadron and operated Boeing EC-135C as well as operating 3 KC-135R Rivet Stand reconnaissance aircraft. On 1 April 1970 SAC reorganized the Post Attack Command and Control mission and the 38th inactivated and turned the mission over to the newly 2d Airborne Command and Control Squadron.

The squadron flew worldwide strategic reconnaissance including in support of the Cuban Missile Crisis in October 1962, Operation Urgent Fury in October 1983, Operation El Dorado Canyon in April 1986, Operation Just Cause in December 1989, and Operations Desert Shield and Desert Storm from January–February 1991.

== Lineage ==
- Constituted as the 38th Pursuit Squadron (Interceptor) on 20 November 1940

Activated on 15 January 1941
Redesignated 38th Pursuit Squadron (Interceptor) (Twin Engine) on 31 January 1942
Redesignated 38th Fighter Squadron (Twin Engine) on 15 May 1942
Redesignated 38th Fighter Squadron, Twin Engine on 20 August 1943
Redesignated 38th Fighter Squadron, Single Engine on 5 September 1944
Inactivated on 20 August 1946
Redesignated 38th Reconnaissance Squadron, Very Long Range, Mapping on 3 February 1947
Activated on 15 March 1947
Redesignated 38th Strategic Reconnaissance Squadron, Photo-Mapping on 1 July 1949
Inactivated on 14 October 1949
Redesignated 38th Strategic Reconnaissance Squadron, Medium, Photo on 27 October 1950
Activated on 1 November 1950
Redesignated 38th Strategic Reconnaissance Squadron, Medium on 16 June 1952
Redesignated 38th Strategic Reconnaissance Squadron on 16 August 1966
Inactivated on 1 April 1970
Activated on 1 April 1979
Redesignated 38th Reconnaissance Squadron on 1 September 1991

=== Assignments ===
- 55th Pursuit Group (later 55th Fighter Group), 15 January 1941 – 20 August 1946
- 5th Reconnaissance Group, 15 March 1947
- 311th Air Division, 26 May 1949 (attached to 9th Strategic Reconnaissance Wing)
- 55th Strategic Reconnaissance Group, 1 June–14 October 1949
- 55th Strategic Reconnaissance Group, 1 November 1950 (attached to 91st Strategic Reconnaissance Wing until 6 January 1951, then to 55th Strategic Reconnaissance Wing)

Further attached to 3d Air Division, 15 January–28 May 1951, 7th Air Division after 5 April 1952)

- 55th Strategic Reconnaissance Wing, 16 June 1952 – 1 April 1970 (remained attached to 7th Air Division to 9 August 1952)
- 55th Strategic Reconnaissance Wing, 1 April 1979
- 55th Operations Group, 1 September 1991 – present

=== Stations ===
- Hamilton Field, California, 15 January 1941
- Columbia Airport, Oregon, 21 May 1941
- McChord Field, Washington, 14 December 1941
- Paine Field, Washington, 9 September 1942 – 20 August 1943
- RAF Nuthampstead (Station 131), England, 16 September 1943
- RAF Wormingford (Station 159), England, 16 April 1944
- Kaufbeuren Airfield (R-70), Germany, 20 July 1945
- AAF Station Giebelstadt (Y-90), Germany, 4 April–20 August 1946
- Clark Field (later Clark Air Force Base), Luzon, Philippines, 15 March 1947 – 6 May 1949
- Fairfield-Suisun Air Force Base, California, 26 May 1949
- Topeka Air Force Base (later Forbes Air Force Base), Kansas, 1 June–14 October 1949
- Barksdale Air Force Base, Louisiana, 1 November 1950
- Ramey Air Force Base, Puerto Rico, 6 January 1951

Deployed to RAF Bassingbourn, England, 15 January–28 May 1951, RAF Sculthorpe, England (5 April–15 May 1952, RAF Upper Heyford, England, 15 May–9 August 1952)

- Forbes Air Force Base, Kansas, 9 October 1952

Deployed to Ben Guerir Air Base, French Morocco, 30 May–6 August 1955

- Offutt Air Force Base, Nebraska, 16 August 1966 – 1 April 1970
- Offutt Air Force Base, Nebraska, 1 April 1979 – present

=== Aircraft ===
- Republic P-43 Lancer (1941)
- Lockheed P-38 Lightning (1941–1944)
- Republic P-47 Thunderbolt (1943)
- North American P-51 Mustang (1944–1946)
- Lockheed P-80 Shooting Star (1946)
- Douglas A-26 Invader (1946)
- Boeing B-17 Flying Fortress (1947)
- Boeing FB-17 (later RB-17) Flying Fortress (1947–1949)
- Beechcraft RC-45 Expeditor (1948–1949)
- Curtiss C-46 Commando (1948–1949)
- Douglas C-47 Skytrain (1948–1949)
- Boeing RB-29 Superfortress (1949)
- Boeing RB-50 Superfortress (1950–1954)
- Boeing RB-47 Stratojet (1954–1965)
- Boeing EB-47 Stratojet (1957–1965)
- Boeing EC-135 (1966–1970)
- Boeing KC-135 Stratotanker (1966 – c. 1968)
- Boeing RC-135 (1979–present)
