= 625th Strategic Operations Squadron =

US Air Force unit

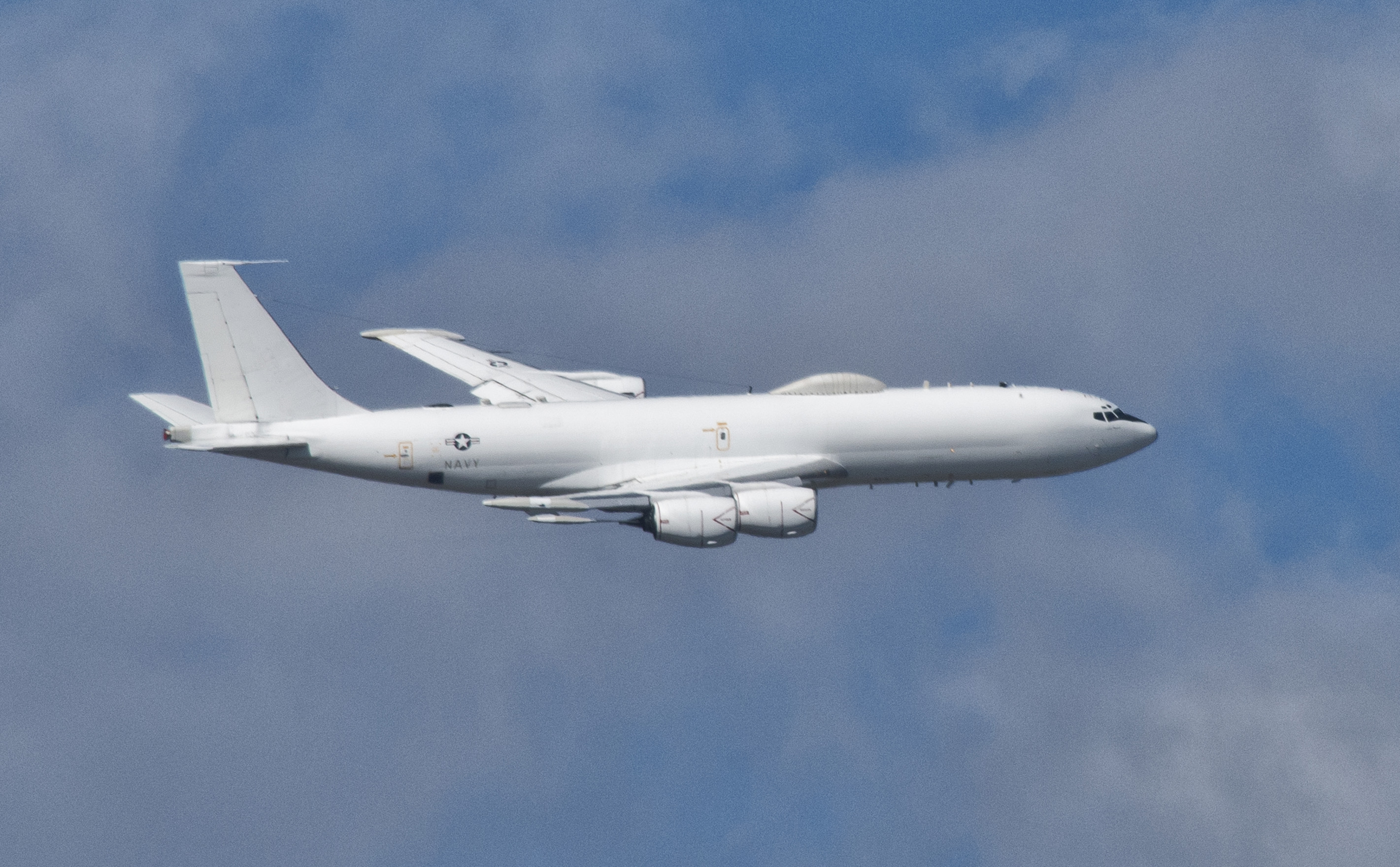
- E-6 Mercury TACAMO aircraft
- Active: 1996-present
- Country: United States
- Branch: United States Air Force
- Role: Nuclear Targeting, Airborne Launch Control System, Ballistic Missile Analysis
- Part of: Air Force Global Strike Command
- Garrison/HQ: Offutt Air Force Base, Nebraska
- Mottos: Si vis pacem, para bellum (Latin for 'If you Wish Peace, Prepare for War')
- Mascot: Harvey the RV
- Decorations: Air Force Outstanding Unit Award

Commanders
- Current commander: Lt Col Brian B. Lane

Insignia
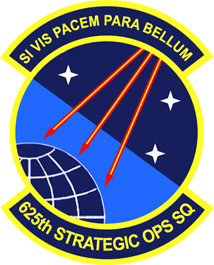
- 625th Strategic Operations Squadron emblem (Note: Approved 28 December 2017. Significance: The blue background represents sky, constancy, devotion, loyalty, and thought that contribute to the defense of the nation. The dark sky-blue field represents the atmospheric operating medium while the ultramarine/reflex-blue field represents the space operating medium. The red represent boldness, hardiness, liberty, patriotism, strength, and valor in unit character. The white represents the maturity and perfection demanded to accomplish every mission. Lastly, the gold represents the squadron's combined heritage from both 8th and 20th Air Forces, Air Force Global Strike Command and United States Strategic Command. The three red and gold lines with red arrow heads symbolize the squadron's commitment to the ever vigilant forces at three missile wings: The three white stars represent the squadron's three primary contributions to nuclear deterrence: Survivability, provided by an airborne platform, the force multiplying capability proven through rigorous tests and evaluations, and the pristine re-targeting verified and provided to on-alert ICBMs.)

The 625th Strategic Operations Squadron is a United States Air Force nuclear missile control & support squadron. It has been located at Offutt Air Force Base, Nebraska since activation in 1996 and is assigned to the 95th Wing of Air Force Global Strike Command.

== Mission and operations ==
=== Airborne Launch Control System operations flight ===
The Airborne Launch Control System operations flight provides combat forces for the United States Strategic Command Operation Looking Glass Airborne Command Post on board the Navy's Boeing E-6B Mercury aircraft. Flying as members of the battle staff, squadron personnel, using on-board equipment, provide a survivable means to launch the Nation's LGM-30 Minuteman intercontinental ballistic missile force.

=== Intercontinental ballistic missile targeting flight ===
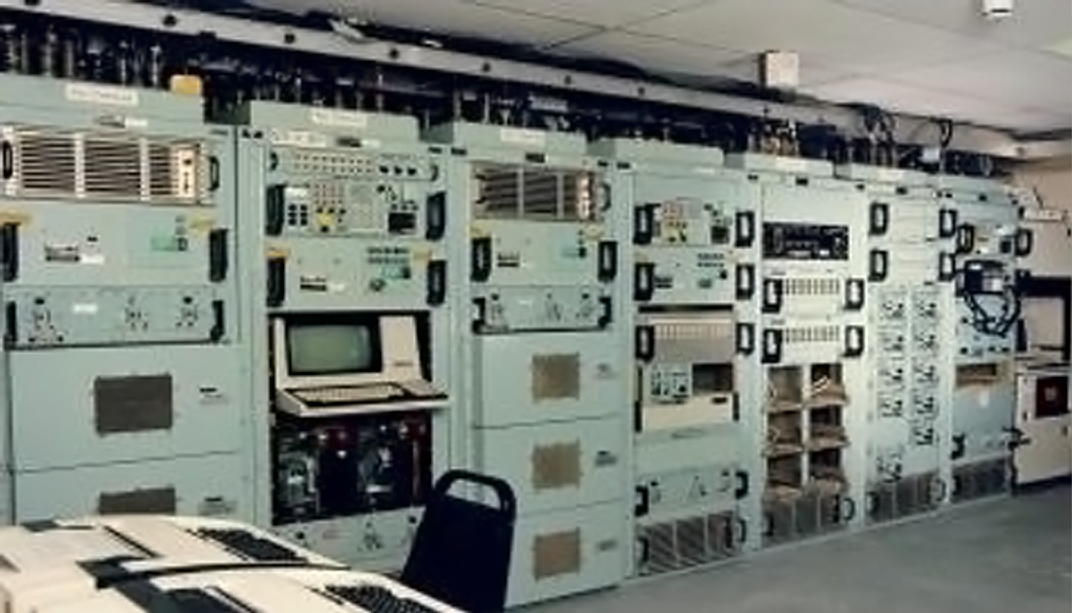
Strategic Automated Command & Control System

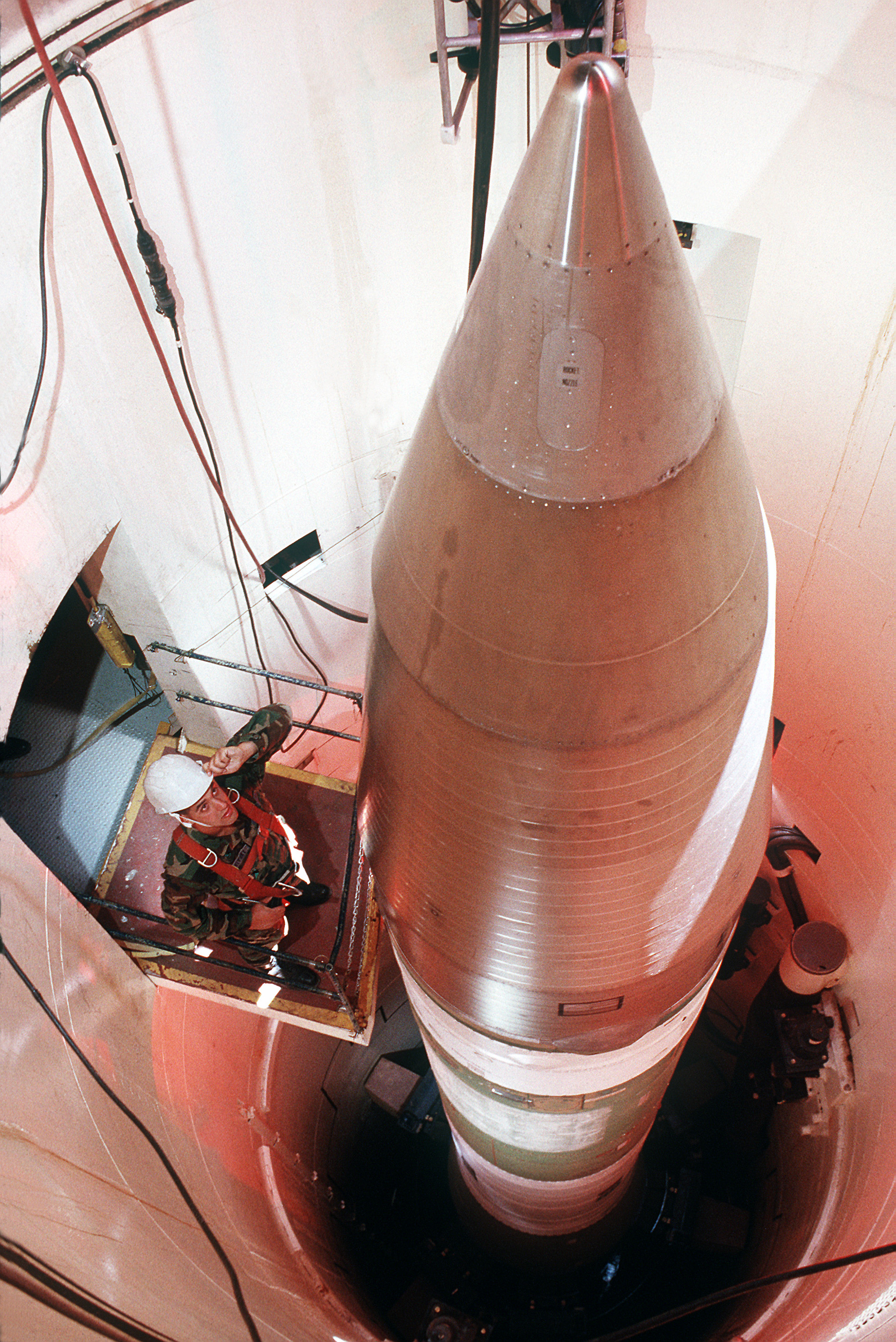
LGM-30G Minuteman III in its silo

The intercontinental ballistic missile (ICBM) targeting flight, working with United States Strategic Command maintains targeting for the nation's Minuteman fleet. Additionally, the flight produces the targeting for all ICBM test launches, support Air Force Global Strike Command software tests, and develops, documents, verifies and maintains targeting software programs and operating procedures required for daily ICBM alert operations.

=== Airborne Launch Control System training and evaluation flight ===
The Airborne Launch Control System training and evaluation flight provides simulator and classroom training to missile combat crew-airborne missileers who operate the Airborne Launch Control System on board the E-6B Mercury. The flight also provides initial mission qualification training and combat mission ready currency training and evaluation.

=== Test and analysis flight ===
The test and analysis flight executes flight safety zones and optimum launch tracks for the Airborne Launch Control System on board E-6B Mercury aircraft. The team oversees flight performance analysis and capability assessments of U.S. and foreign ballistic missile weapon systems. It also serves as the airborne test conductor for all ICBM force development evaluation missions in which they lead, plan and coordinate Airborne Launch Control System test missions with Strategic Command, Air Force Global Strike Command, the US Navy and other national agencies.

=== Intercontinental ballistic missile targeting systems flight ===
The ICBM targeting systems flight develops documents, verifies and maintains the operational readiness for ICBM targeting software programs and operating procedures required for daily Minuteman III targeting operations. Additionally, they support the targeting flight and the test and analysis flight through software development, programs, operations and network sustainment.

== History ==
The squadron was first activated at Offutt Air Force Base, Nebraska, on 15 April 1996, as the 625th Missile Operations Flight and was the product of a number of organizational changes within the ICBM community subsequent to the end of the Cold War. It initially was part of Air Force Space Command. The flight's mission was to deploy ICBM targeting, train ALCS crews and ensure operational capability of strategic communications networks between operational field units and national leadership. The unit also analyzed foreign ballistic missiles and provided threat information to the Ballistic Missile Early Warning System.

It was redesignated the 625th Strategic Operations Squadron on 14 June 2007 and reassigned from Air Force Space Command to Air Force Global Strike Command on 1 December 2009, and assigned to the 595th Command and Control Group on 1 October 2016, the unit continues to provide the same critical capability for our national defense. The 625th reports to Eighth Air Force for organization, trainining and equipment functions, while reporting to Task Force 214 and USSTRATCOM for all warfighter-related matters.

On 1 June 2017, the functions and personnel of the Strategic Automated Command and Control System flight was transferred to the 595th Strategic Communications Squadron.

== Lineage ==
- Constituted as the 625th Missile Operations Flight on 1 April 1996

Activated on 15 April 1996

- Redesignated 625th Strategic Operations Squadron on 14 June 2007

=== Assignments ===
- Twentieth Air Force, 15 April 1996
- 595th Command and Control Group, 1 October 2016
- 95th Wing, 28 February 2025

=== Stations ===
- Offutt Air Force Base, Nebraska, 15 April 1996 – present

== Missiles, aircraft, and systems supported ==
- Boeing E-6B Mercury
- Airborne Launch Control System
- LGM-30G Minuteman III

== Decorations ==
| Award streamer | Award | Dates | Notes |
|---|---|---|---|
| | Air Force Outstanding Unit Award | [15 April 1996]-30 September 1997 | 625th Missile Operations Flight (Note: Source gives starting date as 1 October 1995, but squadron was not active until April 1996.) |
| | Air Force Outstanding Unit Award | 1 October 1997-30 September 1999 | 625th Missile Operations Flight |
| | Air Force Outstanding Unit Award | 1 October 1999-30 September 2001 | 625th Missile Operations Flight |
| | Air Force Outstanding Unit Award | 1 October 2001-30 September 2003 | 625th Missile Operations Flight |
| | Air Force Outstanding Unit Award | 1 October 2005-30 September 2007 | 625th Missile Operations Flight (later 625th Strategic Operations Squadron) |
| | Air Force Outstanding Unit Award | 1 June 2008-31 May 2010 | 625th Strategic Operations Squadron |
| | Air Force Outstanding Unit Award | 1 January 2014-31 December 2014 | 625th Strategic Operations Squadron |
| | Air Force Outstanding Unit Award | 1 January 2020-31 December 2022 | 625th Strategic Operations Squadron |

== See also ==
- Operation Looking Glass
