= Vandenberg Launch Facility 8 =

Former launch facility at Vandenberg Space Force Base

Coordinates: 34.8505°N 120.5985°W

Launch Facility 08
- Interactive map of Launch Facility 08
- Short name: LF-08
- Operator: US Air Force
- Launch pad: 1
Launch history
- Status: Inactive
- Associated rockets: Minuteman

Vandenberg Space Force Base Launch Facility 08 (LC-08) is a former US Air Force Intercontinental ballistic missile launch facility on Vandenberg SFB, California, USA. It was a launch site for the land-based Minuteman missile series.

LF-08 is located to the north of the site, near Point Sal Road. In 2003 it was in use as an operational training site for the Minuteman programme. It was not considered for conversion to a Ground-Based Midcourse Defense interceptor launch site due to its training role and unsuitable conditions below the level of the silo currently in service.
