= Vandenberg Launch Facility 7 =

Coordinates: 34.8859°N 120.6338°W

Launch Facility 07
- Short name: LF-07
- Operator: US Air Force
- Launch pad: 1
Launch history
- Status: Inactive
- Associated rockets: Minuteman

Vandenberg Space Force Base Launch Facility 07 (LC-07) is a former US Air Force Intercontinental ballistic missile launch facility on Vandenberg SFB, California, USA. It was a launch site for the land-based Minuteman missile series.
