= Vandenberg Launch Facility 4 =

Coordinates: 34.8589°N 120.6066°W

Launch Facility 04
- Short name: LF-04
- Operator: United States Air Force (USAF)
- Launch pad: 1
Launch history
- Status: Active
- Associated rockets: LGM-30 Minuteman

Vandenberg Space Force Base Launch Facility 04 (LC-04) is a former United States Air Force (USAF) Intercontinental ballistic missile (ICBM) launch facility on Vandenberg Space Force Base, California, USA.

It is a launch site for the land-based LGM-30 Minuteman missile series.
