= Vandenberg Launch Facility 21 =

Missile silo at Vandenberg Space Force Base, California, US

Launch Facility 21
- Location: 34.860944°N 120.595624°W
- Short name: LF-21
- Operator: United States Army
- Launch pad: 1
Launch history
- Status: Active
- Associated rockets: Minuteman, Ground-Based Interceptor

Vandenberg Space Force Base Launch Facility 21 (LF-21) is a former US Air Force Intercontinental ballistic missile launch facility on Vandenberg SFB, California, USA. It was a launch site for the land-based Minuteman missile series. In the 2000s the silo was remodeled into a launch site for an Interceptor for the Ground-Based Midcourse Defense System.

== See also ==
Vandenberg AFB Launch Facility 02

Vandenberg AFB Launch Facility 03
