= Vandenberg Launch Facility 5 =

Former launch facility at Vandenberg Space Force Base

Coordinates: 34.8624°N 120.6095°W

Launch Facility 05
- Interactive map of Launch Facility 05
- Short name: LF-05
- Operator: US Air Force
- Launch pad: 1
Launch history
- Status: Inactive
- Associated rockets: Minuteman

Vandenberg Space Force Base Launch Facility 05 (LC-05) is a former US Air Force Intercontinental ballistic missile launch facility on Vandenberg SFB, California, USA. It was a launch site for the land-based Minuteman missile series.

The facility is located to the north of the site, off Cinco road. It was an active launch site for the Minuteman in 2003. It was considered for conversion to a Ground-Based Midcourse Defense interceptor launch site but was discounted because of its distance from related facilities would have required more work to provide the necessary electricity supply, communications lines and security.
