= AN/DRC-8 Emergency Rocket Communications System =

US Strategic Forces communications system for ballistic missiles (1963–1991)

Emergency Rocket Communications System
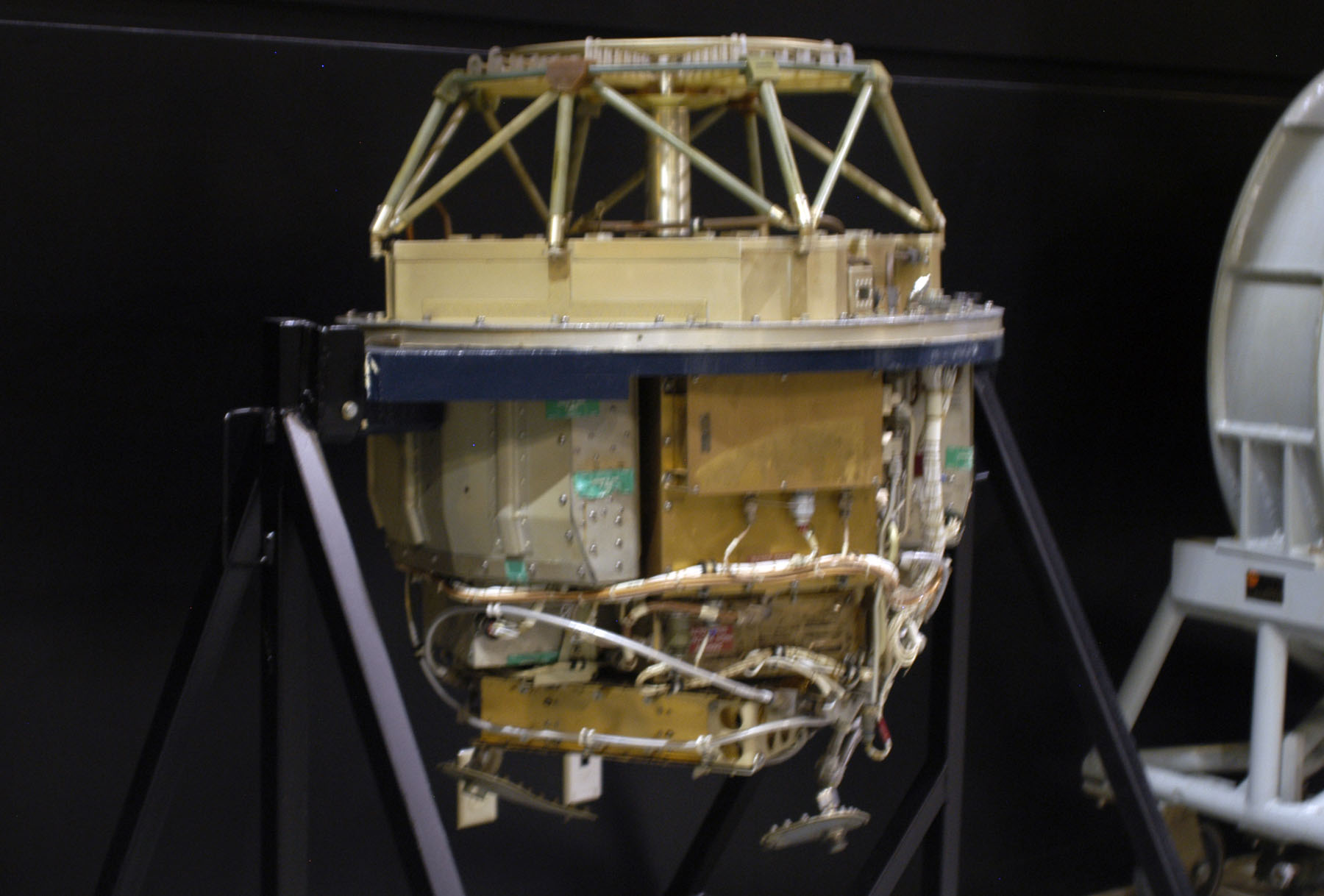
- Emergency Rocket Communications System payload
- Type: Intercontinental ballistic missile/Communications System
- Place of origin: United States

Service history
- In service: 1963–1968 (Blue Scout); 1968–1991 (Minuteman II)
- Used by: United States: 510th Missile Squadron

Production history
- Manufacturer: Boeing
- Unit cost: US$7,000,000 (equivalent to $64,808,612 in 2025)

Specifications
- Mass: 78,000 pounds (35,000 kg)
- Length: 59 feet 9.5 inches (18.225 m)
- Diameter: 5 feet 6 inches (1.68 m) (1st stage)
- Warhead: 1 kW UHF Transmitter
- Engine: Three solid-propellant rocket motors; First stage – Thiokol TU-122 (M-55); Second stage – Aerojet-General SR-19-AJ-1; Third stage – Aerojet/Thiokol SR73-AJ/TC-1
- Operational range: 8,100 miles (13,000 km)
- Flight altitude: 700 miles (1,100 km)
- Maximum speed: Approximately 15,000 miles per hour (Mach 20; 24,000 km/h; 6.7 km/s) (terminal phase)
- Guidance system: Inertial
- Launch platform: Silo

The Emergency Rocket Communications System (ERCS) was designed to provide a reliable and survivable emergency communications method for the United States National Command Authority, using a UHF repeater placed atop a Blue Scout rocket or Minuteman II intercontinental ballistic missile. ERCS was deactivated as a communication means when President George H.W. Bush issued a message to stand down SIOP-committed bombers and Minuteman IIs on 27 September 1991. Headquarters SAC was given approval by the Joint Chiefs of Staff to deactivate the 494L payloads beginning 1 October 1992. However, Headquarters SAC believed it was inefficient and unnecessary to support ERCS past fiscal year 1991, and kept the accelerated deactivation schedule.

== Mission ==
The mission of the Emergency Rocket Communications System was to provide assured communication to United States strategic forces in the event of a nuclear attack. ERCS was a rocket or missile that carried a UHF transmitter as a payload instead of a nuclear warhead. In the event of a nuclear attack, ERCS would launch the UHF transmitter into low space to transmit an Emergency Action Message (EAM) to Strategic Air Command units.

The ERCS sorties had two possible trajectories, East and West, to inform SAC alert forces in the northern tier bases (i.e. Minot AFB, Fairchild AFB, Grand Forks AFB).

ERCS was deactivated and taken out of the inventory as other means of emergency communication (i.e. the Intercontinental Ballistic Missile [ICBM] Super High Frequency Satellite Terminal [ISST] and Milstar) came online.

== Nomenclature ==
ERCS was also known as Project 279 (Blue Scout version) and Project 494L (Minuteman version). Sources report that the Project 279 was also known as Project Beanstalk; while the Minuteman system may have been designated LEM-70A.

Using the Department of Defense's Joint Electronics Type Designation System (JETDS), the system was designated as AN/DRC-8. Within JETDS, that designation represents the 8th design of an Army-Navy pilotless carrier two-way communications radio.

== Operations ==
The Blue Scout version of ERCS (Program 279) was deployed to three sites near Wisner, West Point, and Tekamah, Nebraska. The Program 494L Minuteman version of ERCS was only deployed to Whiteman AFB, Missouri's 351st Strategic Missile Wing, under the direct control of the 510th Strategic Missile Squadron (later the 510th Missile Squadron).

ERCS was a three part communications system composed of the following elements:

1. The five 510th Strategic Missile Squadron Launch Control Centers, which exercised primary control over the ERCS
2. The Minuteman missiles configured with ERCS payloads that were capable of accepting a voice recorded message of up to 90 seconds in length
3. The SAC airborne command post (ABNCP) ALCC-equipped aircraft which served as an alternate ERCS control agency.

Interface with ERCS hardware was provided by three modes:

- A land line through ground grouping points (North Bend, Nebraska and Red Oak, Iowa) allowed the airborne command post interface with 494L equipment
- A UHF radio link through the Launch Control Center to the Launch Facility
- A direct radio interface to the Launch Facility, through the Airborne Launch Control System

Headquarters Strategic Air Command had the ability to make inputs directly into the missile. The Numbered Air Forces could direct the missile crew to make the inputs. In the case of the airborne command post, inputs could be made directly into the missile and missile launch could be made from the aircraft.

== Testing ==
Operational tests of the 494L Minuteman II ERCS were conducted by Air Force Systems Command and Strategic Air Command under the code name GIANT MOON. Launch Control Facility Oscar-1A (LCF O-1A) and Launch Facility Zero Four (LF-04) at Vandenberg AFB, California were modified in 1977 to perform ERCS-related test functions.

Blue Scout Jr ERCS Test Launches
Date	Launch Vehicle	Location	Apogee	Notes
31 May 1962	Blue Scout Jr SLV-1C	Vandenberg AFB, LC-A	1,000 kilometres (620 mi)
24 July 1962	Blue Scout Jr SLV-1C	Vandenberg AFB, LC-A	1,000 kilometres (620 mi)
21 November 1962	Blue Scout Jr SLV-1C	Vandenberg AFB, LC-A	1,000 kilometres (620 mi)
2 February 1963	Blue Scout Jr SLV-1C	Vandenberg AFB, LC-A	1,000 kilometres (620 mi)
14 March 1963	Blue Scout Jr SLV-1C	Vandenberg AFB, LC-A	1,000 kilometres (620 mi)
17 May 1963	Blue Scout Jr SLV-1C	Vandenberg AFB, LC-A	1,000 kilometres (620 mi)
17 December 1963	Blue Scout Jr SLV-1C	Vandenberg AFB, 4300C	1,000 kilometres (620 mi)
Minuteman II ERCS Test Launches
Date	Launch Vehicle	Location	Apogee	Notes
13 December 1966	Minuteman II	Vandenberg AFB, LF-05	1,300 kilometres (810 mi)	First Minuteman ERCS test
2 February 1967	Minuteman II	Vandenberg AFB, LF-05	1,300 kilometres (810 mi)	Second Minuteman ERCS test
4 August 1963	Minuteman II	Vandenberg AFB, LF-05	1,300 kilometres (810 mi)	GIANT MOON 1, GLORY TRIP 16L
22 October 1971	Minuteman II	Vandenberg AFB, LF-05	1,300 kilometres (810 mi)	GIANT MOON 2, GLORY TRIP 40L
22 March 1972	Minuteman II	Vandenberg AFB, LF-05	1,300 kilometres (810 mi)	GIANT MOON 3, GLORY TRIP 200L
26 July 1973	Minuteman II	Vandenberg AFB, LF-05	1,300 kilometres (810 mi)	GIANT MOON 4
12 March 1974	Minuteman II	Vandenberg AFB, LF-05	1,300 kilometres (810 mi)	GIANT MOON 5
22 October 1974	Minuteman II	Vandenberg AFB, LF-05	1,300 kilometres (810 mi)	GIANT MOON 6
5 September 1975	Minuteman II	Vandenberg AFB, LF-05	1,300 kilometres (810 mi)	GIANT MOON 7
26 October 1976	Minuteman II	Vandenberg AFB, LF-05	1,300 kilometres (810 mi)	GIANT MOON 8

== ERCS sortie location ==
After the system was declassified, the ten ERCS sorties were powered down and removed from their launch facilities. During these power-down operations, the location of the sorties were:

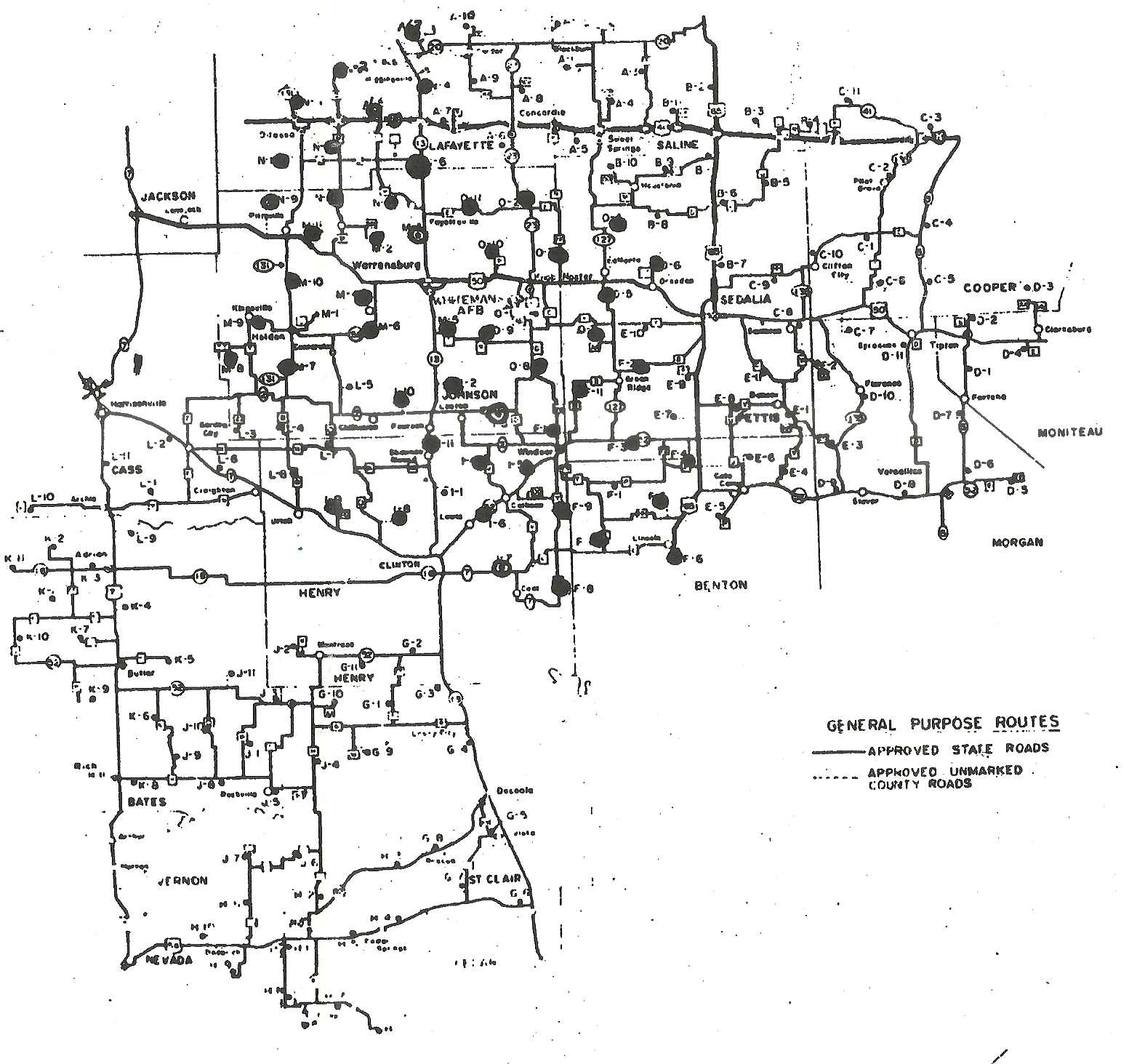

Launch Facility	Power Down Date	Payload Removal Date	Notes
F06	2 October 1991	15 October 1991	
F07	2 October 1991	17 October 1991	
I06	2 October 1991	22 October 1991	
I11	2 October 1991	28 October 1991	
M03	28 September 1991	3 October 1991	Missile Guidance System failed; was not replaced
M07	2 October 1991	8 October 1991	
N04	2 October 1991	29 October 1991	
N08	2 October 1991	31 October 1991	
O05	2 October 1991	29 October 1991	
O06	2 October 1991	31 October 1991	

== Material and support ==
The Ogden Air Materiel Area at Hill AFB, Utah was made the Systems Support Manager in August 1963.

== Chronology ==
- 29 September 1961 – HQ USAF issues Specific Operational Requirement (SOR) 192, for ERCS (designated Program 279)
- 27 December 1961 – Interim configuration finalized of three rockets with 1 KW transmitters, stationed around Omaha, Nebraska; four sites with three rockets each
- 5 April 1962 – Amendment to SOR 192 to include two east coast ERCS complexes, based on CHROME DOME routes and SAC elements in Europe
- 21 September 1962 – SAC study recommends use of Minuteman missile, to eliminate Program 279 and its proposed expansion
- 7 June 1962 – SAC proposes changes to SOR 192, such as using six Minuteman missiles selected from among the flights of an operational wing; this was envisioned not to impair the alternative capability of substituting nuclear warheads should future circumstances warrant.
- 11 July 1962 – Program 279 attains Initial Operating Capability (IOC); UHF transmitter payloads attached to three MER-6A Blue Scout rockets at three sites near Wisner, West Point, and Tekamah, Nebraska
- 13 December 1966 – A Minuteman II launched from Vandenberg AFB, Calif. carried the first Minuteman ERCS payload into space for testing and evaluation
- 17 April 1967 – Third, and last, test of the ERCS using a Minuteman booster; Emergency Action Message was inserted into the transmitter from an ALCS aircraft.
- 15 August 1967 – First Program 494L payload arrives at Whiteman AFB, Missouri
- 10 October 1967 – First two Program 494L ERCS payloads put on alert at Whiteman AFB, Missouri; IOC obtained for Program 494L ERCS
- 1 January 1968 – Full Operational Capability (FOC) obtained for Program 494L ERCS; Program 279 ERCS inactivated by SAC
- 23 October 1974 – ERCS test, designated GIANT MOON 6, launched from Vandenberg AFB. Test was monitored on two frequencies by ground facilities. PACOM at Hickam AFB maintained valid reception of the JCS WHITE DOT ONE message for 22 minutes and another message for 14 minutes
- 27 September 1991 – President George H. W. Bush terminated SAC's alert force operations, which included taking Minuteman II ICBMs (including ERCS sorties) off-alert.

== In popular culture ==
ERCS is mentioned in The Dead Hand: The Untold Story of the Cold War Arms Race and its Dangerous Legacy by David Hoffman.

ERCS is mentioned in Arc Light by Eric Harry.

== See also ==
- List of military electronics of the United States
- Dead Hand – Russia's version of ERCS, relaying launch codes instead of messages
- Post-Attack Command and Control System (PACCS)
- Airborne Launch Control System (ALCS)
- Ground Wave Emergency Network (GWEN)
- Minimum Essential Emergency Communications Network (MEECN)
- Survivable Low Frequency Communications System (SLFCS)
- Primary Alerting System (PAS)
- SAC Automated Command and Control System (SACCS)
