= 1st Airborne Command Control Squadron =

US Air Force unit

1st Airborne Command Control Squadron

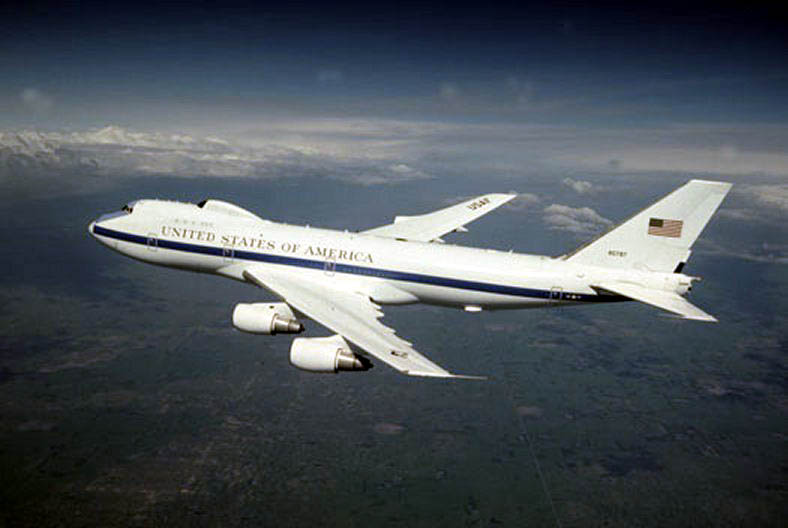
- 1st Airborne Command Control Squadron Boeing E-4 in flight
- Active: 1917–1922; 1929–1942; 1942–1944; 1969–present
- Country: United States
- Branch: United States Air Force
- Role: Airborne Command and Control
- Part of: Air Force Global Strike Command: Eighth Air Force; 95th Air Base Wing
- Garrison/HQ: Offutt Air Force Base, Nebraska
- Engagements: World War I – Western Front World War II – American Theater Global war on terrorism

- Decorations: Air Force Meritorious Unit Award Air Force Outstanding Unit Award

Insignia
- 1st Airborne Command Control Squadron emblem (Note: Approved 8 August 1969.)

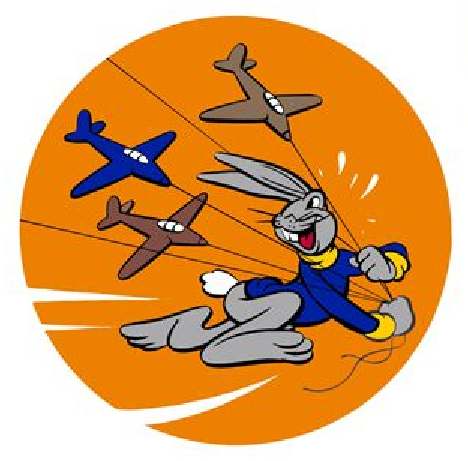
- 1st Ferrying Squadron emblem

The 1st Airborne Command Control Squadron is part of the 95th Wing at Offutt Air Force Base, Nebraska. It operates the Boeing E-4 aircraft conducting airborne command and control missions.

The squadron is one of the oldest in the United States Air Force, its origins dating to 25 September 1917, when it was organized at Fort Omaha, Nebraska. It served overseas in France as part of the American Expeditionary Forces during World War I. The squadron saw combat during World War II, and became part of the Strategic Air Command during the Cold War.

== History ==
=== World War and Balloon School ===
The first predecessor of the squadron was organized at Fort Omaha Nebraska in September 1917 as Company A, 2d Balloon Squadron. Two months later it departed for overseas service on the Western Front (World War I), arriving in France in January 1918. It entered combat as an observation unit with the French Eighth Army on 19 April 1918, operating observation balloons over the front lines. Once forces of the American Expeditionary Forces, had built up, it continued to operate as the 1st Balloon Company with the American I Corps until 17 October 1918. Following the end of the war, it served with III Corps as part of the occupation forces until April 1919.

=== Interwar years ===
In the spring of 1919, the squadron returned to the United States and was stationed at Ross Field, California as part of the Air Service Balloon School. In June 1922, the Balloon School moved to Scott Field, Illinois and Ross Field was closed as a military installation. The squadron was inactivated with the closure of Ross.

The second predecessor of the squadron, also designated the 1st Balloon Company, was activated at Scott in May 1929. After a brief period of training with the 21st Airship Group at Scott, it moved to Post Field, located on Fort Sill, Oklahoma, where it was assigned to the Field Artillery School. It trained and conducted exercises with the school. At the beginning of World War II, it operated barrage balloons, but that mission was assigned to the coast artillery and the squadron was disbanded two months after the Japanese attack on Pearl Harbor.

=== World War II ===
The third predecessor of the squadron was activated in April 1942 at Long Beach Army Air Base as the 1st Air Corps Ferrying Squadron, the location of a Douglas Aircraft Company manufacturing plant. It ferried aircraft from the Douglas factory and other factories in the Western Procurement District to overseas departure points. However, the Army Air Forces was finding that standard military units, based on relatively inflexible tables of organization were not well adapted to the training and logistics support mission. Accordingly, it adopted a more functional system in which each base was organized into a separate numbered unit. In March 1944, Air Transport Command units assigned to the 6th Ferrying Group were combined into the 556th AAF Base Unit.

=== Airborne command and control ===
On 1 June 1962, Headquarters Command organized the 1000th Airborne Command Control Squadron at Andrews Air Force Base to operate the National Emergency Airborne Command Post (abbreviated NEACP and spoken "kneecap"). and assigned it to the 1001st Air Base Wing. It flew its first missions with EC-135J aircraft, code named Silver Dollar. On 1 July 1969, the 1st Airborne Command Control Squadron was activated and assumed the mission, personnel and equipment of the 1000th Squadron. (Note: Although the 1st Squadron was a new organization, it was also entitled to retain the honors (but not the history or lineage) of the 1000th. This includes an Air Force Outstanding Unit Award earned for the period 1 January 1967 – 31 December 1968. AF Pamphlet 900-2, p. 484.)

In 1974, the squadron began to replace its EC-135s with more capable Boeing E-4As, codenamed "Nightwatch", achieving initial operating capability on 22 December, and completing the upgrade the following year. In November 1975, the squadron was reassigned from Andrews' 1st Composite Wing to the 55th Strategic Reconnaissance Wing at Offutt Air Force Base, Nebraska. On 1 July 1977, it moved to join the 55th Wing at Offutt, (Note: Offutt Air Force Base occupies much of the same ground as Fort Omaha did in 1917, when the 2d Balloon Squadron was organized there.) although starting in December, it maintained a forward operating location at Andrews. By 1985, it had upgraded all its aircraft to E-4Bs. In 1980, it tested combining the Nightwatch mission with Strategic Air Command's Airborne Command Post, code named Looking Glass. On 1 October 2016, the unit was reassigned to the newly activated 595th Command and Control Group under the control of Air Force Global Strike Command. On 28 February 2025, the 595th CCG was inactivated and the squadron was reassigned to the newly-reactivated 95th Wing.

== Lineage and assignments ==
=== Consolidation ===
The 1st Airborne Command Control Squadron represents the consolidation of ultimately four different units, done in two consolidations. The first involved consolidating the 1st Airship and 1st Balloon Companies in 1929 into what would become the 1st Balloon Squadron. This was then consolidated with the 1st Ferrying Squadron and 1st Airborne Command Control Squadron in 1985 to form the current unit.

Current unit	Units consolidated on 19 September 1985	Units consolidated on 31 July 1929
1st Airborne Command Control Squadron	1st Balloon Squadron	1st Airship Company
1st Airborne Command Control Squadron	1st Balloon Squadron	1st Balloon Company
1st Airborne Command Control Squadron	1st Ferrying Squadron	
1st Airborne Command Control Squadron	1st Airborne Command Control Squadron	

=== 1st Airship Company ===
Date	Designation	Assignment	Station	Equipment	Notes
25 September 1917	Company A, 2d Balloon Squadron		Fort Omaha, Nebraska		organized
30 November 1917	Company A, 2d Balloon Squadron		Garden City, New York		
7 December 1917	Company A, 2d Balloon Squadron		transit		
3 January 1918	Company A, 2d Balloon Squadron		Gironde, France	Caquot Type R observation balloon	
15 April 1918	Company A, 2d Balloon Squadron		Brouville, France	Caquot Type R observation balloon	
19 June 1918	1st Balloon Company		Brouville, France	Caquot Type R observation balloon	
July 1918	1st Balloon Company	Balloon Wing, I Army Corps	Brouville, France	Caquot Type R observation balloon	
19 July 1918	1st Balloon Company	Balloon Wing, I Army Corps	Les Ecoliers, France	Caquot Type R observation balloon	
22 July 1918	1st Balloon Company	Balloon Wing, I Army Corps	Épaux-Bézu, France	Caquot Type R observation balloon	
25 July 1918	1st Balloon Company	Balloon Wing, I Army Corps	Épieds, Aisne, France	Caquot Type R observation balloon	
28 July 1918	1st Balloon Company	Balloon Wing, I Army Corps	Artois Ferme, France	Caquot Type R observation balloon	
5 August 1918	1st Balloon Company	Balloon Wing, I Army Corps	Mareuil-en-Dole, France	Caquot Type R observation balloon	
13 August 1918	1st Balloon Company	Balloon Wing, I Army Corps	Coucelles-sur-Vesle, France	Caquot Type R observation balloon	
23 August 1918	1st Balloon Company	Balloon Wing, I Army Corps	Tremblecourt, France	Caquot Type R observation balloon	
29 August 1918	1st Balloon Company	Balloon Wing, I Army Corps	La Queue de Theinard, France	Caquot Type R observation balloon	
27 September 1918	1st Balloon Company	Balloon Wing, I Army Corps	Bois de Brule, France	Caquot Type R observation balloon	
2 October 1918	1st Balloon Company	Balloon Wing, I Army Corps	Varennes-en-Argonne, France	Caquot Type R observation balloon	
8 October 1918	1st Balloon Company	Balloon Group, I Army Corps	Varennes-en-Argonne, France	Caquot Type R observation balloon	
11 October 1918	1st Balloon Company	Balloon Group, I Army Corps	Chatel-Chehery, France	Caquot Type R observation balloon	
17 October 1918	1st Balloon Company	Balloon Group, I Army Corps	Auzeville-en-Argonne, France	Caquot Type R observation balloon	
20 November 1918	1st Balloon Company	Balloon Group, III Army Corps	Auzeville-en-Argonne, France	Caquot Type R observation balloon	
21 November 1918	1st Balloon Company	Balloon Group, III Army Corps	Mercy-le-Bas, France	Caquot Type R observation balloon	
8 December 1918	1st Balloon Company	Balloon Group, III Army Corps	Euren, Germany	Caquot Type R observation balloon	
19 December 1918	1st Balloon Company	Balloon Group, III Army Corps	Niederberg, Germany	Caquot Type R observation balloon	
17 April 1919	1st Balloon Company		Colombey-les-Belles, France	Caquot Type R observation balloon	
5 May 1919	1st Balloon Company		St. Nazaire, France	Caquot Type R observation balloon	
6 June 1919	1st Balloon Company		Camp Lee, Virginia	Caquot Type R observation balloon	
July 1919	1st Balloon Company	Air Service Balloon Observers School	Ross Field, California	Caquot Type R observation balloon	
30 June 1922	1st Balloon Company	Ninth Corps Area	Ross Field, California	Caquot Type R observation balloon	
25 July 1922	1st Balloon Company	inactive			
24 March 1923	1st Airship Company	inactive			
31 July 1929	1st Airship Company	consolidated into 1st Balloon Company			

=== 1st Balloon Squadron ===
Date	Designation	Assignment	Station	Equipment	Notes
18 October 1927	1st Balloon Company	inactive			
17 May 1929	1st Balloon Company	Sixth Corps Area	Scott Field, Illinois	A-6 & A-7 spherical balloon C-3 observation balloon	
June 1929	1st Balloon Company	Field Artillery School	Scott Field, Illinois	A-6 & A-7 spherical balloon C-3 observation balloon	
24 June 1929	1st Balloon Company	Field Artillery School	Post Field, Oklahoma	A-6 & A-7 spherical balloon C-3 observation balloon	
1 October 1933	1st Balloon Squadron	Field Artillery School	Post Field, Oklahoma	A-6 & A-7 spherical balloon C-3 observation balloon	
1937	1st Balloon Squadron	Field Artillery School	Post Field, Oklahoma	A-6 & A-7 spherical balloon C-3 & C-6 observation balloon	
1939	1st Balloon Squadron	Field Artillery School	Post Field, Oklahoma	A-6 & A-7 spherical balloon C-3 & C-6 observation balloon D-2 barrage balloon	
1940	1st Balloon Squadron	Field Artillery School	Post Field, Oklahoma	A-6 & A-7 spherical balloon C-6 observation balloon D-3, D-4, D-5, & D-6 barrage balloon	
1 September 1941	1st Balloon Squadron	III Air Support Command	Post Field, Oklahoma	A-6 & A-7 spherical balloon C-6 observation balloon D-3, D-4, D-5, & D-6 barrage balloon	
6 February 1942	1st Balloon Squadron	disbanded			
19 September 1985	1st Balloon Squadron	reconstituted and consolidated into 1st Airborne Command Control Squadron			

=== 1st Ferrying Squadron ===
Date	Designation	Assignment	Station	Equipment	Notes
18 February 1942	1st Air Corps Ferrying Squadron	inactive			
15 April 1942	1st Air Corps Ferrying Squadron	6th Ferrying Group	Long Beach, California	various aircraft	
12 May 1943	1st Ferrying Squadron	6th Ferrying Group	Long Beach, California	various aircraft	
1 April 1944	1st Ferrying Squadron	disbanded			
19 September 1985	1st Ferrying Squadron	reconstituted and consolidated into the 1st Airborne Command Control Squadron			

=== 1st Airborne Command Control Squadron ===
Date	Designation	Assignment	Station	Equipment	Notes
9 May 1969	1st Airborne Command Control Squadron	inactive			
1 July 1969	1st Airborne Command Control Squadron	1st Composite Wing	Andrews Air Force Base, Maryland	EC-135J	
December 1974	1st Airborne Command Control Squadron	1st Composite Wing	Andrews Air Force Base, Maryland	E-4A, EC-135J	
1 November 1975	1st Airborne Command Control Squadron	55th Strategic Reconnaissance Wing	Andrews Air Force Base, Maryland	E-4A, EC-135J	
1976	1st Airborne Command Control Squadron	55th Strategic Reconnaissance Wing	Andrews Air Force Base, Maryland	Boeing E-4A	
1 July 1977	1st Airborne Command Control Squadron	55th Strategic Reconnaissance Wing	Offutt Air Force Base, Nebraska	Boeing E-4A	
December 1979	1st Airborne Command Control Squadron	55th Strategic Reconnaissance Wing	Offutt Air Force Base, Nebraska	E-4A/B	
January 1985	1st Airborne Command Control Squadron	55th Strategic Reconnaissance Wing	Offutt Air Force Base, Nebraska	E-4B	
1 September 1991	55th Operations Group	55th Strategic Reconnaissance Wing	Offutt Air Force Base, Nebraska	E-4B	
1 October 2016	595th Command and Control Group	55th Strategic Reconnaissance Wing	Offutt Air Force Base, Nebraska	E-4B	
28 February 2025	1st Airborne Command Control Squadron	95th Wing	Offutt Air Force Base, Nebraska	E-4B	

== See also ==
- 2d Airborne Command and Control Squadron
