= 595th Command and Control Group =

US Air Force unit

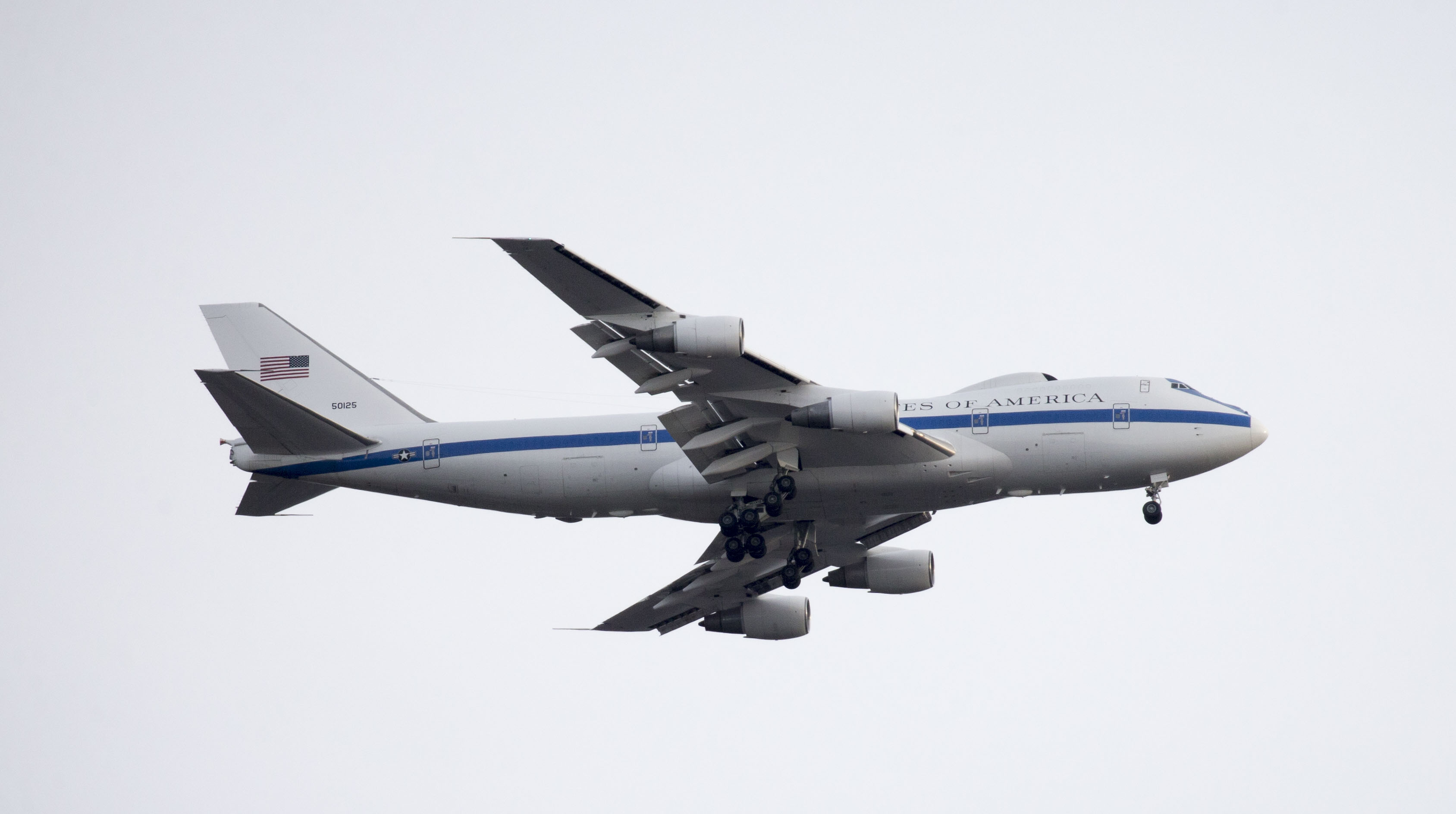
- Boeing E-4B Airborne Command Post
- Active: 1970–1993; 2000–2013; 2016–2025
- Country: United States
- Branch: United States Air Force
- Role: Command and Control
- Part of: Eighth Air Force
- Garrison/HQ: Offutt Air Force Base, Nebraska
- Decorations: Air Force Outstanding Unit Award; Air Force Organizational Excellence Award

Insignia
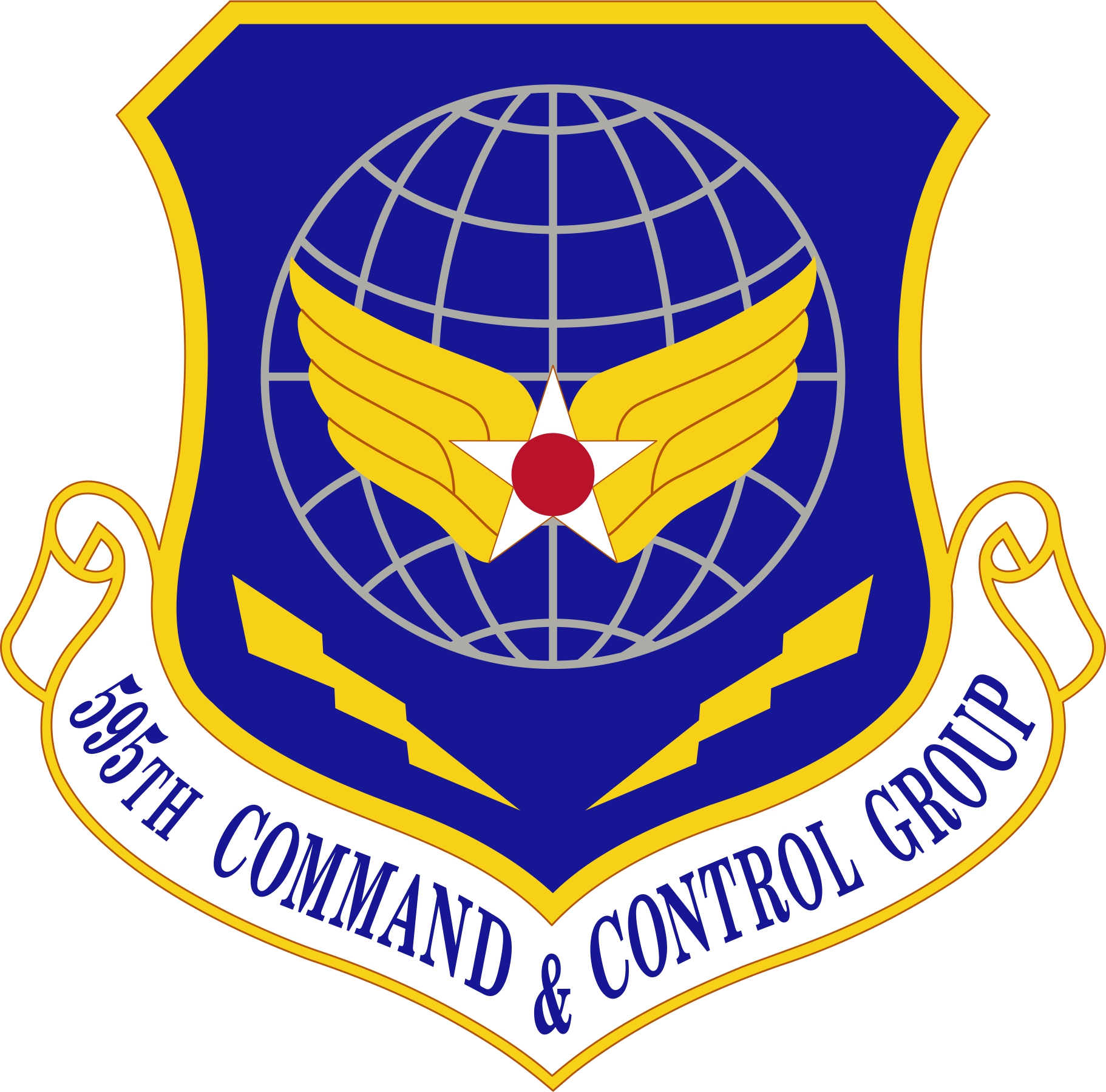
- 595th Command and Control Group emblem (Note: Approved 5 December 2016.)

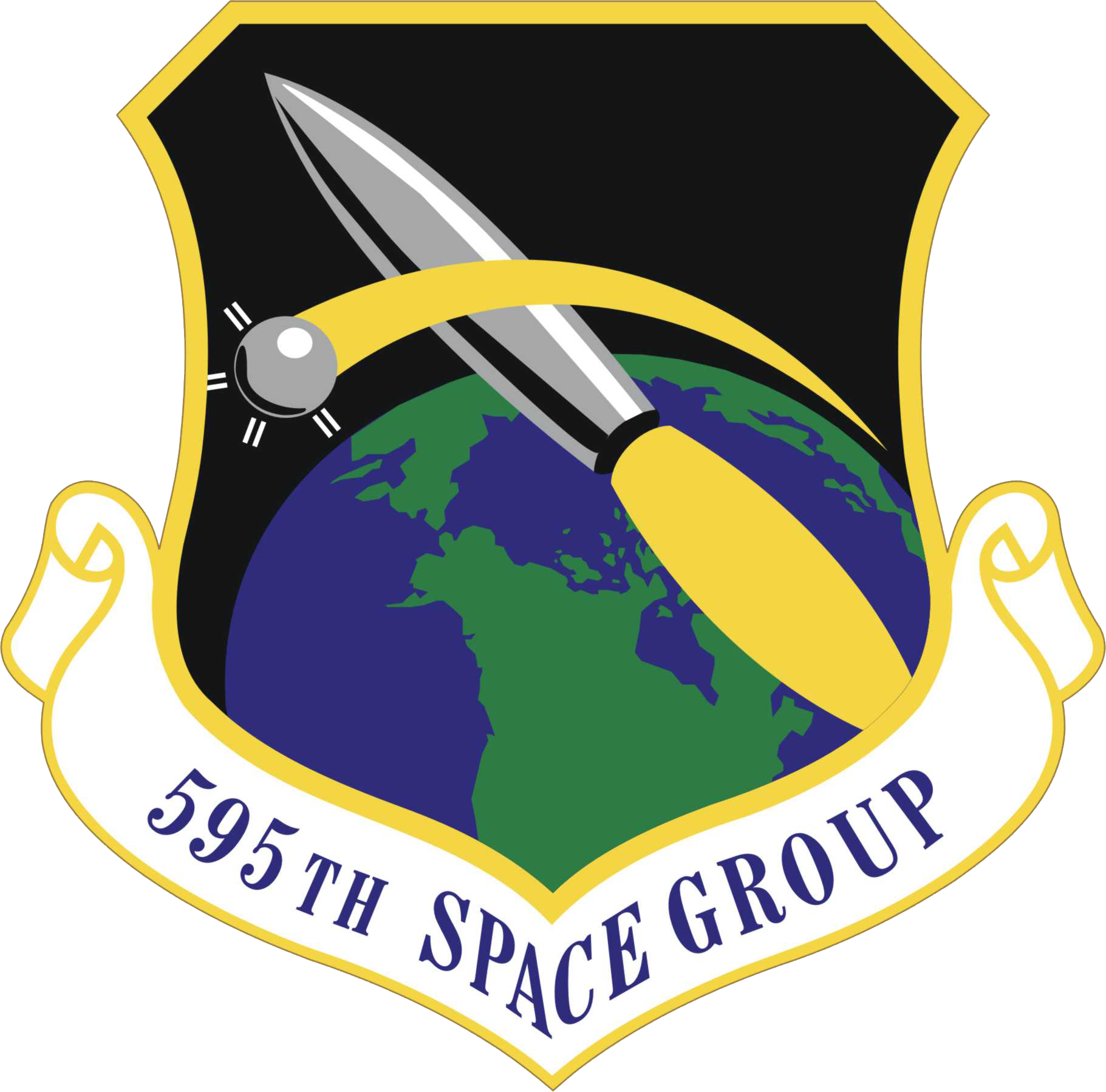
- 595th Space Group emblem (Note: Approved 7 September 2007.)

The 595th Command and Control Group (595 C2G) is an inactive unit of the United States Air Force. It was a nuclear command and control unit of Eighth Air Force, with its operations were centered at Offutt Air Force Base, Nebraska. It was activated on 6 October 2016.

From 1970 to 1993, it conducted tests of intercontinental ballistic missiles from Vandenberg Air Force Base as the 6595th Missile Test Group.

It was inactivated in February 2025 with most of its components transferred to the 95th Wing.

== History ==
=== Missile Testing ===
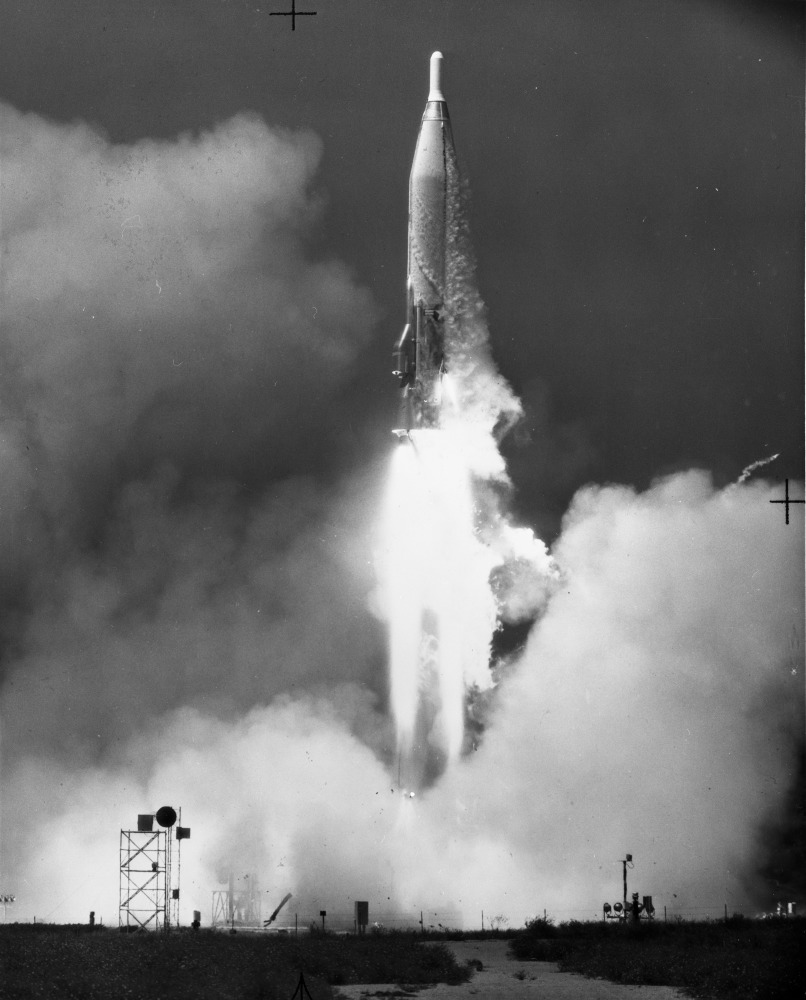
Atlas ICBM test launch at Vandenberg AFB, Calif

The unit was first organized by Air Force Systems Command at Vandenberg Air Force Base, California in May 1970 as the 6595 Missile Test Group. In early 1970s, the group conducted ground and flight tests of the LGM-30 Minuteman weapon system. It also launched and tested missile, space and aeronautical systems in support of Department of Defense programs.

After the loss of the Space Shuttle Challenger in January 1986, the space program was grounded for 34 months until the launch of Space Transportation System-26 in September 1988. After the terrorist attacks of 11 September 2001, the group examined vulnerabilities of US space facilities at home and abroad. The Air Force's Tactical Exploitation of National Capabilities Program transferred national capabilities to operational commands. The group's Air Force Space Battlelab developed and field tested capabilities to increase productivity of operational commands. Its Aerospace Fusion Center supported space missile launches. The group was inactivated in September 1993.

In April 2000, the group, redesignated the 595th Test and Evaluation Group was reactivated at Schriever Air Force Base, Colorado. It supported Operation Iraqi Freedom through the application of space applications programs during 2003 and 2004. After redesignation as the 595th Space Group in 2002, it was inactivated in 2013.

=== Nuclear command and control ===
The group was redesignated the 595th Command and Control Group at Offutt Air Force Base, Nebraska in October 2016 with four squadrons assigned to provide aircrew, operators and maintenance personnel for nuclear command, control and communications platforms enabling the National Command Authority survivable, real-time strategic assessment and global strike capabilities. Its 1st Airborne Command Control Squadron operated the Boeing E-4 National Airborne Command Post, maintained by the 595th Aircraft Maintenance Squadron. Its 625th Strategic Operations Squadron maintained targeting for the nation's intercontinental ballistic missile fleet and provided personnel to launch them from Boeing E-6B Mercury aircraft in flight. The 595th Strategic Communications Squadron provided missile warning and command, control and communications capabilities. They maintained and operated the Strategic Automated Command Control System, providing rapid retargeting of ICBMs.

The group had a shared commander with the National Airborne Operations Center. It was inactivated on 28 February 2025 and its resources transferred to the newly activated 95th Wing

== Lineage ==
- Designated as the 6595th Missile Test Group and activated on 1 May 1970

Redesignated 6595th Test and Evaluation Group on 1 January 1988
Inactivated on 14 September 1993

- Redesignated 595th Test and Evaluation Group on 1 April 2000

Activated on 7 April 2000
Redesignated 595th Space Group on 1 August 2002
Inactivated on 1 April 2013

- Redesignated 595th Command and Control Group on 26 August 2016

Activated 1 October 2016
Inactivated 28 February 2025

=== Assignments ===
- 6595th Aerospace Test Wing, 1 May 1970
- Western Space and Missile Center, 1 October 1979
- Ballistic Missile Organization, 1 October 1990
- Space and Missile Systems Center, 2 – 14 Sep 1993
- Space Warfare (later, Space Innovation and Development) Center, 7 April 2000 – 1 April 2013
- Eighth Air Force, 1 October 2016 – 28 February 2025

=== Operational Components ===
- 1st Airborne Command Control Squadron: 1 October 2016 – 28 February 2025
- 17th Test Squadron: 7 April 2000 – 1 April 2013
- 25th Space Control Tactics (later, 25th Space Range) Squadron: 1 July 2004 – 14 April 2006
- 527th Space Aggressor Squadron: 23 October 2002 – 1 April 2013
- 576th Flight Test Squadron: 7 Apr 2000 – 1 December 2009
- 625th Strategic Operations Squadron: 1 October 2016 – 28 February 2025

=== Stations ===
- Vandenberg Air Force Base, California, 1 May 1970 – 14 September 1993
- Schriever Air Force Base, Colorado, 7 April 2000 – 1 April 2013
- Offutt Air Force Base, Nebraska, 6 October 2016 – 28 February 2025

=== Aircraft & Missiles ===
- LGM-30 Minuteman (1970–1993, 2000–2001)
- LGM-118 Peacekeeper (1983–1989, 2000–2005)
- SM-65 Atlas (1970–1990)
- SM-68 Titan (1970–1993)
- Boeing E-4B (2016–2025)

=== Awards ===
Award streamer	Award	Dates	Notes
	Air Force Outstanding Unit Award	1 April 1970-31 March 1971	6595th Missile Test Group
	Air Force Outstanding Unit Award	1 April 1971-31 March 1973	6595th Missile Test Group
	Air Force Outstanding Unit Award	15 January 1976-14 January 1978	6595th Missile Test Group
	Air Force Outstanding Unit Award	15 January 1978-30 September 1979	6595th Missile Test Group
	Air Force Outstanding Unit Award	1 October 1984-30 September 1986	6595th Missile Test Group
	Air Force Outstanding Unit Award	1 January 1990-30 June 1992	6595th Test and Evaluation Group
	Air Force Organizational Excellence Award	1 August 1999-31 July 2001	595th Test and Evaluation Group
	Air Force Organizational Excellence Award	1 October 2001-1 September 2002	595th Test and Evaluation Group (later 595th Space Group)
	Air Force Organizational Excellence Award	1 September 2002-1 September 2003	595th Space Group
	Air Force Organizational Excellence Award	2 September 2003-31 August 2004	595th Space Group
	Air Force Organizational Excellence Award	1 September 2004-31 August 2005	595th Space Group

== List of commanders ==
- Col Paul J. Burnett, 8 June 2000
- Col Michael J. Carey, 20 June 2002
- Col John E. Hyten, 1 July 2004
- Col John S. Riordan, 6 July 2005
- Col Stephen Latchford, 16 April 2007
- Col Shawn J. Barnes, May 2009
- Col Kevin M. Rhoades, 30 June 2011
- Unknown, 14 June 2012 – 1 April 2013
- Col Robert L. Billings, 1 October 2016 – July 2018
- Col. Jeremiah Baldwin, July 2018 - July 2020
- Col. Brian Golden, July 2020 - August 2022
- Col David Leaumont, August 2022 - August 2024
- Col Patrick Hook, August 2024 - 2024
- Col Daid Leaumont, 2024 – 28 February 2025
