= Offutt Air Force Base =

US Air Force base near Omaha, Nebraska

- Omaha, Nebraska in the United States
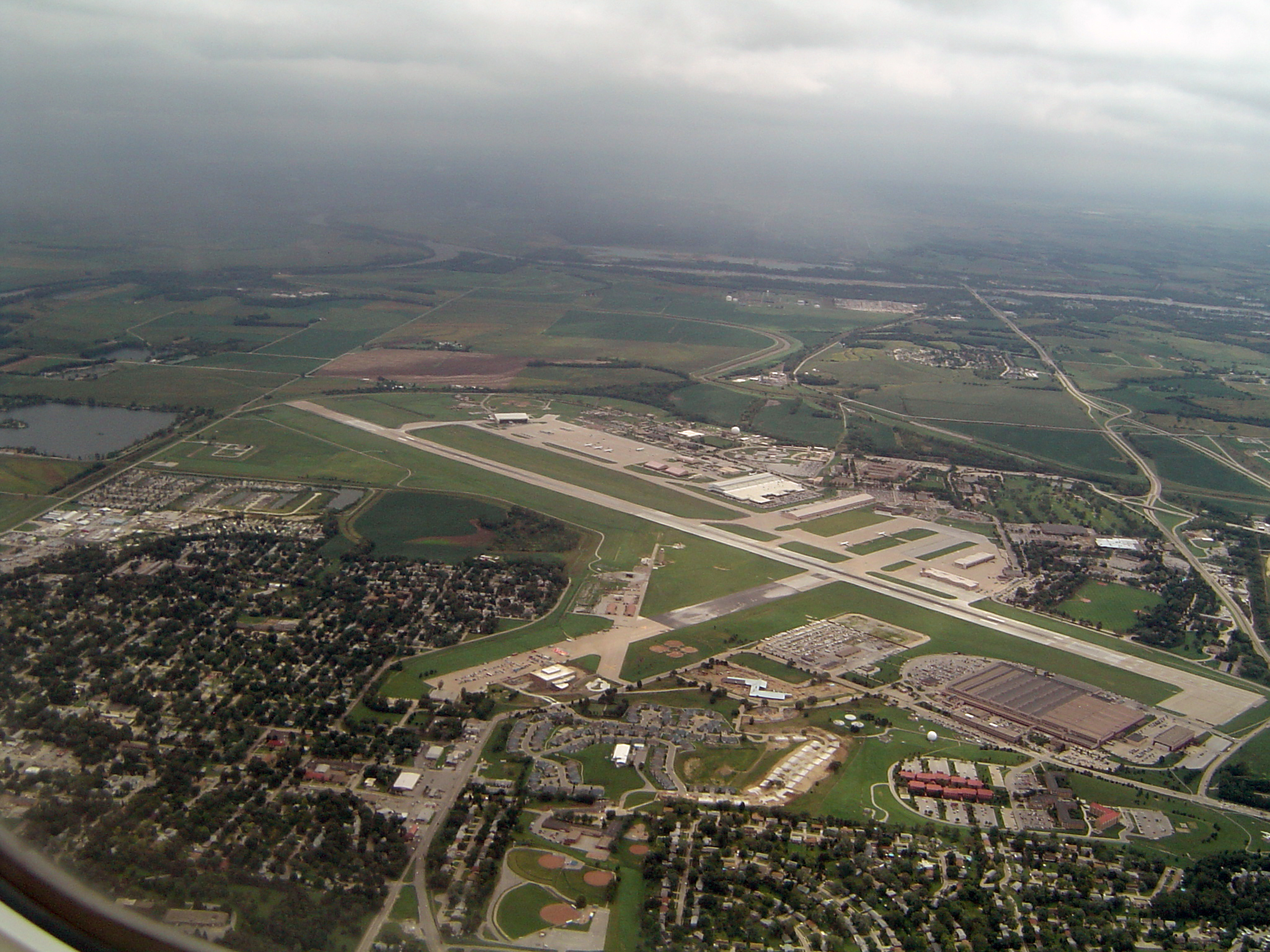
- An aerial view of Offutt AFB in 2007.

Site information
- Type: U.S. Air Force Base
- Owner: Department of Defense
- Operator: United States Air Force
- Controlled by: Air Combat Command (ACC)
- Condition: Operational
- Website: www.offutt.af.mil

Location
- Location within North America Location within the United States Location within Nebraska
- Coordinates: 41°07′10″N 095°54′31″W

Site history
- Built: 1921 (as part of Fort Crook)
- In use: 1921 – present

Garrison information
- Current commander: Colonel Mark Howard
- Garrison: 55th Wing (Host Wing)

Airfield information
- Identifiers: IATA: OFF, ICAO: KOFF, FAA LID: OFF, WMO: 725540
- Elevation: 319.7 metres (1,049 ft) AMSL
Runways
Direction	Length and surface
13/31	3,567 metres (11,703 ft) Concrete

Offutt Air Force Base /ˈɒfʌt/ (IATA: OFF, ICAO: KOFF, FAA LID: OFF) is a U.S. Air Force base south of Omaha, adjacent to Bellevue in Sarpy County, Nebraska. It is the headquarters of the U.S. Strategic Command (USSTRATCOM), the 557th Weather Wing, and the 55th Wing (55 WG) of the Air Combat Command (ACC), the latter serving as the host unit.

Aviation use at Offutt began in September 1918 during World War I as an Army Air Service balloon field. Originally named Fort Crook, it was renamed in honor of World War I pilot and Omaha native 1st Lt. Jarvis Offutt in 1924.

Offutt AFB's legacy includes the construction of the Enola Gay and Bockscar, the planes that dropped Little Boy and Fat Man over Hiroshima and Nagasaki in World War II. Offutt served over 40 years as the headquarters for the former Strategic Air Command (SAC) and home for its associated ground and aerial command centers for the United States in the case of nuclear war during the Cold War. The population was 8,901 at the 2000 census.

== History ==
Offutt AFB is named in honor of First Lieutenant Jarvis Jenness Offutt (26 October 1894 – 13 August 1918). The first native of Omaha to become a casualty in World War I, Lieutenant Offutt died of injuries sustained when his SE-5 fighter crashed during a training flight near Valheureux, France. The airfield portion of Fort Crook was designated Offutt Field on 6 May 1924.

=== Fort Crook ===
Offutt's history began with the commissioning by the War Department in 1890 of Fort Crook. Located some 10 miles south of Omaha and two miles west of the Missouri River, the fort was constructed between 1894 and 1896. The fort's namesake was Major General George Crook, a veteran of the Civil War and Indian Wars.

It was first used as a dispatch point for Indian conflicts on the Great Plains. Troops from Fort Crook fought during the Spanish–American War when the 22nd Regiment under Charles A. Wikoff was dispatched to Cuba. The regiment suffered heavy casualties in the Battle of El Caney. Only 165 of the 513 regiment members survived with most succumbing to tropical diseases after the battle.

The oldest surviving portion of Fort Crook is the parade grounds and surrounding red brick buildings that were constructed between 1894 and 1896. These structures are still in active use today as squadron headquarters, living quarters for high-ranking generals (Generals’ Row), and Nebraska's oldest operational jail.

=== Offutt Field ===
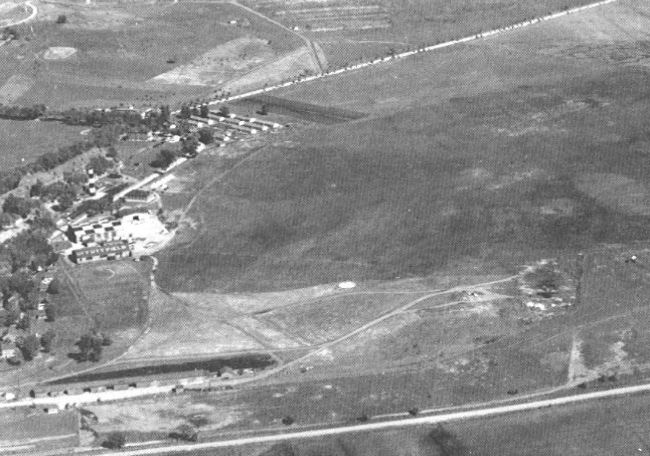
Offutt Field in October 1936, before the construction of hard runways and permanent facilities

In 1918, the 61st Balloon Company of the Army Air Corps, which performed combat reconnaissance training, was assigned to Fort Crook at the close of World War I. In the spring of 1921, the plowing, leveling, and seeding of 260 acres of land at Fort Crook created a grass airfield suitable for frequent takeoffs and landings and as a refueling stop for Post Office Department airmail flights and transcontinental flights. The first permanent aircraft hangars were also completed in 1921. Other known organizations assigned to the field were the 74th Balloon Company in November 1918; 60th Balloon Company in December 1918.

A small detachment of enlisted men (detached service) from Marshall Field and Fort Riley, Kansas, constituted the only regular military presence on the field between 1935 and 1940. On 6 May 1924, the airfield was officially named "Offutt Field". During the 1920s and 1930s, the field was used for inactive training period meetings by personnel of the 314th Observation Squadron, 89th Division, one of the few Organized Reserve flying squadrons that actually possessed facilities, equipment, and aircraft; the pilots conducted annual training at either Marshall Field, Fort Riley, Kansas, or Richards Field, Kansas City, Missouri. The squadron was inactivated on 2 October 1939 by relief of personnel, and disbanded on 31 May 1942.

=== Glenn L. Martin Bomber Plant ===
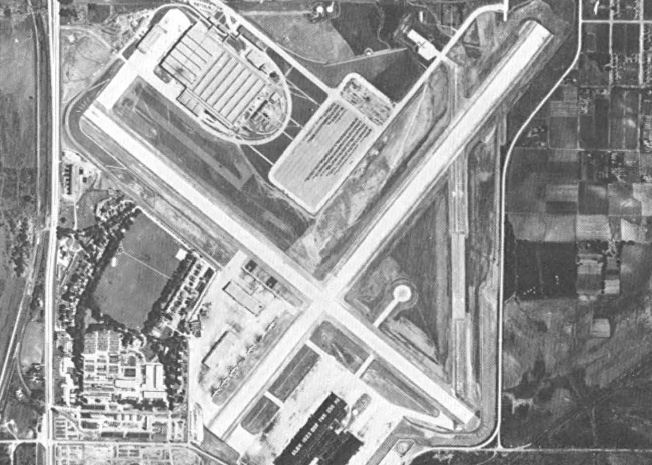
Offutt in the mid-1940s as a war production plant for the Glenn L. Martin company

In 1940 as American involvement in World War II loomed, the Army Air Corps chose Offutt Field as the site for a new bomber plant that was to be operated by the Glenn L. Martin Company. The plant's construction included a two-mile (3.2 km)-long concrete runway, six large hangars, and a 1,700,000-square-foot (160,000 m^{2}) aircraft-assembly building.

Production switched to B-29 Superfortress very heavy bombers in 1944, and 531 Superfortresses were produced before the end of World War II. Among these were the Enola Gay and Bockscar, the B-29s that dropped the first atomic weapons to be used in a military action (against the cities of Hiroshima and Nagasaki, Japan).

Production ended on 18 September 1945, when the last B-29 rolled out of the assembly building. With the manufacturing plant's closure, custody of the airfield and ground facilities were assumed by the 4131st Army Air Force Base Unit, Air Materiel Command.

=== Postwar use ===
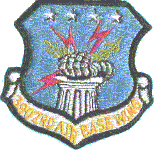
3902nd Air Base Wing insignia

In the initial months after the end of World War II, Offutt was used by the 2474th Separation Processing squadron to demobilize service members out of the armed forces after their return from overseas duty. In June 1946, the Army Air Force re-designated Fort Crook and the Martin-Nebraska facilities as Offutt Field. It became the headquarters for the Air Defense Command Second Air Force on 6 June. In 1947, the airfield opened for operational use, with the 381st Bombardment Group being assigned to the field with one squadron of B-29 Superfortresses, although the facility remained primarily a separation center.

The newly established United States Air Force took control of the facility in September 1947, and on 13 January 1948, it was renamed Offutt Air Force Base. Later that same year, on 26 September, the 3902nd Air Base Group (later Wing) became the host unit at Offutt under A. J. Beck.

=== Strategic Air Command ===
Strategic Air Command insignia

On 9 November 1948, Offutt became the host base for Headquarters Strategic Air Command, which was moved from Andrews AFB, Maryland. Secretary of the Air Force Stuart Symington chose to locate the Air Force's long-range atomic strike force at Offutt primarily because the base was centrally located on the North American continent, placing it well beyond the existing range of long-range, nuclear-armed bombers to (then) stay safely out of range of hostile missiles or bomber aircraft.

Offutt's population and facilities grew dramatically to keep pace with the increased operational demands during the Cold War. Several new dormitories and more than 2,000 family housing units – built in the late 1950s and 1960s under incremental Wherry and Capehart projects – quickly replaced the old quarters of Fort Crook. Headquarters SAC moved from the Martin-Nebraska complex to Building 500 in 1957, and new base facilities in the 1960s and 1970s included a hospital, main exchange, commissary, and library.

During the late 1950s, Offutt housed a Royal Air Force facility for servicing Avro Vulcans, which visited the air base frequently while on exercise with SAC.

Operational use of Offutt Air Force Base included the basing of alert tankers in the late 1950s and 1960s, support for intercontinental ballistic missile sites in Nebraska and Iowa in the 1960s, and worldwide reconnaissance from the mid-1960s to the present.

To provide air defense of the base, the United States Army established the Offutt AFB Defense Area, and Nike-Hercules surface-to-air missile sites were constructed during 1959. Sites were located near Cedar Creek, Nebraska (OF-60) 40°59′00″N 096°05′28″W, and Council Bluffs, Iowa (OF-10) 41°13′47″N 095°41′58″W. They were operational between November 1960 and March 1966. The missiles were operated by the 6th Battalion, 43rd Artillery.

During the Cold War, a general and various support personnel from the base were airborne 24 hours a day on an EC-135 from 3 February 1961 to 24 July 1990 in Operation Looking Glass, creating an airborne command post in case of war.

The 3902d Air Base Wing was inactivated on 1 March 1986, and the 55th Strategic Reconnaissance Wing assumed host-unit responsibilities for Offutt. Increased defense spending during the 1980s brought additional operational improvements to Offutt, including the Bennie Davis Aircraft Maintenance Hangar, and a new command center for Headquarters SAC.

=== U.S. Strategic Command ===
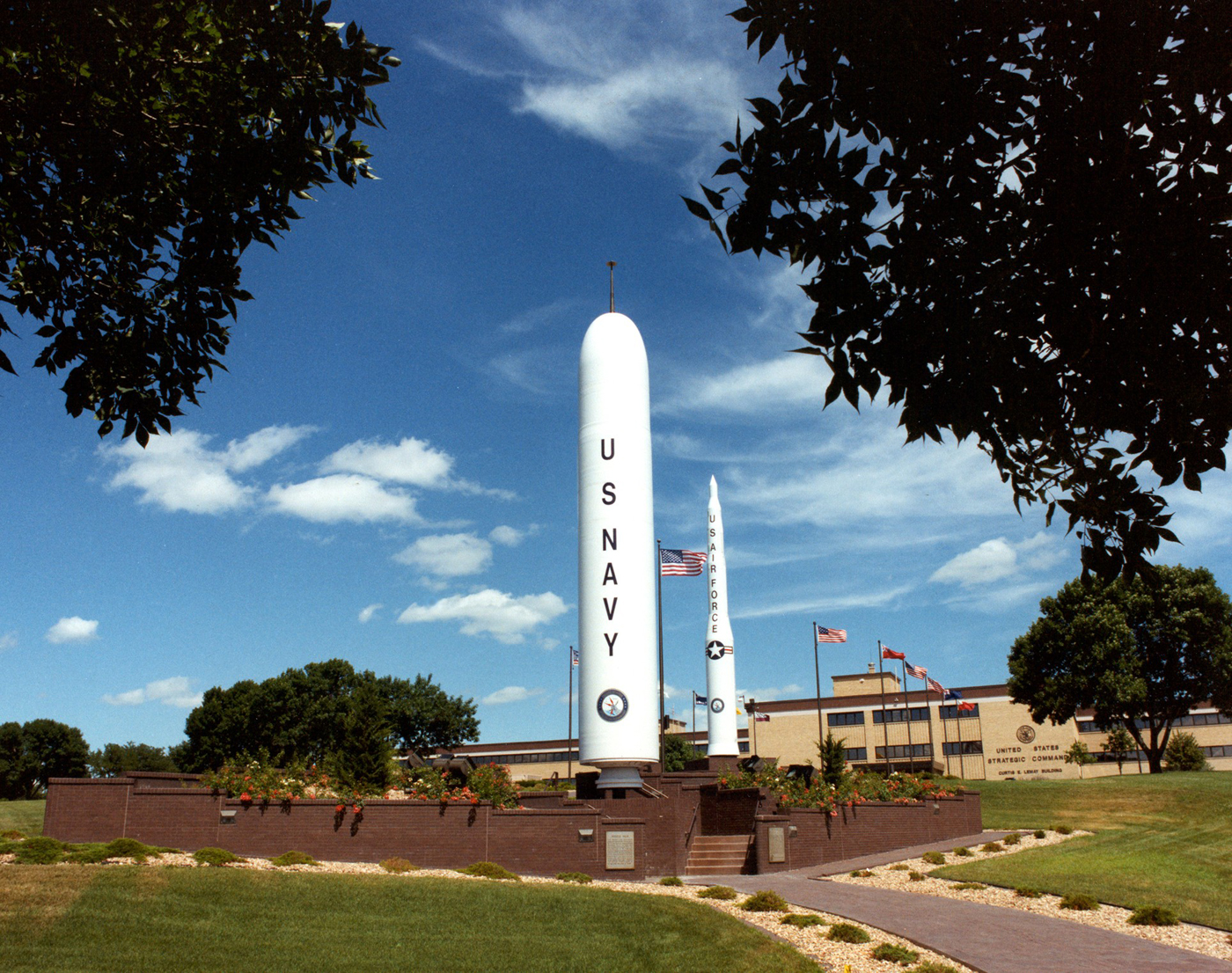
Gen. Curtis E. LeMay Building, U.S. Strategic Command Headquarters

Offutt again faced changes in 1992 when the easing of world tensions allowed the United States to reorganize the Air Force. The Strategic Air Command was inactivated on 1 June, succeeded by the U.S. Strategic Command (USSTRATCOM), a Unified Combatant Command of the Department of Defense. The 55th Strategic Wing then became the 55th Wing, under the newly created Air Combat Command.

In 1998, the Strategic Air and Space Museum moved thirty miles (50 km) southwest to Ashland, just off Interstate 80, midway between Omaha and Lincoln.

In 2005, Offutt began several major renovations. The on-base Wherry housing area was demolished for replacement with new housing. A new fire house, AAFES mini-mall, and U.S. Post Office were completed in 2006. Additionally, the Air Force Weather Agency broke ground on a new facility which was completed in 2008.

The new headquarters for STRATCOM, the Command and Control Facility (C2F), is expected to be operational in September 2018.

The base sustained significant damage in the spring of 2019 as a result of the Missouri River flooding; at one point, almost half of the base's runway was underwater. Flight operations and some support staff were temporarily relocated to nearby Lincoln Air National Guard Base while repairs (as well as some pre-planned construction projects) were undertaken.

=== President Bush Offutt Conference on September 11, 2001 ===
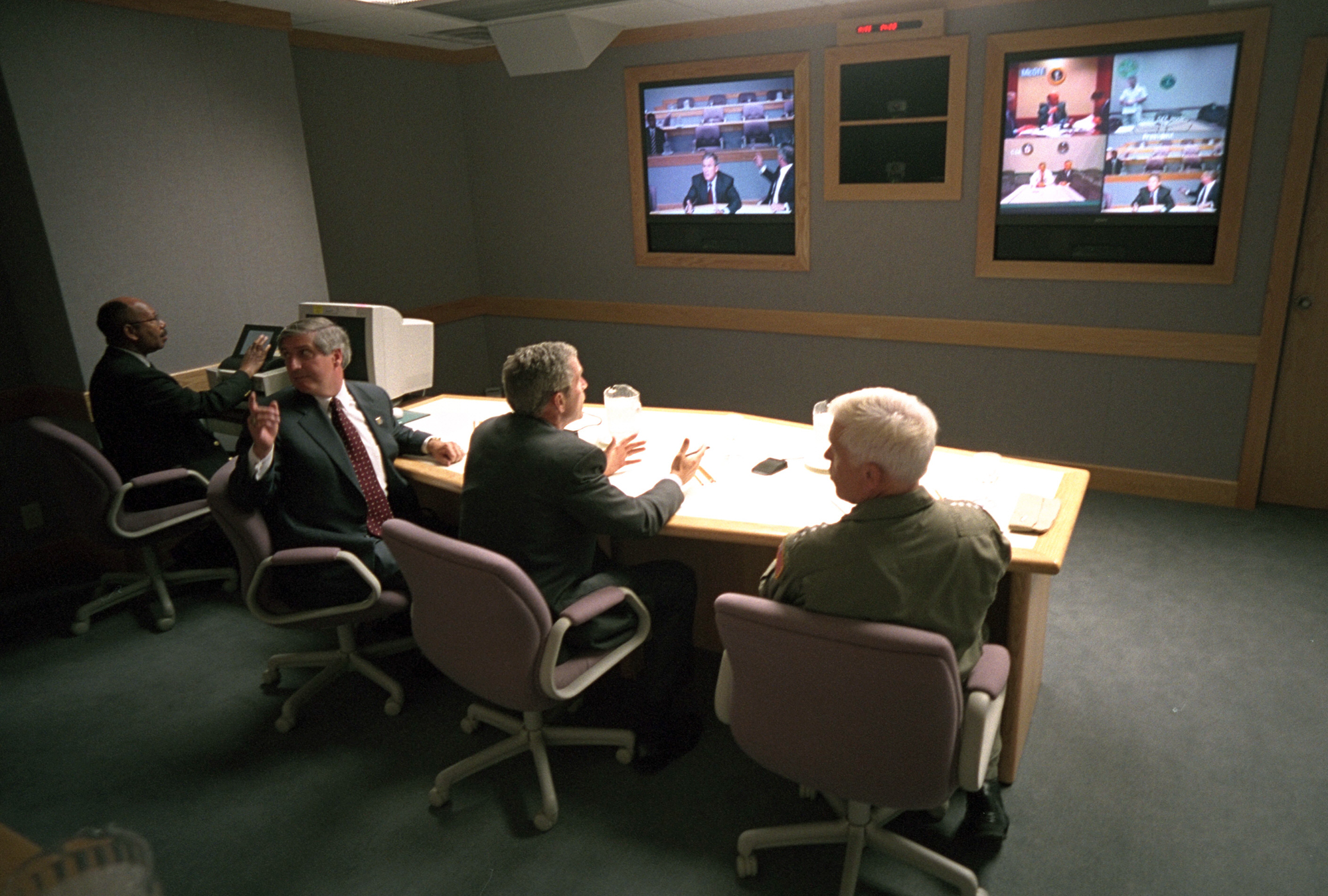
President George W. Bush at the Offutt AFB command bunker on 11 September 2001

On September 11, 2001, President George W. Bush conducted one of the first major strategy sessions for the response to the September 11 attacks from a bunker at the base.

Bush, who was in Florida at the Emma Booker Elementary School in Sarasota at the time of the attacks, first flew from Sarasota-Bradenton International Airport to Barksdale AFB in Louisiana and then to Offutt en route back to Washington, DC. Bush arrived at 2:50pm, conducted a video conference in an underground command bunker and left for Washington, DC at 4:30pm.

Air Force One left Barksdale AFB for Offutt AFB around 1:30 p.m. The Air Force One entourage was pared down to a few essential staffers such as Ari Fleischer, Andrew Card, Karl Rove, Dan Bartlett, Brian Montgomery, and Gordon Johndroe, plus about five reporters. During the flight, Bush remained in "continuous contact" with both the White House Situation Room and Vice President Dick Cheney in the Presidential Emergency Operations Center.

Air Force One landed at Offutt shortly before 3:00 p.m. At 3:06 p.m, Bush passed through security to the US Strategic Command Underground Command Center (41°06′50″N 095°55′04″W) and was taken into an underground bunker designed to withstand a nuclear blast. There, he held a teleconference call with Vice President Cheney, National Security Advisor Condoleezza Rice, Defense Secretary Donald Rumsfeld, Deputy Secretary of State Richard Armitage, CIA Director George Tenet, Transportation Secretary Norman Mineta, and others. The meeting lasted about an hour. Rice recalled that during the meeting, Tenet told Bush, "Sir, I believe it's al-Qaeda. We're doing the assessment but it looks like, it feels like, it smells like al-Qaeda." The White House staff was preparing for Bush to address the nation from the Offutt bunker, but Bush decided instead to return to Washington. Air Force One left Offutt around 4:30 p.m.

=== Whistleblower suit ===
In May 2011, base civilian employee George Sarris successfully settled with the government over claims that he was subjected to retaliation for talking to the media in 2008 about poor maintenance of RC-135 aircraft at the base. After Sarris' allegations appeared in the Kansas City Star, base officials revoked his security clearance and reassigned him to menial duties. Later investigations by the government substantiated many of Sarris' claims. As part of the settlement, the USAF agreed to pay Sarris his full salary until he retired in 2014 and paid $21,000 of his attorney's fees. After retiring, Sarris published a book titled, Cowardice in Leadership – A Lesson in Harassment, Intimidation, and Reprisals. Ten years after Sarris blew the whistle, the Omaha World Herald published a three-part series titled "In-flight emergency", which confirmed his earlier claims.

=== Previous names ===
- Fort Crook, 3 March 1891
- Offutt Flying Field, Fort Crook, 1920
- Offutt Field, 6 May 1924

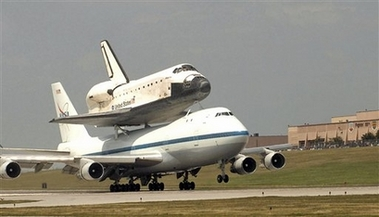
Space Shuttle Atlantis being shuttled through Offutt following a mission on 1 July 2007

=== Major commands to which assigned ===
- Seventh Corps Area, United States Army, 1920
- Army Air Forces Materiel Command, 13 October 1942
- Army Air Forces Materiel and Services Command, 1944

Redesignated: AAF Technical Service Comd, 31 August 1944
Redesignated: Air Technical Service Command, 1945
Redesignated: Air Materiel Command, 9 March 1946
: The United States Army Seventh Service Command exercised overall jurisdiction until 11 June 1946

- Air Defense Command, 11 June 1946
- Strategic Air Command, 1 October 1948
- Air Combat Command, 1 June 1992

=== Major units assigned ===
- Second Air Force, 6 June 1946 – 1 July 1948
- 381st Bombardment Group, 24 July 1947 – 27 June 1949
- Tenth Air Force, 1 July – 24 August 1948
- 3902d Air Base Group (later Wing), 26 September 1948 – 1 March 1986
- Strategic Air Command, 8 November 1948 – 1 June 1992
- 438th Troop Carrier Wing, 27 June 1949 – 14 March 1951
- 5th Air Division, 14 January – 25 May 1951
- 1st Weather Group, 20 April 1952 – 8 October 1956
- 544th Strategic Intelligence Wing, 12 April 1952 – 1 June 1992
- 3d Weather Wing, 8 October 1956 – 1 June 1992
- 34th Air Refueling Squadron, 1 October 1958 – 25 June 1966
- 4321st Strategic Wing, 1 October 1959 – 1 January 1963
- 549th Strategic Missile Squadron, 1 July 1961 – 15 December 1964
- 385th Strategic Aerospace Wing, 1 January 1963 – 15 December 1964
- 55th Strategic Reconnaissance Wing (and subsequent redesignations), 16 August 1966 – present
- Air Force Global Weather Center (and subsequent redesignations), 8 July 1969 – present
- 1st Airborne Command and Control Squadron (and subsequent redesignations), 1 July 1977 – present
- United States Strategic Command, 1 June 1992 – present
- 55th Electronic Combat Group, 1 April 1992 – present
- General Curtis Lemay Offutt Composite Squadron Civil Air Patrol
- 595th Command and Control Group, 16 October 2016 – present
- 95th Wing, 1 November 2024 – present

- 1st Air COMM Group, then 1st Air Comm Wing, then 1st Air Information Systems Wing at least August 1984 – April 1988. The Squadrons were 390th, 1850th, 1851st, and the 1853rd.

=== Intercontinental ballistic missile facilities ===
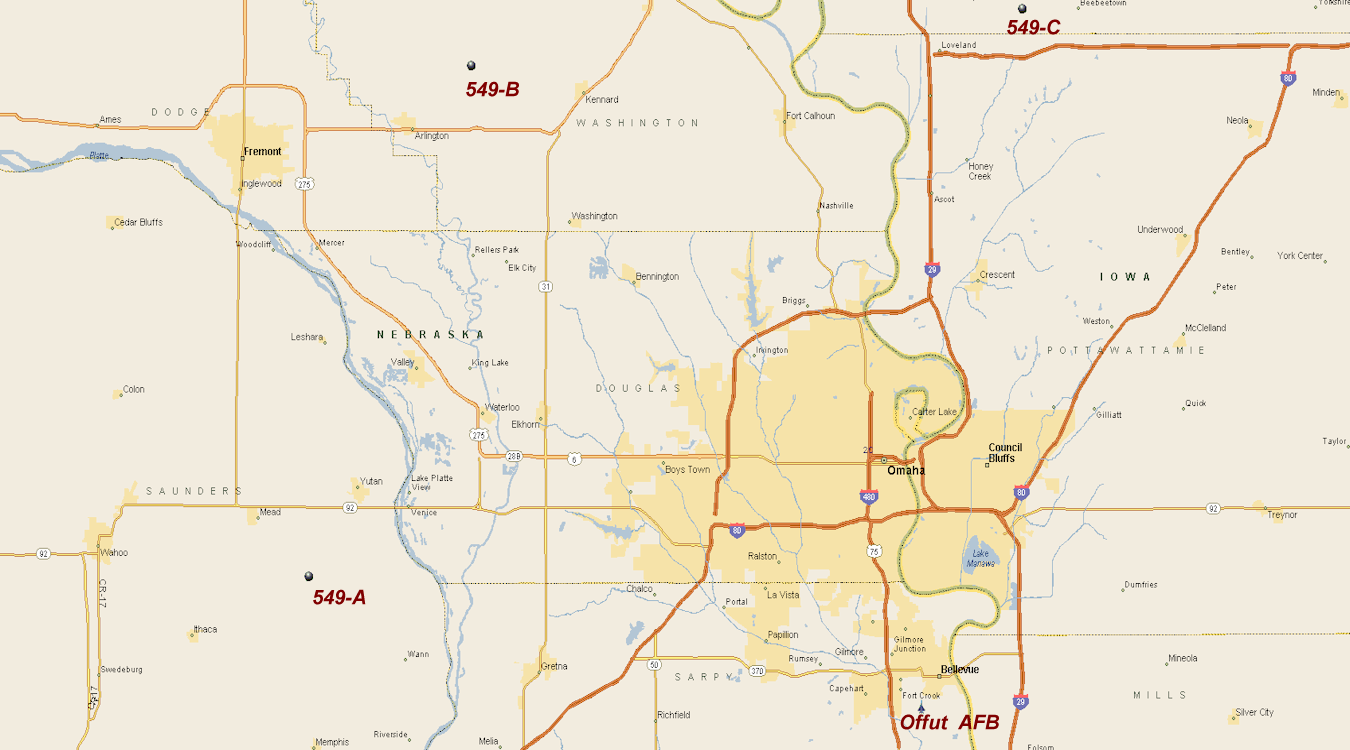
SM-65D Atlas Missile Sites

The 549th Strategic Missile Squadron operated three SM-65D Atlas ICBM sites (1 October 1960 – 15 December 1964). Each site was composed of three missile silos (9 total).

- 549-A, 3.4 mi SE of Mead, NE 41°11′37″N 096°26′23″W
- 549-B, 3.6 mi NE of Arlington, NE 41°29′17″N 096°17′59″W
- 549-C, 4.3 mi SE of Missouri Valley, IA 41°31′15″N 095°49′09″W

Beginning in 1958, the Army Corps of Engineers began planning for the sites, and construction began in 1959. The construction project was completed on 28 July 1960. In April and May 1961, the three complexes became the last Atlas D missiles to go on alert.

The missiles were manned by the 549th Strategic Missile Squadron which was activated on 1 October 1960. The squadron began to phase down with the inactivation of the Atlas-D on 1 October 1964, and was inactivated 14 December 1964. Confusingly, the squadron was originally the 566th but on 1 July 1961 SAC swapped designators with the 549th at F.E. Warren AFB. The 549th SMS was under the 385th Strategic Aerospace Wing.

Site "A" was abandoned for many years, until the late 1970s when the Nebraska National Guard took over ownership of the site to establish a training area called the Mead Training Site. The site is managed by the Camp Ashland Training Site Command. The training area has been used by the National Guard, United States Air Force, local law enforcement, and other entities as a training site for many years. 3/209th RTI out of Camp Ashland began using Mead Training Site in 2008 as the primary training facility for their 88M military occupational specialty reclassification school and continues to use the site year round. A MOUT site (Military Operations in Urban Terrain) was constructed at the site in 2009. Two Nebraska National Guard armories were built directly alongside the training area in 2012. Many other National Guard units use the site for drill weekends and annual trainings. Airmen out of Offutt Air Force Base practice Survival, Evasion, Resistance and Escape (SERE) Training at the site several weekends a year.

Site "B" is in use for agricultural storage. Site "C" has been demolished, with only the access roads remaining.

=== 2019 shooting ===
In September 2019, a shooting took place in Offutt's private housing community, in which Sgt. Zachary Firlik and his wife Kari Firlik were killed. The case was identified as a murder-suicide. The shooter, Zachary Firlik, was an active off-duty airman who killed his wife and then himself. Their five year-old daughter was downstairs at the time, and fled the house after hearing gunshots.

=== Unauthorized photographs ===
In April 2026, a Chinese student was arrested and charged with illegally taking photos of an RC-135 and E-4B from outside the base.

== Role and operations ==
Offutt Air Force Base is the host station for the 55th Wing (55 WG), the largest wing of the United States Air Force's Air Combat Command. Additionally, the base is home to many significant associate units, including US Strategic Command Headquarters, the 557th Weather Wing, the Omaha operating location of the Defense Finance and Accounting Service, and many others.

=== 55th Wing ===
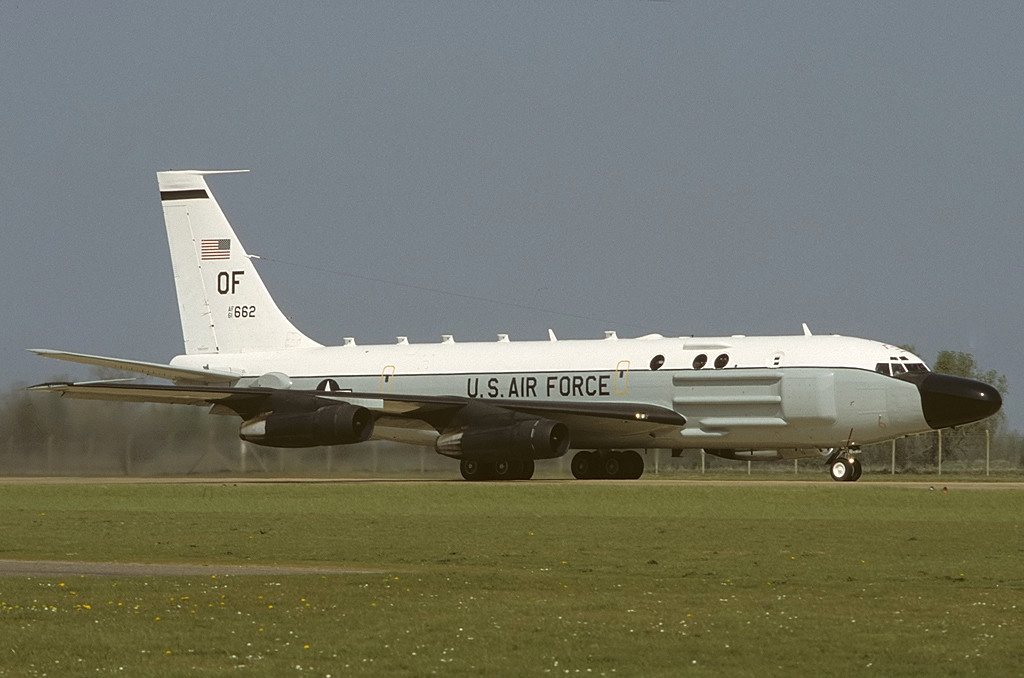
A Boeing RC-135S 'Cobra Ball' of the 55th Wing based at Offutt AFB.

The 55th Wing is composed of five groups at Offutt AFB and at various locations worldwide:

- 55th Operations Group

The 55th Operations Group, Air Combat Command's (ACC) largest group, has operational control over 11 squadrons and two detachments worldwide. The group consists of approximately 3,200 personnel. It employs 46 aircraft, including 13 models of seven different types. The 55th Operations Group uses the tail code OF for its aircraft

38th Reconnaissance Squadron (RC-135)
343d Reconnaissance Squadron (RC-135)
45th Reconnaissance Squadron (OC-135, RC-135, TC-135, WC-135)
338th Combat Training Squadron (Simulator)
82d Reconnaissance Squadron (RC-135)

Operates from Kadena AB, Japan

95th Reconnaissance Squadron (RC-135)

Operates from: RAF Mildenhall, England

- 55th Electronic Combat Group

The 55th Electronic Combat Group, stationed at Davis–Monthan Air Force Base, is an operations group and geographically separated unit (GSU) of the 55th Wing. It consists of 5 squadrons, 3 flying squadrons, 1 support squadron and 1 maintenance squadron. All 3 flying squadrons utilize various models of the EC-130 aircraft.

41st Electronic Combat Squadron (ECS)
42d Electronic Combat Squadron (ECS)
43d Electronic Combat Squadron (ECS)
755th Operations Support Squadron (OSS)
755th Aircraft Maintenance Squadron (AMXS)

- 55th Maintenance Group

The 55th Maintenance Operations Squadron provides centralized direction of all maintenance staff functions providing support to world-wide aircraft reconnaissance missions.

- 55th Mission Support Group

The 55th Mission Support Group provides mission support for Offutt AFB through engineering, security, mission support, services, supply, transportation, contracting & deployment readiness programs.

- 55th Communications Group

The 55th Communications Group provides worldwide command, control, communications and computer (C4) systems, information management and combat support to warfighting and national leadership. It also provides communications technology and support to the 55th Wing and 44 tenant units.

- 55th Medical Group

The 55th Medical Group serves 28K enrolled patients with outpatient clinic capabilities, and ancillary support.

=== 595th Command and Control Group ===
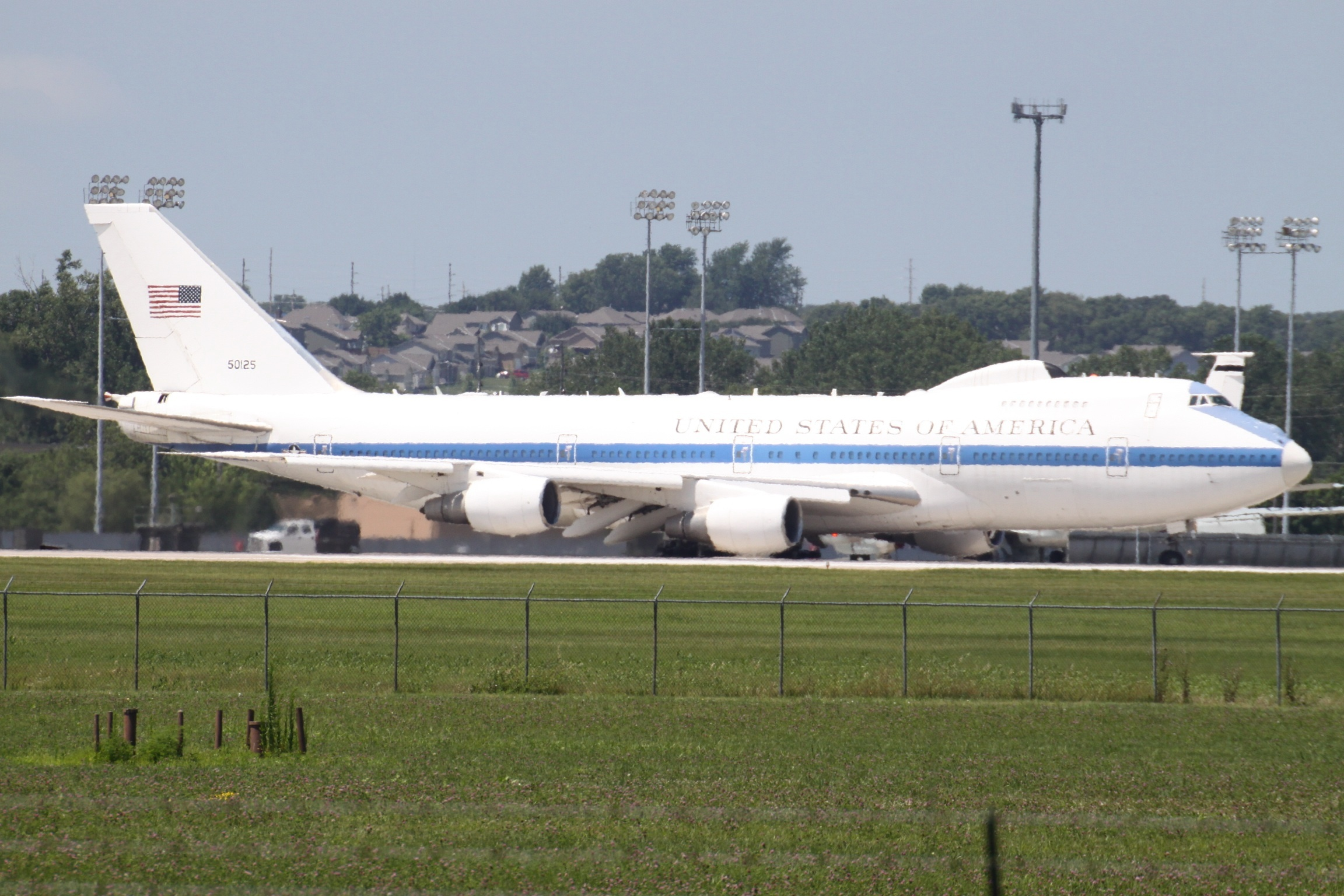
A Boeing E-4B of the 1st Airborne Command and Control Squadron seen at Offutt AFB in 2012.

The 595th Command and Control Group (C2G) was activated in a ceremony held on 6 October 2016.

The mission of the 595th C2G is to consolidate the Air Force's portion of the nuclear triad, including Air Force nuclear command and control communications, under the auspices of Air Force Global Strike Command (AFGSC). Previously, portions of the Air Force's command and control of nuclear operations had been divided among AFGSC, Air Combat Command, and the Twentieth Air Force.

The 595th Command and Control Group is composed of four squadrons:

- 1st Airborne Command and Control Squadron
- 595th Strategic Communications Squadron
- 595th Aircraft Maintenance Squadron
- 625th Strategic Operations Squadron

=== 557th Weather Wing ===
The 557th Weather Wing, formerly the Air Force Weather Agency, is headquartered at Offutt AFB. It is the lead weather center of the United States Air Force.

United States Strategic Command

=== United States Strategic Command ===
Offutt AFB is the headquarters of United States Strategic Command (USSTRATCOM), which is one of the ten Unified Combatant Commands of the United States Department of Defense (DoD). USSTRATCOM was established in 1992 as a successor to Strategic Air Command (SAC).

It is charged with space operations (such as military satellites), information operations (such as information warfare), missile defense, global command and control, intelligence, surveillance, and reconnaissance (C4ISR), global strike and strategic deterrence (the United States nuclear arsenal), and combating weapons of mass destruction.

== Based units ==
Flying and notable non-flying units based at Offutt Air Force Base.

Units marked GSU are Geographically Separate Units, which although based at Offutt, are subordinate to a parent unit based at another location.

=== United States Air Force ===
Air Combat Command (ACC)

- Sixteenth Air Force
  - 55th Wing (Host Wing)
    - 55th Operations Group
      - 38th Reconnaissance Squadron – RC-135V/W Rivet Joint, TC-135W
      - 45th Reconnaissance Squadron – OC-135B Open Skies, RC-135S Cobra Ball, RC-135U Combat Sent, TC-135W, WC-135W Constant Phoenix
      - 55th Intelligence Support Squadron
      - 55th Operations Support Squadron
      - 97th Intelligence Squadron
      - 338th Combat Training Squadron – RC-135, OC-135, WC-135
      - 343rd Reconnaissance Squadron – RC-135V/W Rivet Joint, TC-135W
      - 390th Intelligence Squadron
      - 488th Intelligence Squadron
    - 55th Communications Group
      - 55th Cyberspace Squadron
      - 55th Strategic Communications Squadron
    - 55th Maintenance Group
      - 55th Aircraft Maintenance Squadron
      - 55th Maintenance Squadron
    - 55th Medical Group
      - 55th Operational Medical Readiness Squadron
      - 55th Dental Squadron
      - 55th Medical Operations Squadron
      - 55th Medical Support Squadron
    - 55th Mission Support Group
      - 55th Civil Engineering Squadron
      - 55th Contracting Squadron
      - 55th Force Support Squadron
      - 55th Logistics Readiness Flight
      - 55th Security Forces Squadron
  - 363rd Intelligence, Surveillance and Reconnaissance Wing
    - 363rd Intelligence, Surveillance and Reconnaissance Group
      - 20th Intelligence Squadron (GSU)
  - 557th Weather Wing
    - 1st Weather Group
    - 2nd Weather Group
      - 2nd Weather Squadron
      - 2nd Weather Support Squadron
      - 2nd Systems Operations Squadron
      - 16th Weather Squadron
      - American Forces Network Weather Center

Air Force Global Strike Command (AFGSC)

- Eighth Air Force
  - 595th Command and Control Group
    - 1st Airborne Command Control Squadron – E-4B Advanced Airborne Command Post
    - 595th Aircraft Maintenance Squadron
    - 595th Strategic Communications Squadron
    - 625th Strategic Operations Squadron

Air Force Reserve Command (AFRC)

- Tenth Air Force
  - 655th Intelligence, Surveillance and Reconnaissance Wing
    - 655th Intelligence, Surveillance and Reconnaissance Group
      - 49th Intelligence Squadron (GSU)
    - 755th Intelligence, Surveillance and Reconnaissance Group
      - 820th Intelligence Squadron (GSU)
  - 960th Cyberspace Wing
    - 960th Cyberspace Operations Group
      - 52nd Network Warfare Squadron (GSU)

Air National Guard (ANG)

- Nebraska Air National Guard
  - 170th Group
    - 170th Operations Support Squadron
    - 238th Combat Training Squadron – RC-135, OC-135, WC-135

=== Department of Defense ===
United States Strategic Command (USSTRATCOM)

- Headquarters United States Strategic Command
- Global Operations Center

Defense POW/MIA Accounting Agency (DPAA)

- Headquarters Defense POW/MIA Accounting Agency

== General's Row ==
Most of the high-ranking officials at Offutt live on General's Row, a row of 4-story duplexes that were built in 1895.

== Radio transmissions ==
Because of its central position in the US, radio traffic to and from Offutt is often heard by shortwave listeners on 11175 kHz, USB.

== Demographics ==
Historical population
Census	Pop.	Note	%±
2020	5,363		—
U.S. Decennial Census

Offutt AFB, Nebraska
- CDP
- Location of Offutt AFB, Nebraska

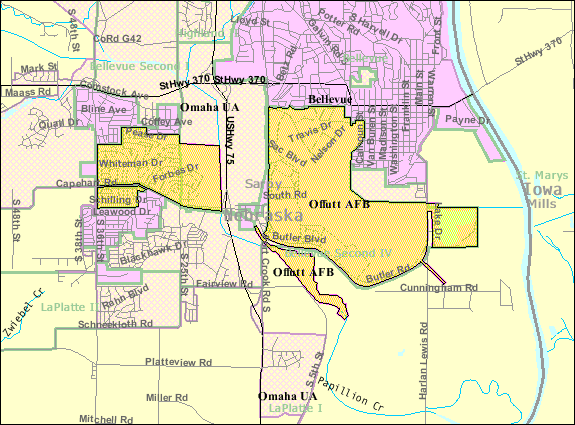
- U.S. Census map
- Country: United States
- State: Nebraska
- County: Sarpy

Area
  - Total: 4.17 sq mi (10.80 km^{2})
  - Land: 3.97 sq mi (10.27 km^{2})
  - Water: 0.20 sq mi (0.53 km^{2})
- Elevation: 988 ft (301 m)

Population (2020)
  - Total: 5,363
  - Density: 1,352.9/sq mi (522.35/km^{2})
- Time zone: UTC-6 (Central (CST))
  - Summer (DST): UTC-5 (CDT)
- FIPS code: 31-35945
- GNIS feature ID: 0837659
- Website: www.stratcom.mil

As of the census of 2000, there were 8,901 people, 2,304 households, and 2,255 families residing on the base. The population density was 2,113.1 people per square mile (816.3/km^{2}). There were 2,429 housing units at an average density of 576.6/sq mi (222.8/km^{2}). The racial makeup of the base was 78.0% White, 10.4% Black or African American, 0.7% Native American, 2.7% Asian, 0.3% Pacific Islander, 3.6% from other races, and 4.3% from two or more races. Hispanic or Latino of any race were 7.4% of the population.

There were 2,304 households, out of which 79.1% had children under the age of 18 living with them, 90.5% were married couples living together, 5.3% had a female householder with no husband present, and 2.1% were non-families. 1.9% of all households were made up of individuals, and none had someone living alone who was 65 years of age or older. The average household size was 3.61 and the average family size was 3.64.

On the base the population was spread out, with 41.9% under the age of 18, 16.8% from 18 to 24, 39.7% from 25 to 44, 1.4% from 45 to 64, and 0.1% who were 65 years of age or older. The median age was 22 years. For every 100 females, there were 105.4 males. For every 100 females age 18 and over, there were 109.7 males.

The median income for a household on the base was $36,742, and the median income for a family was $36,619. Males had a median income of $25,391 versus $21,593 for females. The per capita income for the base was $11,580. About 4.4% of families and 5.6% of the population were below the poverty line, including 7.1% of those under age 18 and none of those age 65 or over.

== Geography ==
Offutt Air Force Base is located at 41°06′49″N 95°55′42″W.

According to the United States Census Bureau, the base has a total area of 4.3 square miles (11.3 km^{2}), of which, 4.2 square miles (10.9 km^{2}) of it is land and 0.1 square miles (0.4 km^{2}) of it (3.22%) is water.

== Education ==
Dependent children living in base housing are zoned to Bellevue Public Schools. The school district operates three schools in the Capehart housing area. They are: Fort Crook Elementary School, Lemay Elementary School, and Peter Sarpy Elementary School.

Physically most of the base is in BPS while a portion is physically in the Papillion-La Vista School District.

== Offutt in popular culture ==
Offutt was brought to popular attention during its SAC period when the command was depicted in the 1955 film Strategic Air Command starring Jimmy Stewart, the 1963 film A Gathering of Eagles starring Rock Hudson, and 1964's Fail-Safe starring Henry Fonda (which not only claimed to show portions of the base but also a nearby Omaha neighborhood) and Dr. Strangelove or: How I Learned to Stop Worrying and Love the Bomb starring Peter Sellers (which depicts a nuclear first strike from a mad general at the fictional Burpelson Air Force Base).

Offutt appeared in the Star Trek episode "Tomorrow Is Yesterday" (identified as 'the Omaha installation'), when a fighter pilot stationed there detects the approaching USS Enterprise and is transported aboard.

The Dale Brown novel Plan of Attack saw nuclear missiles launched by Russian bombers attacking multiple bomber bases all over the U.S., including Offutt, which is destroyed by four Kh-15 (AS-17 Kickback) missiles. Only one Boeing E-4 NEACP escapes in time, and the officials of the Eighth Air Force and STRATCOM are eliminated in the process. Pat Frank's iconic Cold War novel Alas, Babylon (1959) has Air Force Colonel Mark Bragg, the brother of the protagonist Randy Bragg, stationed at Offut.

in interviews, it is alleged that MK Ultra programming and testing took place on Offut Air Force Base, as well as a few others .

In the 1983 post apocalyptic feature film for television, "The Day After", Offutt is represented as a SAC Aircraft departs the field as the cameras then change focus to the countryside as the credits roll.

Offutt is also mentioned in Strike Three, a post-apocalyptic novel, by Joy V. Smith.

An aerial view of Offutt is used as a photographic reference on an SCPF Secure Facility Dossier for Site-19.

== See also ==
- Nebraska World War II Army Airfields
- SAC Elite Guard
- David Wade, Strategic Air Command chief of staff at Offutt in middle 1950s

== Other sources ==
- This article incorporates public domain material from the Air Force Historical Research Agency
- This article incorporates public domain material from Offutt Air Force Base. United States Air Force.
- Maurer, Maurer. Air Force Combat Units of World War II. Washington, D.C.: U.S. Government Printing Office 1961 (republished 1983, Office of Air Force History, ISBN 0-912799-02-1).
- Ravenstein, Charles A. Air Force Combat Wings Lineage and Honors Histories 1947–1977. Maxwell Air Force Base, Alabama: Office of Air Force History 1984. ISBN 0-912799-12-9.
- Mueller, Robert. Air Force Bases Volume I, Active Air Force Bases Within the United States of America on 17 September 1982, Office of Air Force History, 1989
