= Boeing E-4 =

US Air Force airborne command squadron aircraft

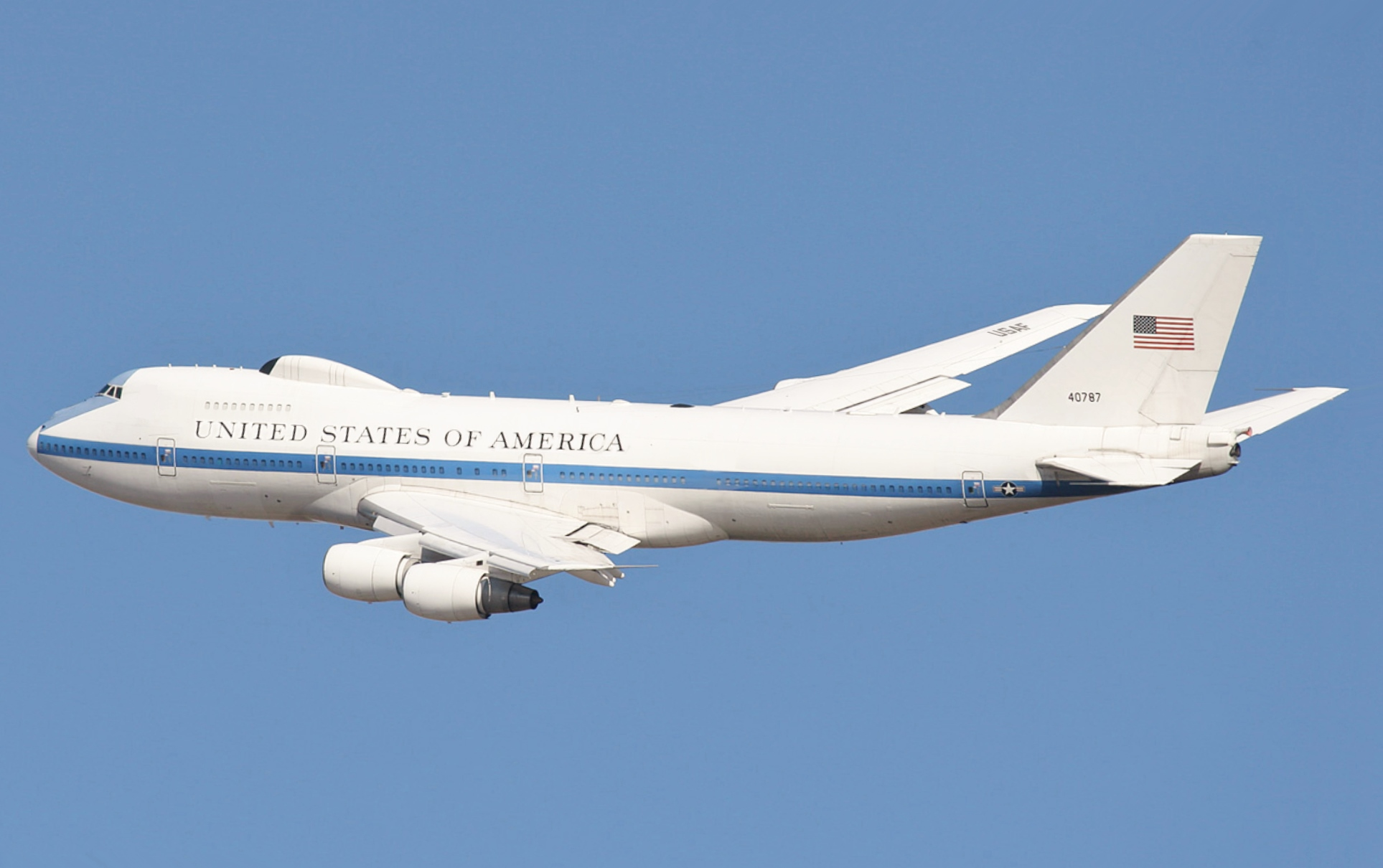
- An E-4B in flight

General information
- Role: Airborne strategic command and control post
- National origin: United States
- Manufacturer: Boeing
- Status: In service
- Primary user: United States Air Force
- Number built: 4

History
- Introduction date: 1974
- First flight: 13 June 1973
- Developed from: Boeing 747-200
- Successors: SNC E-4C Survivable Airborne Operations Center

The Boeing E-4 Advanced Airborne Command Post (AACP), the current "Nightwatch" aircraft, is a series of strategic command and control military aircraft operated by the United States Air Force (USAF). The E-4 series are specially modified from the Boeing 747-200B for the National Emergency Airborne Command Post (NEACP) program. One of its primary purposes is continuity of government during nuclear warfare, thus being nicknamed the "Doomsday plane".

The E-4 serves as a survivable mobile command post for the National Command Authority, namely the president of the United States, the secretary of defense, and successors. The four E-4s are operated by the 1st Airborne Command and Control Squadron of the 595th Command and Control Group located at Offutt Air Force Base, near Omaha, Nebraska. An E-4 when in action is denoted a "National Airborne Operations Center" (NAOC).

The E-4B aircraft are to be replaced by the SNC E-4C Survivable Airborne Operations Center.

== Development ==
Two of the original 747-200 airframes were originally planned to be commercial airliners. When the airline did not complete the order, Boeing offered the airframes to the United States Air Force, as part of a package leading to a replacement for the older EC-135J National Emergency Airborne Command Post (NEACP). Under the 481B NEACP program the Air Force Electronic Systems Division awarded Boeing a contract in February 1973 for two unequipped aircraft, designated E-4A, powered by four P&W JT9D engines, to which a third aircraft was added in July 1973.

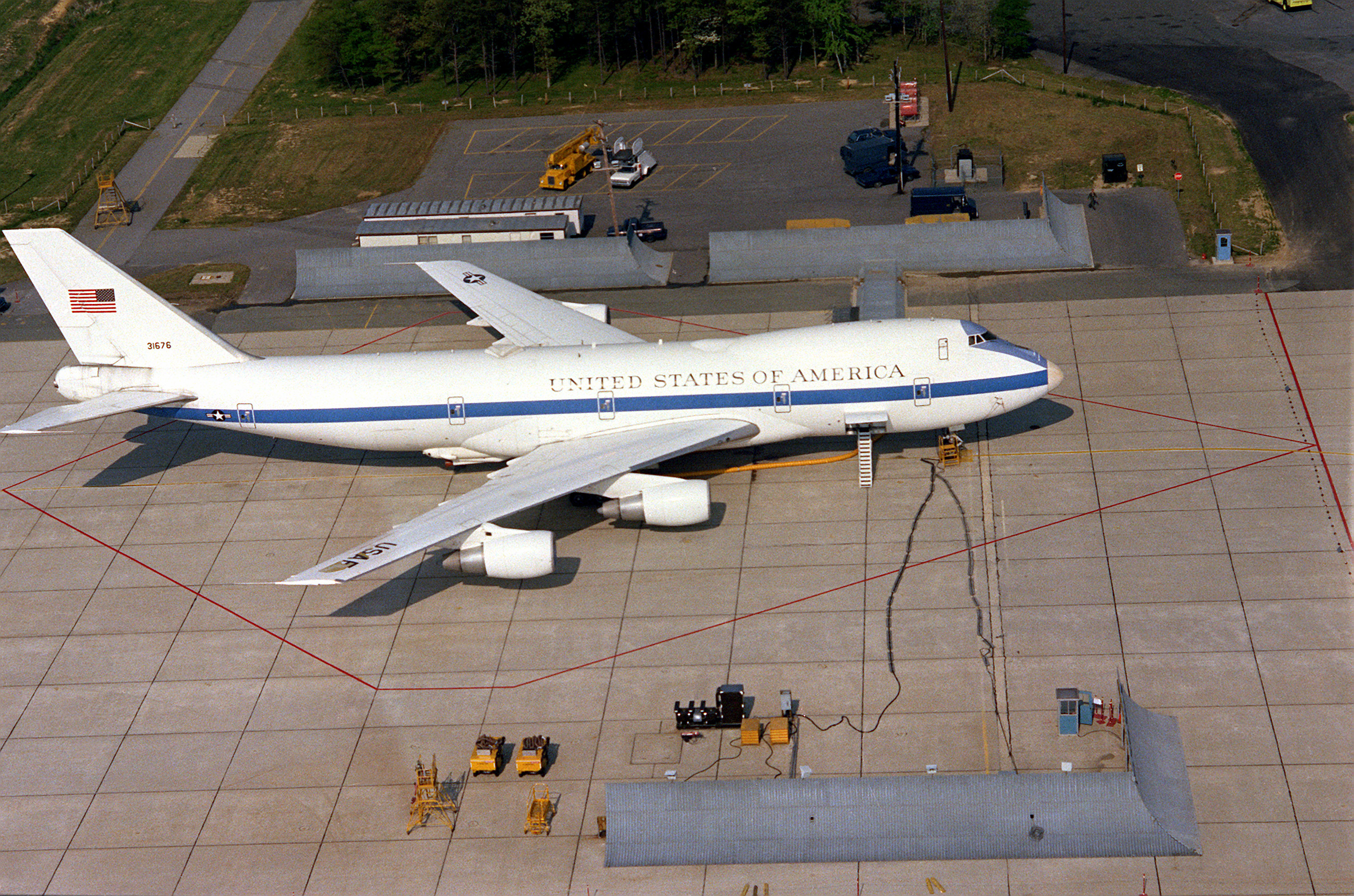
Aerial view of an E-4A parked at Andrews AFB in 1981, showing the lack of the SHF antenna radome on top of the fuselage that was later added during conversion to E-4B specifications

In 1973, the first E-4A was completed at the Boeing plant in Everett, Washington. E-Systems won the contract to install interim equipment in these three aircraft. In July 1973, the first completed E-4A was delivered to Andrews Air Force Base, Maryland. The next two were delivered in October 1973 and October 1974. The third E-4A was powered by the GE F103 engine, which was later made standard and retrofitted to the previous two aircraft. The A-model effectively housed the same equipment as the EC-135, but offered more space and an ability to remain aloft longer than an EC-135.

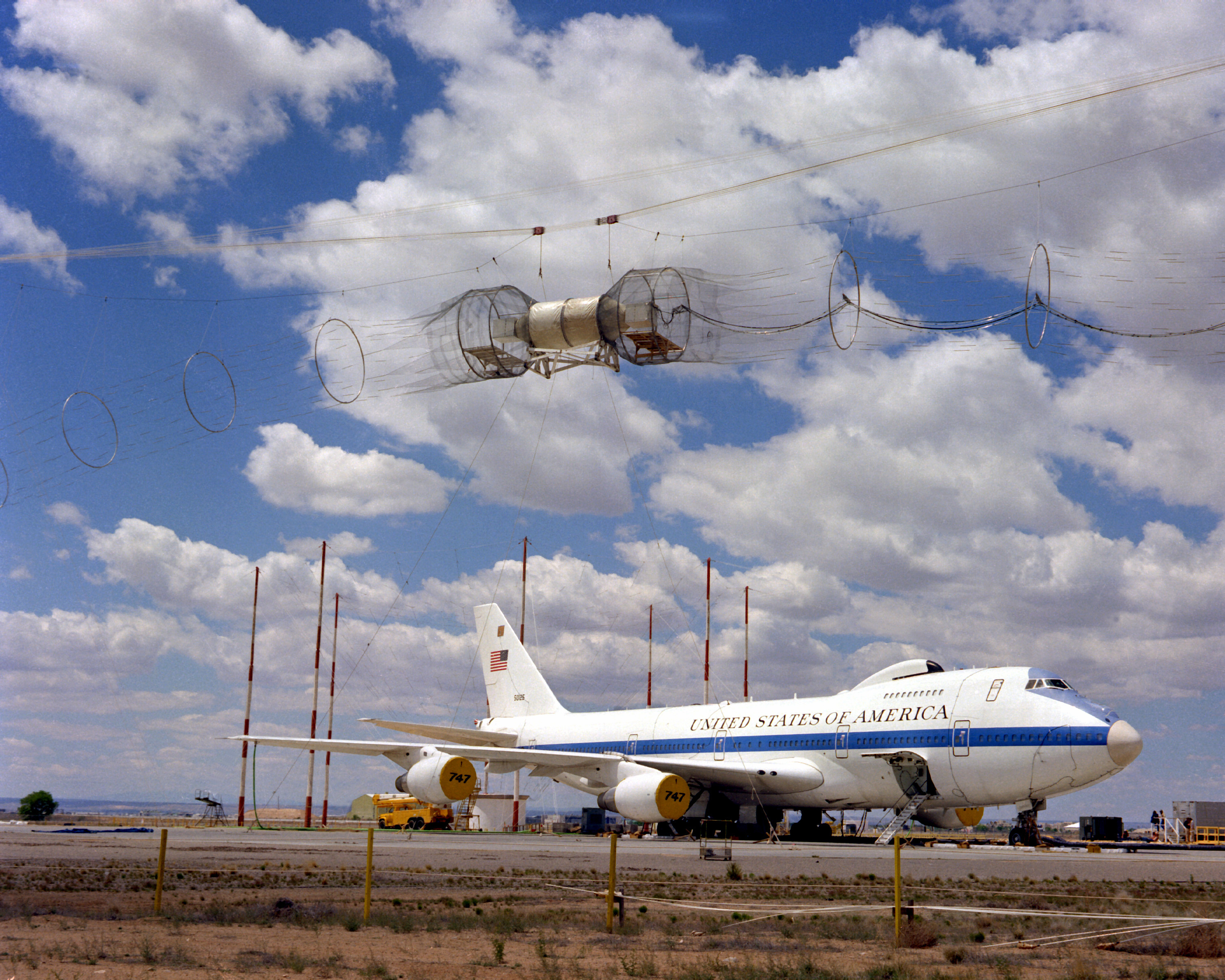
An E-4 advanced airborne command post (AABNCP) on the nuclear electromagnetic pulse (EMP) simulator for testing.

In December 1973, a fourth aircraft was ordered. It was fitted with more advanced equipment, resulting in the designation E-4B. On 21 December 1979, Boeing delivered the first E-4B, AF Serial Number 75-0125, which was distinguished from the earlier version by the presence of a large streamlined radome on the dorsal surface directly behind the upper deck. This contains the aircraft's SHF satellite antenna.

In November 1973, it was reported that the program cost was estimated to total $548 million, equivalent to $3.97 billion in 2025 for a planned seven 747s, with six as operational command posts and one more for research and development. The final 3 aircraft were not built.

By January 1985, all three E-4As had been retrofitted to E-4B models. The E-4B offered a vast increase in communications capability over the previous model and was considered to be 'hardened' against the effects of a nuclear electromagnetic pulse (EMP) from a nuclear explosion. Hardening the aircraft meant that all equipment and wiring on board was shielded from an EMP.

In 2005, the Air Force awarded Boeing a five-year, US$2 billion contract, equivalent to $3.3 billion in 2025, for the continued upgrade of the E-4B fleet. In addition to the purchase and upgrade costs, the E-4 costs nearly $160,000 per hour, equivalent to $214,642 in 2025, for the Air Force to operate. The E-4B fleet had an estimated unit cost of approximately US$223.2 million each in 2024.

== Design ==
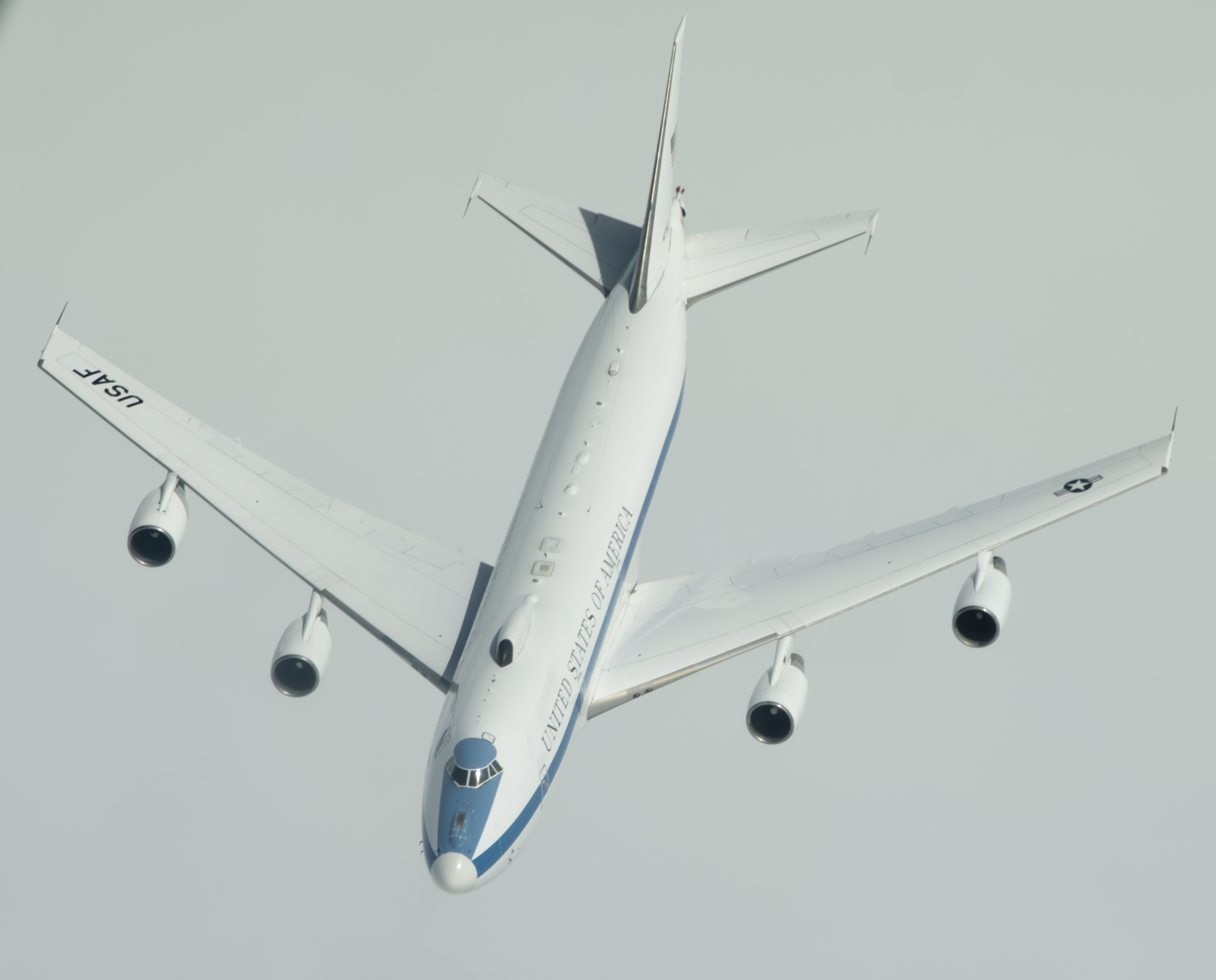
An E-4B approaching a KC-10 Extender of Travis AFB in preparation for aerial refueling

The E-4B is designed to survive an EMP with systems intact, and has state-of-the-art direct fire countermeasures. Many older aircraft have been upgraded with glass cockpits. The E-4B still uses traditional analog flight instruments, as they are less susceptible to damage from an EMP blast.

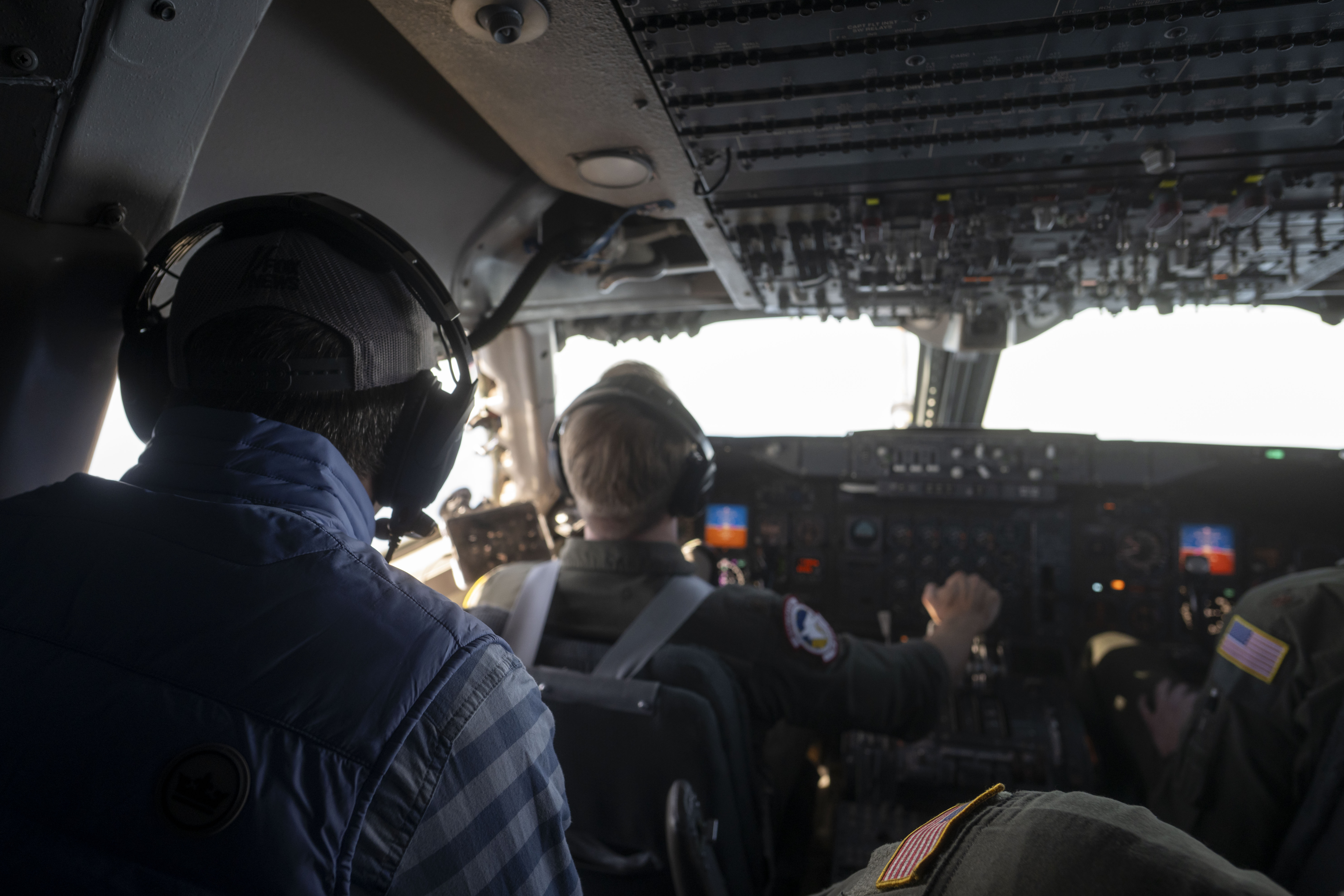
Secretary of Defense Pete Hegseth inside the cockpit of an E-4B

The E-4B is capable of operating with a crew up to 112 people, including flight and mission personnel, the largest crew of any aircraft in US Air Force history. With in-flight aerial refueling it is capable of remaining airborne for a considerable period, limited only by consumption of the engines' lubricants. In a test flight for endurance, the aircraft remained airborne and fully operational for 35.4 hours. It is designed to be able to remain airborne for a full week in the event of an emergency. It takes two fully loaded KC-135 tankers to fully refuel an E-4B. The E-4B has three operational decks: upper, middle, and lower.

=== Middle deck ===
The middle deck contains the conference room, which provides a secure area for conferences and briefings. It contains a conference table for nine people. Aft of the conference room is a projection room serving the conference room and the briefing room. The projection room had the capability of projecting computer graphics, overhead transparencies, or 35 mm slides to the conference room and/or the briefing room, and has since been modernized with flat screen displays.

The battle staff includes various controllers, planners, launch system officers, communications operators, a weather officer, administrative and support personnel, and a chief of battle staff. The Operation Looking Glass missions were commanded by a general officer with two staff officers. The National Airborne Operations Center (NAOC) may rendezvous and embark a member of the National Command Authority (NCA) from an undisclosed location. There are at least 48 crew aboard any E-4B mission.

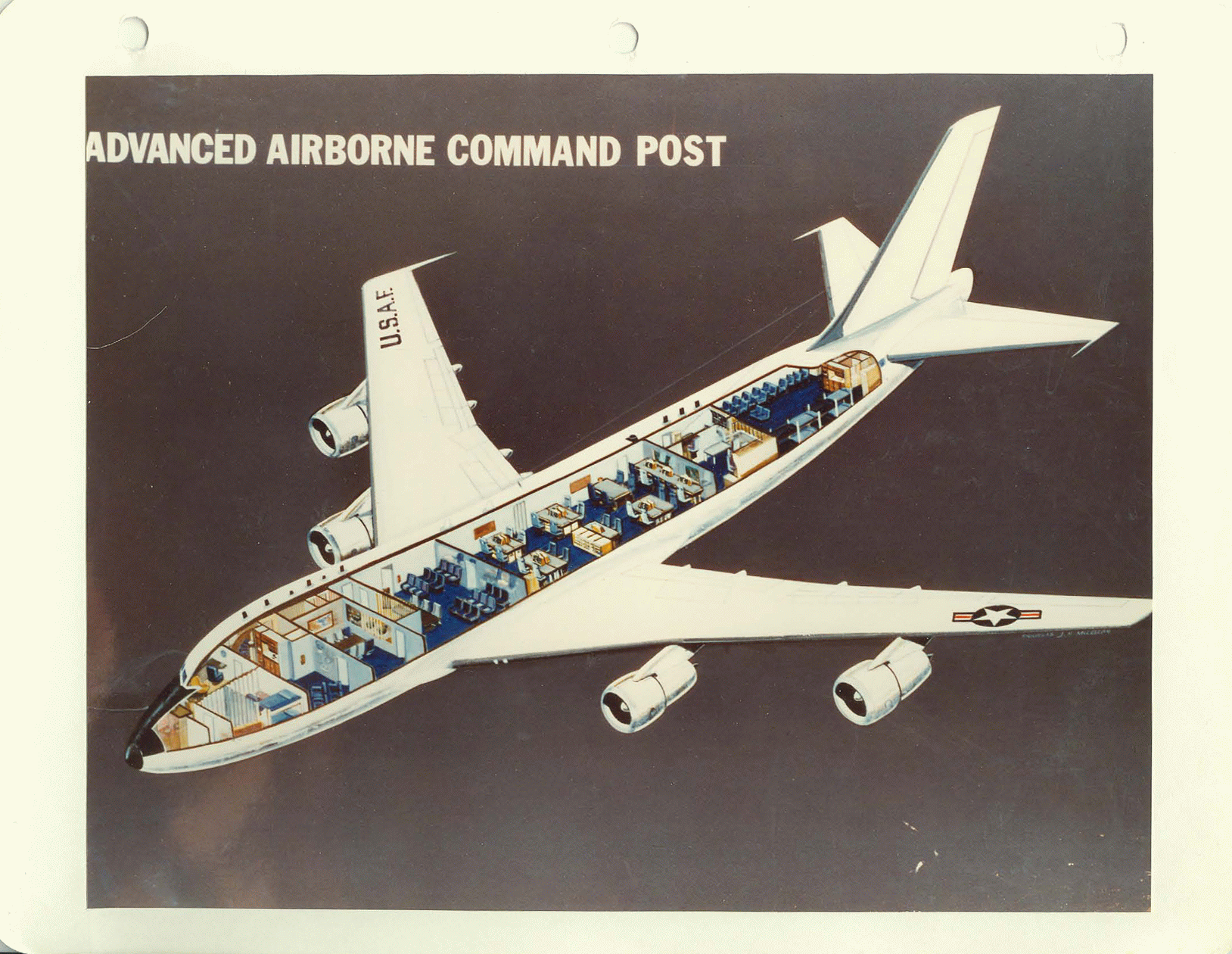
National Emergency Airborne Command Post internal configuration, April 1976

Behind the briefing room is the operations team area, containing the automatic data processing equipment and seats and console work areas for 29 staff members. The consoles are configured to provide access to or from the automated data processing, automatic switchboard, direct access telephone and radio circuits, direct ("hot") lines, monitor panel for switchboard lines, staff, and operator inter-phone and audio recorder.

The aft compartment at the end of the main deck is the Technical Control (Tech Control) area. This area was the nerve center for all communications and communications technicians. Typically three of the six crew positions were occupied here by specialized US Air Force technicians that were responsible for the proper monitoring and distribution of all communications power, cooling, and reliability.

The Technical Controller No. 1 (Tech 1, TC1) was the direct interface with the aircraft Flight Engineer and Flight Crew. This position was also the main focal point for all communications related issues. The Technical Controller No. 2 (Tech 2, TC2) was responsible for maintaining all UHF communications between the aircraft and the Nightwatch GEP (Ground Entry Points). These GEP's provided 12 voice lines to the aircraft which were used in the day-to-day operations of the mission. Secure Voice was provided. The SHF Operator (or technician) maintained the SHF satellite link and provided other worldwide communications services, probably having replaced a lot of the UHF capabilities.

The rest area, which occupies the remaining portion of the aft main deck, provides a rest and sleeping area for the crew members. The rest area contains storage for food and is used for religious ceremonies.

Within the forward entry area is the main galley unit and stairways to the flight deck and to the forward lower equipment area. This area contains refrigerators, freezers, two convection ovens, and a microwave oven to give stewards the capability to provide more than 100 hot meals during prolonged missions. Four seats are located on the left side of the forward entry area for the secret service and the stewards.

Behind the forward entry area, is the National Command Authority (NCA) area, which is designed and furnished as an executive suite. It contains an office, a lounge, a sleeping area, and a dressing room. Telephone instruments in this area provide the NCA with secure and clear worldwide communications.

The briefing room contains a briefing table with three executive seats, 18 additional seats, a lectern, and two 80-inch flat screen LED monitors flush mounted to the partition.

The communications control area is divided into a voice area and a data area. The voice area, located on the right side of the compartment, contains the radio operator's console, the semi-automatic switchboard console, and the communication officer's console. The data area, located on the left side of the area, contains the record communications console, record data supervisor's console, high speed DATA/AUTODIN/AFSAT console, and LF/VLF control heads.

=== Lower deck ===
The forward lower equipment room contains the aircraft's water supply tanks, 1200 kVA electrical power panels, step-down transformers, VLF transmitter, and SHF SATCOM equipment. An AC/DC powered hydraulic retractable airstair is located in the forward right side of the forward lower equipment area, installed for airplane entry and exit. In the event of an emergency, the airstair can be jettisoned. The aft lower lobe contains the maintenance console and mission specific equipment.

The lower trailing wire antenna (TWA) area contains the aircraft's 5-mile-long (8.0 km) TWA reel—which is used by up to 13 communications links—the antenna operator's station, as well as the antenna reel controls and indicators. Much attention has been given to hardening this area against EMP, especially as the TWA, essential for communicating with Ohio-class ballistic missile submarines, is particularly effective in picking up EMP.

The flight avionics area contains the aircraft systems power panels, flight avionics equipment, liquid oxygen converters, and storage for baggage and spare parts.

== Operational history ==
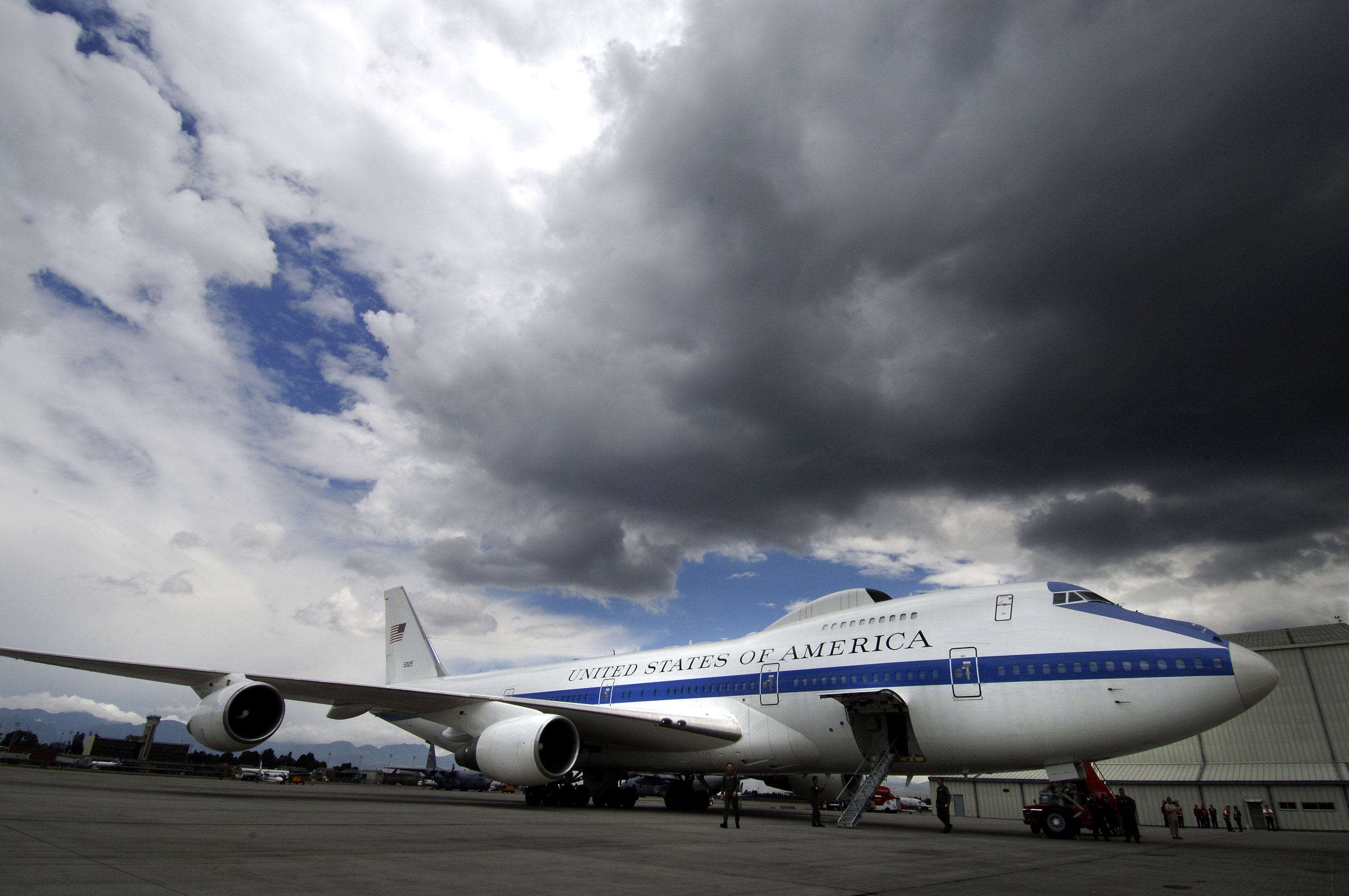
An E-4 at El Dorado International Airport in Bogotá, Colombia

The E-4 fleet was originally deployed in 1974, when it was termed National Emergency Airborne Command Post (NEACP), often pronounced "kneecap". The aircraft was to provide a survivable platform to conduct war operations in the event of a nuclear attack. Early in the E-4's service, the media dubbed the aircraft as "the doomsday planes". The E-4 was also capable of operating the "Looking Glass" missions of the Strategic Air Command (SAC).

The aircraft were originally stationed at Andrews Air Force Base, Maryland, so that the U.S. president and secretary of defense could access them quickly in the event of an emergency. The name "Nightwatch" originates from the richly detailed Rembrandt painting, The Night Watch, that depicts local townsfolk protecting a town. It was selected by the Squadron's first commanding officer. Later, the aircraft were moved to Offutt Air Force Base where they would be safer from attack. Until 1994, one E-4B was stationed at Andrews Air Force Base at all times so the president could easily board it in times of world crisis.

The NEACP aircraft originally used the static call sign "Silver Dollar". This call sign faded from use when daily call signs were put in use. The E-4B serves as the secretary of defense's preferred means of transportation when traveling outside the U.S. The spacious interior and sophisticated communications capability provided by the aircraft allow the Secretary's senior staff to work for the duration of the mission.

With the adoption of two highly modified Boeing 747-200Bs, Air Force designation VC-25A, to serve as Air Force One in 1989, and the end of the Cold War, the need for NEACP diminished. In 1994, NEACP began to be known as NAOC, and it took on a new responsibility: ferrying Federal Emergency Management Agency (FEMA) crews to natural disaster sites and serving as a temporary command post on the ground, until facilities could be built on site. No E-4B was employed during the Hurricane Katrina disaster of 2005, though one E-4B was used by FEMA following Hurricane Opal in 1995.

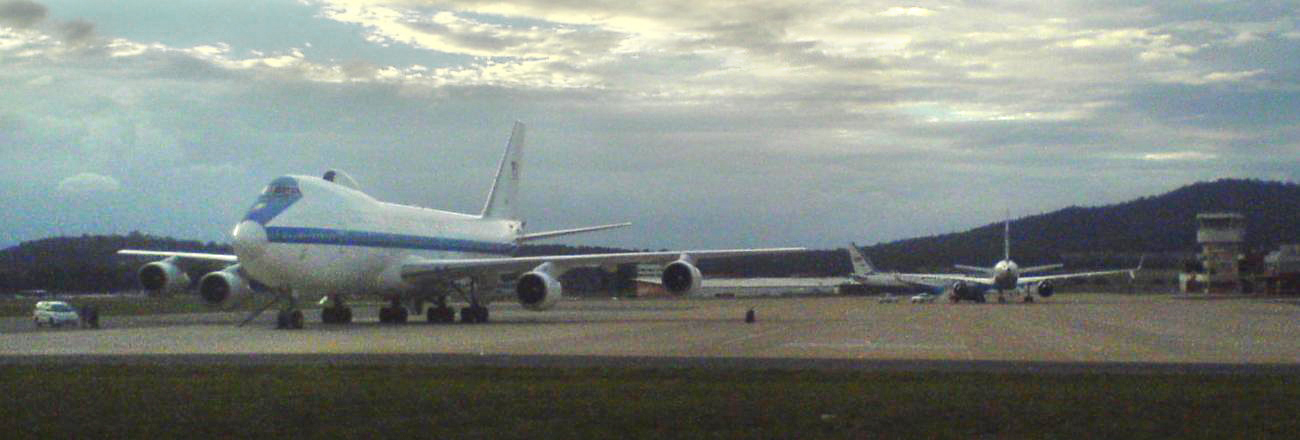
An E-4B and two C-32s at Defence Establishment Fairbairn, Canberra, Australia during bilateral defense talks, February 2008

One E-4B is kept on alert at all times. The "cocked" or "on alert" E-4B is crewed 24 hours a day with the watch crew on board guarding all communications systems awaiting a launch order (klaxon launch). Those crew members not on watch would be in the alert barracks, gymnasium, or at other base facilities. The 24-hour alert status at Andrews AFB ended when President Clinton ordered the aircraft to remain at Offutt unless needed. Relief crews remain based at Andrews and Wright-Patterson Air Force Base.

=== September 2001 to present ===
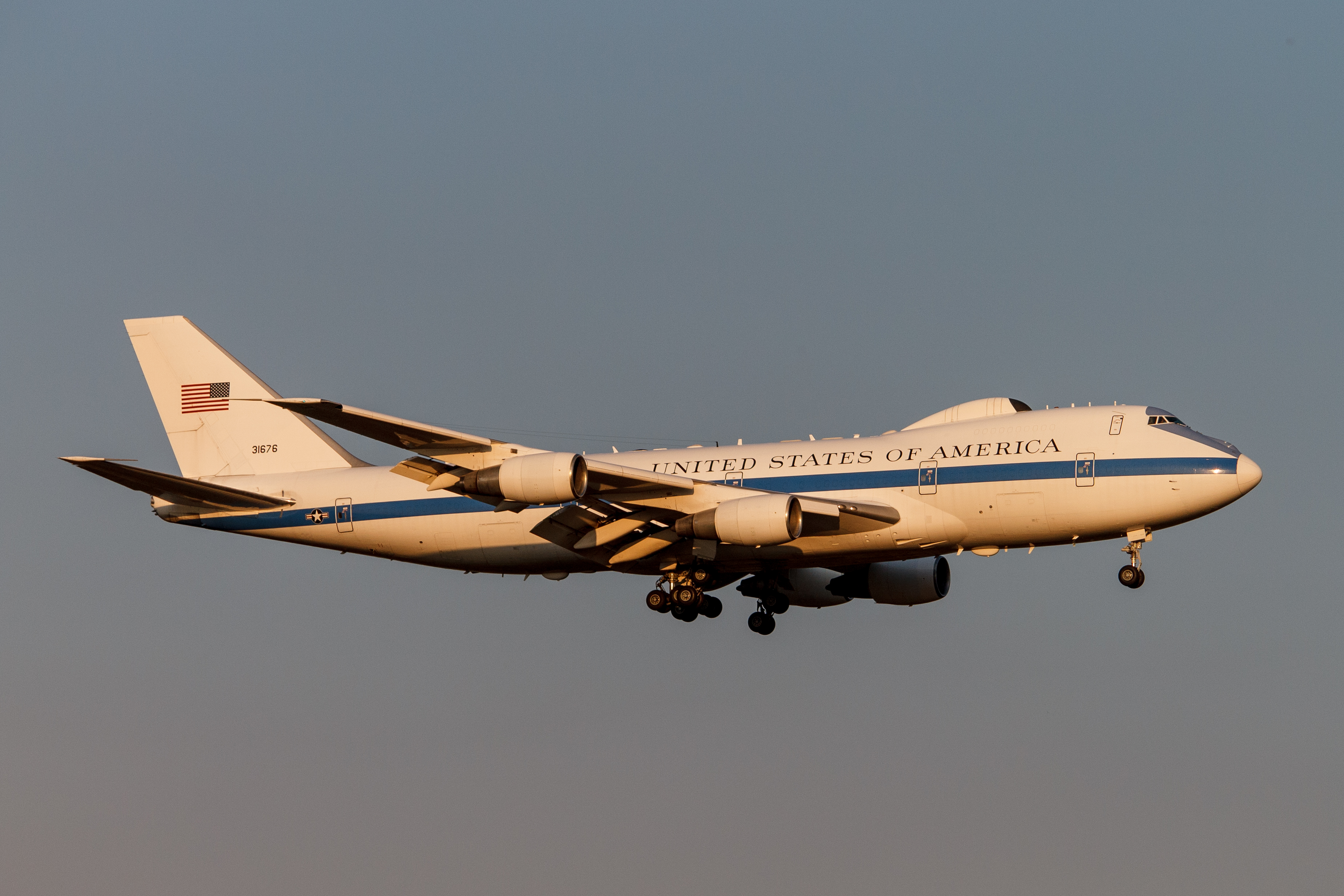
An E-4 on landing approach at Tinker AFB

On 11 September 2001, an aircraft closely resembling an E-4B was spotted and filmed circling the Washington, D.C. area by news outlets and civilians, after the attack on the Pentagon. In his book Black Ice, Dan Verton identifies this aircraft as an E-4B taking part in an operational exercise, and the exercise was canceled when the first plane struck the World Trade Center.

Air traffic control recordings and radar data indicate this E-4B call sign VENUS77 became airborne just before 9:44 am, circled north of the White House during its climb, and then tracked to the south of Washington, D.C., where it entered a holding pattern. In 2008, Brent Scowcroft explained that he was on this plane to go on an inspection tour to one unspecified nuclear weapons site, as chairman of a DoD team called "End to End review".

In January 2006, Secretary of Defense Donald Rumsfeld announced a plan to retire the entire E-4B fleet starting in 2009. This was reduced to retiring one of the aircraft in February 2007. Rumsfeld's successor, Robert Gates, reversed this decision in May 2007.

In the 2015 federal budget there were no plans for retiring the E-4B. The E-4B airframe has a usable life of 115,000 hours and 30,000 cycles, which would be reached in 2039. The maintenance limiting point would occur sometime in the 2020s.

All four produced are operated by the U.S. Air Force, and are assigned to the 1st Airborne Command Control Squadron (1ACCS), of the 595th Command and Control Group at Offutt Air Force Base, Nebraska. Operations are coordinated by the United States Strategic Command.

When the president travels outside of North America using a VC-25A as Air Force One, an E-4B will deploy to a second airport in the vicinity of the president's destination, to be readily available in the event of a world crisis or an emergency that renders the VC-25A unusable. When President Barack Obama visited Honolulu, Hawaii, an E-4B was often stationed 200 miles (322 km) away at Hilo International Airport on Hawaii Island.

In June 2017, two of the aircraft were damaged by a tornado that struck Offutt AFB, hit by falling debris after the tornado damaged the hangar the aircraft were stationed in. They were out of service for 11 weeks while repairs took place. The E-4B aircraft have been based at the nearby Lincoln Air National Guard Base three times: in 2006, in 2019 during the Missouri flood, and 2021–22 subsequent runway replacement.

=== Replacement ===
In 2021 and 2022, the U.S. Air Force began developing a replacement for the E-4. The new platform is currently known as the Survivable Airborne Operations Center. This aircraft is to be developed by Sierra Nevada Corporation collaborating with Rolls Royce, based on the Boeing 747-8I.

== Operators ==
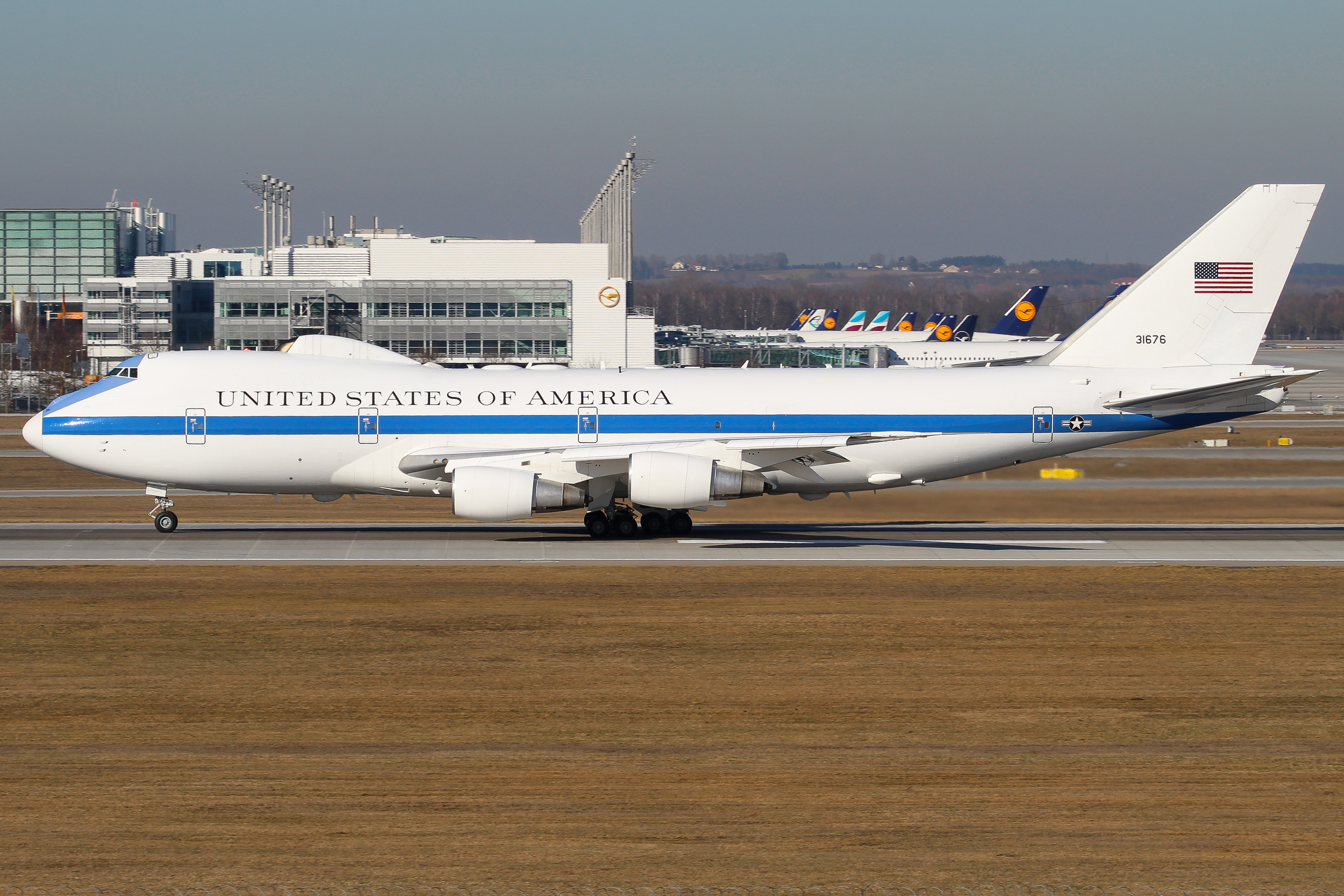
An E-4B during takeoff

United States

- United States Air Force – Global Strike Command
  - 595th Command and Control Group – Offutt AFB, Nebraska
    - 1st Airborne Command and Control Squadron

== Variants ==
E-4A
Three aircraft produced (s/n 73-1676, 73-1677, and 74-0787), powered by Pratt & Whitney JT9D-7A (first two aircraft) or General Electric CF6-50E2 (third aircraft) turbofan engines. No bulge to house equipment on top of fuselage. These were later converted to E-4Bs.
E-4B
One built (s/n 75-0125) and equipped with 52,500 lbf (234 kN) CF6-50E2 engines. Has nuclear EMP protection, nuclear and thermal effects shielding, advanced electronics, and a wide variety of communications equipment.
E-4C
Five Boeing 747-8I airliners purchased from Korean Air for conversion into replacement platforms for existing NAOC aircraft.

== Specifications (E-4B) ==
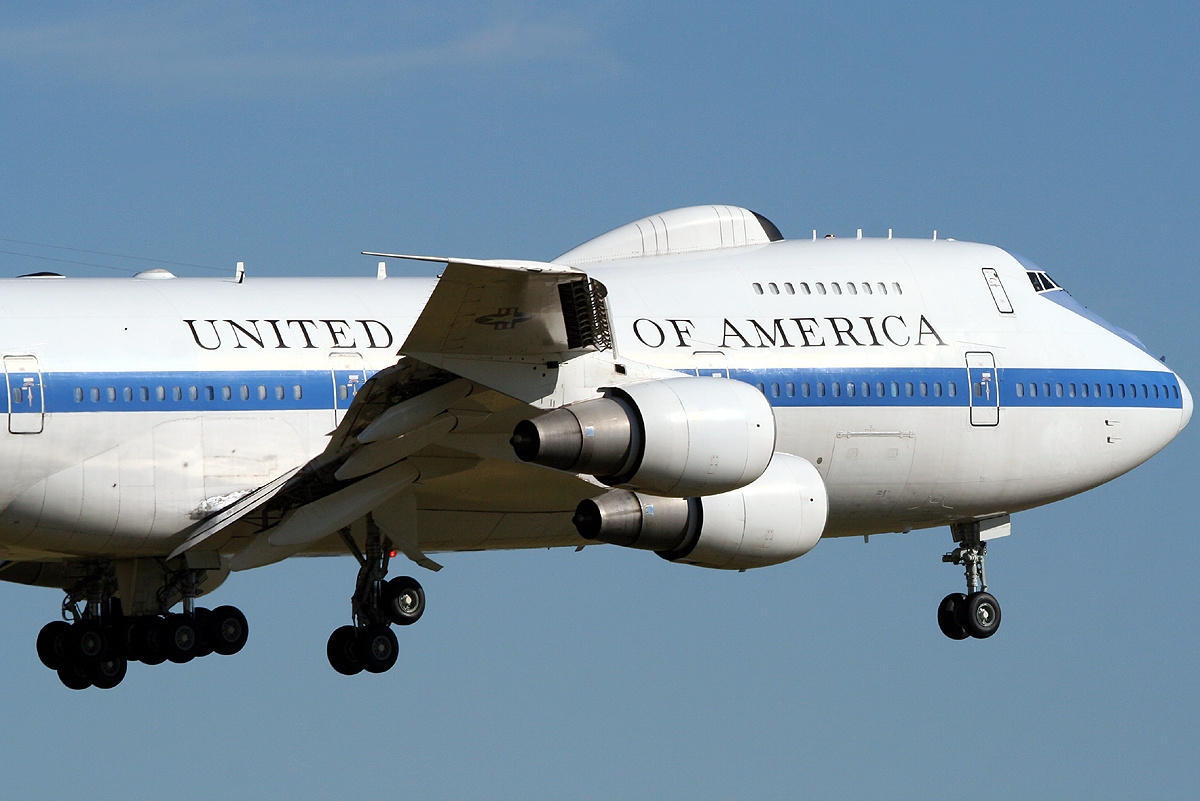
Boeing E-4B at Adelaide Airport

Data from USAF Fact Sheet, Boeing 747-200 specifications

General characteristics

- Crew: 4
- Capacity: up to 111 mission crew
- Length: 231 ft 4 in (70.51 m)
- Wingspan: 195 ft 8 in (59.64 m)
- Height: 63 ft 5 in (19.33 m)
- Wing area: 5,500 sq ft (510 m^{2})
- Airfoil: root: BAC 463 to BAC 468; tip: BAC 469 to BAC 474
- Empty weight: 410,000 lb (185,973 kg)
- Gross weight: 800,000 lb (362,874 kg)
- Max takeoff weight: 833,000 lb (377,842 kg)
- Powerplant: 4 × General Electric F103 turbofan engines, 52,500 lbf (234 kN) thrust each

(General Electric CF6-50E2)

Performance

- Maximum speed: 523 kn (602 mph, 969 km/h)
- Cruise speed: 483 kn (556 mph, 895 km/h) / M0.84
- Range: 6,200 nmi (7,100 mi, 11,500 km)
- Endurance: 150+ hours (with refueling)

12 hours (without refueling)

- Service ceiling: 45,000 ft (14,000 m)
- Wing loading: 150 lb/sq ft (730 kg/m^{2})
- Thrust/weight: 0.26

== Notable appearances in media ==
The E-4B plays a prominent role in two motion pictures. In the 1990 HBO film By Dawn's Early Light, following a nuclear strike by the Soviets, the aircraft serves as a flying platform for the presumed president, the ex–secretary of the interior, who is played by Darren McGavin. The aircraft is pursued by a Boeing EC-135 "Looking Glass", which successfully intercepts it.

In the 2002 motion picture The Sum of All Fears, the president and his staff travel on an E-4B, following the detonation of a nuclear weapon by terrorists. In the novel, the vice president and his family are aboard the NEACP after terrorists detonate a nuclear bomb in Denver, while the president and his National Security Advisor are stuck at Camp David during a blinding snowstorm.

National Geographic produced a television special on doomsday planning of the U.S., which includes footage from inside an E-4B during a drill.

== See also ==
- TACAMO – US strategic communications system
- Airborne Launch Control System – US Strategic Command platform

Related development

- Boeing 747 – American wide-body four-engined jet long-range aircraft
- Boeing VC-25 – US Air Force presidential transport aircraft

Aircraft of comparable role, configuration, and era

- Boeing E-6 Mercury – Airborne command post aircraft by Boeing based on 707 airframe
- Doomsday plane (Russia) – Russian Airborne Command Post
- Ilyushin Il-80 – Russian airborne command post aircraft based on Il-86 airliner
- Northrop Grumman E-10 MC2A – Proposed Airborne Warning and Control aircraft based on the Boeing 767 airframe

Related lists

- List of active United States military aircraft

== Bibliography ==
- Bowers, Peter M. (1989). Boeing Aircraft since 1916. London: Putnam. ISBN 0-870-21037-8.
- Francillon, René J. (December 2008). "Doomsday 747s: The National Airborne Operations Center". Air International. Stamford, Lincolnshire, UK: Key Publishing. pp. 32–37.
- Haverlah, Jeff (2005). "Nightwatch Outline" (PDF). Worldwide Ute News Club (WUN).
- Jenkins, Dennis R. (2000). "AirlinerTech Series, Volume 6". Boeing 747-100/200/300/SP. North Branch, MN: Specialty Press Publishers. ISBN 1-580-07026-4.
- Lloyd, Alwyn T. (2000). A Cold War Legacy: A Tribute to Strategic Air Command- 1946–1992. Missoula, Montana, United States: Pictorial Histories Publications Company. ISBN 978-1-575-10052-4.
- Michell, Simon (1994). Jane's Civil and Military Upgrades 1995–96. Coulsden, Surrey, UK: Jane's Information Group. ISBN 0-710-61208-7.
- Tyler, Tim (1995). "Who are the Nightwatch stations?" (PDF). Special Topic Report. Worldwide Ute News Club (WUN).
- Verton, Dan (2003). Black Ice: The Invisible Threat of Cyber-Terrorism. New York: McGraw-Hill/Osborne. ISBN 978-0-072-22787-1.
