= ACCS =

ACCS may refer to:

- Adarsh Credit Cooperative Society, an Indian credit society
- Air Command and Control System, a NATO project to replace outdated technology
- Ancient Christian Commentary on Scripture
- Anti-Corruption Commission Seychelles, a government agency in Seychelles
- Association of Classical and Christian Schools, an organization that encourages the formation of Christian schools using a model of classical education

== See also ==
- List of United States Air Force airborne command and control squadrons for Airborne Command and Control Squadron
- American Association of Christian Colleges and Seminaries for American Christian College and Seminary, any school that is part of the association
