= EC135 =

EC135, EC-135, or EC 135 may be:

- Boeing EC-135, a cargo airplane used for several U.S. Air Force missions.
- Eurocopter EC135, twin-engine civil helicopter
