= List of United States Air Force airborne command and control squadrons =

This article lists airborne command and control squadrons of the United States Air Force.

== Airborne command and control squadrons ==
Squadron	Patch	Location	Nickname	Airframe	Note
1st Airborne Command and Control Squadron		Offutt AFB	Silver Dollar Nightwatch	EC-135J E-4B	NEACP (Knee Cap)- National Emergency Airborne Command Post NAOC - National Airborne Operations Center
2nd Airborne Command and Control Squadron		Offutt AFB	Looking Glass EASTAUX	EC-135C	SAC Airborne Command Post - Inactive
3rd Airborne Command and Control Squadron		Grissom AFB		EC-135C	SAC command post - Inactive
4th Airborne Command and Control Squadron		Ellsworth AFB	ALCC WESTAUX	EC-135A/C/G/L	Airborne Launch Control System - Inactive
5th Airborne Command and Control Squadron					Never activated
6th Airborne Command and Control Squadron		Langley AFB	Scope Light	EC-135H/P	LANTCOM Airborne Command Post - Inactive
7th Expeditionary Airborne Command and Control Squadron		Al Udeid AB		EC-130E/H; EC-135C; E-8C	
8th Airborne Command and Control Squadron		Tinker AFB		EC-135K	Redesignated 8th Weapons Squadron - Non-flying
9th Airborne Command and Control Squadron		Hickam AFB	Blue Eagle	EC-135P/J	PACOM Airborne Command Post - Inactive
10th Airborne Command and Control Squadron		RAF Mildenhall	SILK PURSE ("Seabell")	EC-135H	EUCOM Airborne Command Post - Inactive
11th Airborne Command and Control Squadron					Never activated
12th Airborne Command and Control Squadron		Robins AFB	"Dragons"	E-8 JSTARS	Inactive
16th Airborne Command and Control Squadron		Robins AFB	"Phoenix Warriors"	E-8 JSTARS	Inactive
18th Airborne Command and Control Squadron		Robins AFB		E-11A BACN	Active
42nd Airborne Command and Control Squadron		Davis-Monthan AFB		EC-130	Inactive
128th Airborne Command and Control Squadron		Robins AFB	"Alley Cats"	E-8 JSTARS	
1000th Airborne Command and Control Squadron		Andrews AFB	Nightwatch	EC-135J	NEACP (Knee Cap)- National Emergency Airborne Command Post - Inactive Replaced by 1st ACCS
6486th Airborne Command and Control Squadron		Hickam AFB	Blue Eagle	EC-135P	PACOM Airborne Command Post - Inactive Replaced by 9th ACCS
7120th Airborne Command and Control Squadron		Châteauroux-Déols Air Base, France	Silk Purse	EC-118G	EUCOM Airborne Command Post - Inactive Replaced by 10th ACCS

== See also ==
- List of United States Air Force squadrons
