= 452nd Flight Test Squadron =

US Air Force unit

452nd Flight Test Squadron

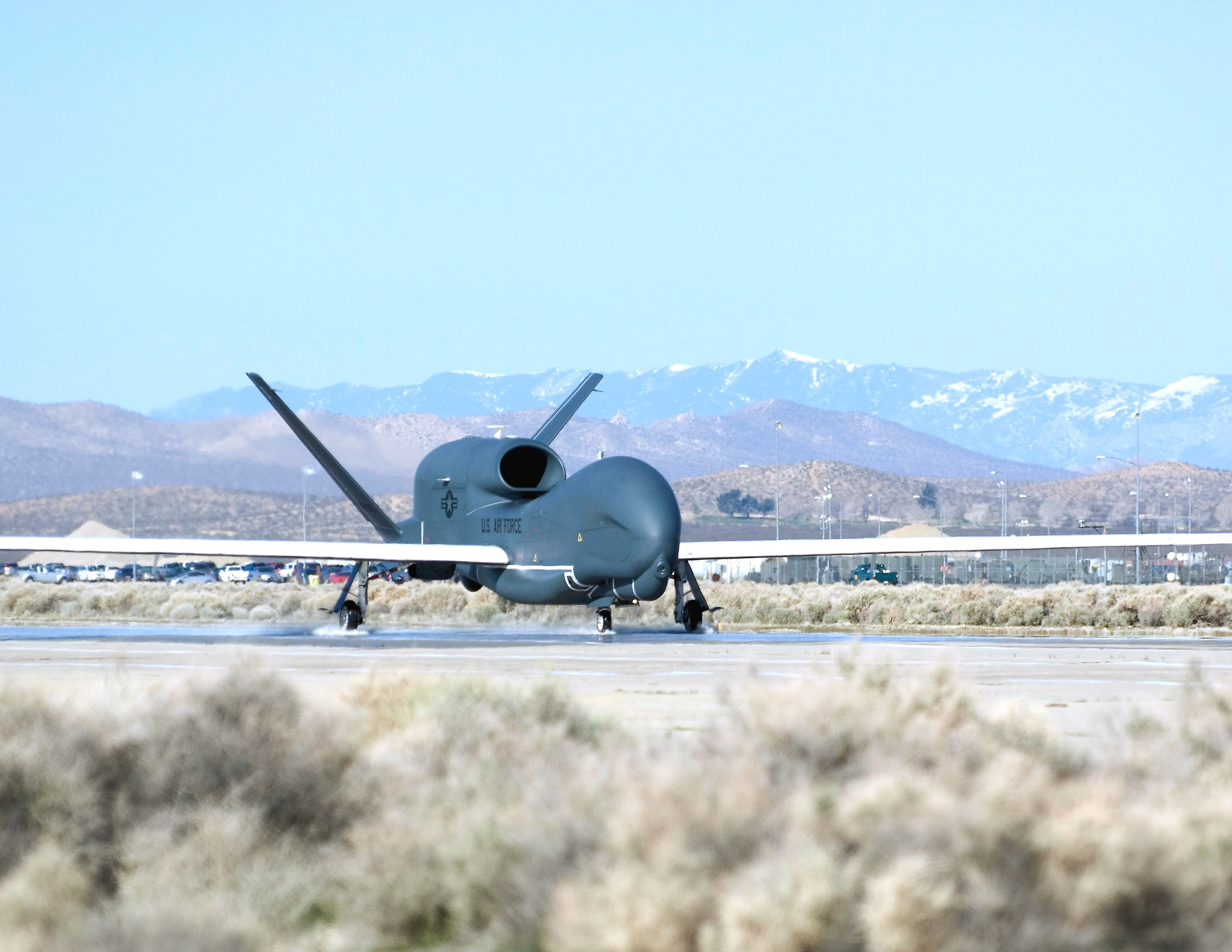
- 452nd Flight Test Squadron RQ-4B Global Hawk
- Active: 1942–1945; 1947–1949; 1954–1957; 1972–1993; 1993–present
- Country: United States
- Branch: United States Air Force
- Type: Squadron
- Role: Flight testing
- Part of: Air Force Materiel Command
- Garrison/HQ: Edwards Air Force Base, California
- Engagements: European Theater of Operations
- Decorations: Distinguished Unit Citation; Air Force Outstanding Unit Award

Insignia
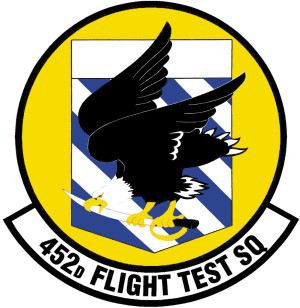
- 452d Flight Test Squadron emblem (Note: Approved 30 May 1993.)

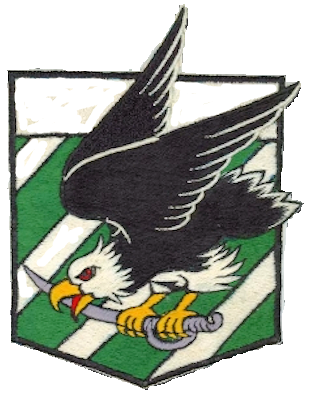
- 452d Fighter-Day Squadron emblem (Note: Approved 22 July 1955. Description: On a shield vert, four scarpes and a chief argent, all fimbriated sable, over all a falcon proper (black head, tail feathers, talons and markings white, beak and feet yellow, eye red) grasping with his feet, a saber, blade of the second [color mentioned), grip of the third [color mentioned], hilt or all outlined sable.)

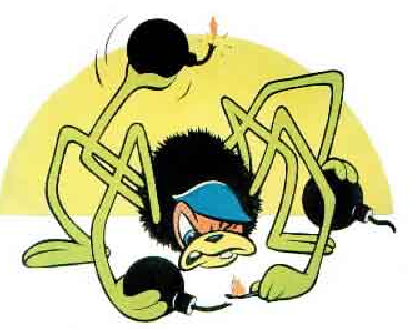
- 452d Bombardment Squadron emblem (Note: Approved 12 July 1943.)
- World War II fuselage code: DR
- Tail Code, 1993–2010; 2017–present: ED

Aircraft flown
- Reconnaissance: RQ-4B Global Hawk

The 452nd Flight Test Squadron is an active United States Air Force squadron. It is assigned to the 412th Operations Group of Air Force Materiel Command, stationed at Edwards Air Force Base, California, where it performs flight testing on unmanned aerial vehicles. The squadron was first activated as the 452nd Bombardment Squadron in July 1942. After training in the United States, it deployed to the European Theater of Operations (ETO) in December 1942. It engaged in combat operations from 1943 to 1945, earning a Distinguished Unit Citation for demonstrating the effectiveness of medium bombers in the ETO. Following V-E Day, it participated in the disarmament of the Luftwaffe until September 1945, when it returned to the United States for inactivation.

The squadron served in the reserves from August 1947 to June 1949, when it was inactivated when Continental Air Command reorganized its flying units, although it does not appear to have been fully manned or equipped with operational aircraft at this time.

The squadron was activated in July 1954 as the 452nd Fighter-Day Squadron and equipped with North American F-86 Sabre fighters. Although it soon upgraded to the supersonic North American F-100 Super Sabre it was inactivated in November 1957, when Tactical Air Command reduced the number of fighter groups at Foster Air Force Base from two to one.

In 1973, Air Training Command was converting its flying training units from MAJCON status. As part of this reorganization, the squadron was redesignated the 452nd Flying Training Squadron and replaced the 3539th Navigator Training Squadron at Mather Air Force Base, California. It conducted flight training for members of the United States military and foreign allies until inactivating in May 1993 as Mather prepared for closure.

The squadron was activated in November 1993 as the 452nd Test Squadron it performed tests with large transport aircraft until inactivating in June 2010. It was activated again in March 2017 in its current role.

== Mission ==
The squadron is the test force for the Global Vigilance Task Force. Prior to June 2023, the squadron performed flight testing on Northrop Grumman RQ-4 Global Hawk unmanned aerial vehicles (UAV) used by the United States Air Force, NATO, Republic of Korea Air Force, and Japan Air Self-Defense Force.

== History ==
=== World War II ===
==== Initial organization and training ====
The squadron was first activated at MacDill Field, Florida on 17 July 1942 as the 452nd Bombardment Squadron, one of the four original squadrons of the 322nd Bombardment Group. However, it did not receive its initial cadre until 7 August. It was equipped with Martin B-26 Marauders and trained with them at MacDill and at Drane Field, Florida. The ground echelon of the squadron departed for the Port of Embarkation in November and sailed for the United Kingdom aboard the RMS Queen Elizabeth on 24 November, arriving in the United Kingdom six days later. The air echelon continued training in Florida until it began to ferry its Marauders from Morrison Field to Europe via the South Atlantic ferry route as new aircraft became available. The 452nd was the second squadron of the group to leave the United States, departing in March 1943.

==== Combat in the European Theater ====
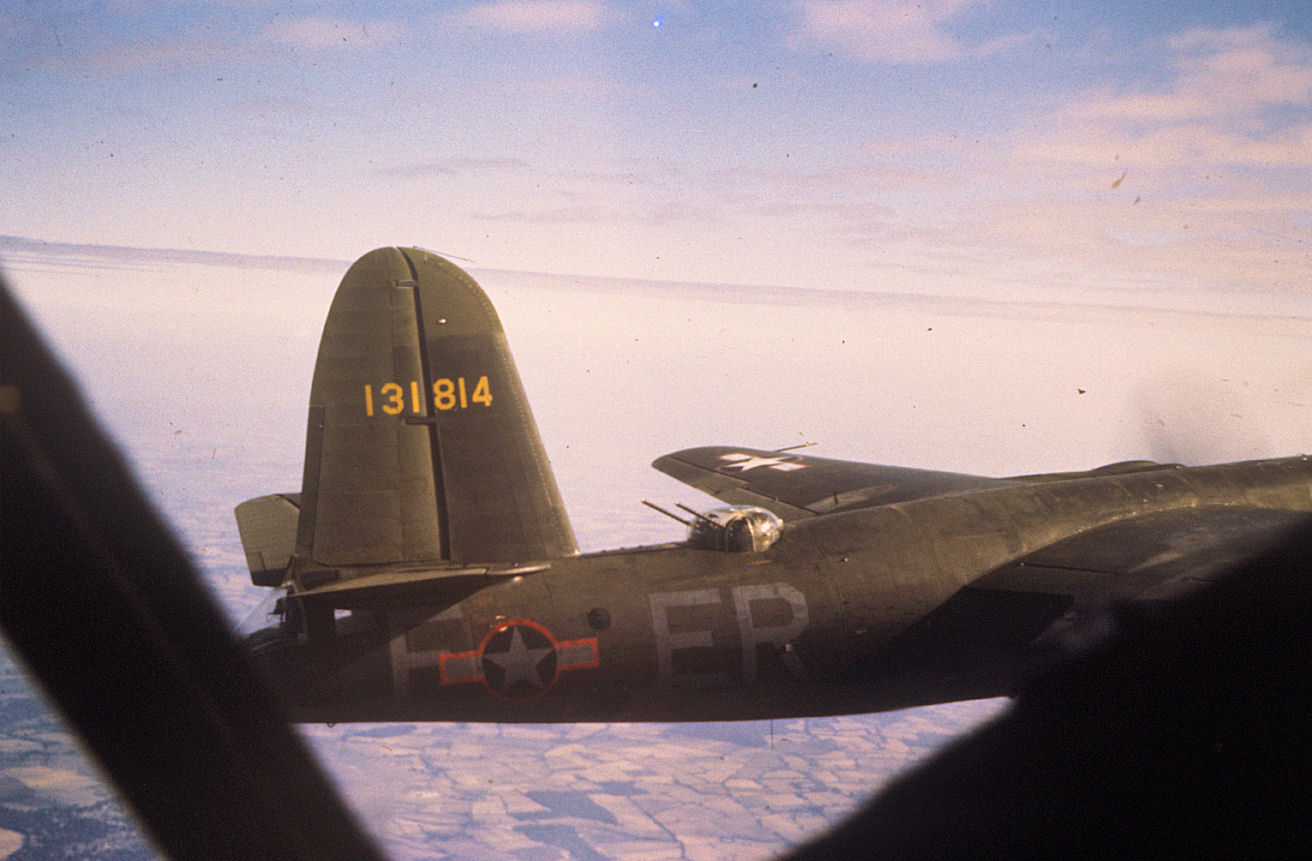
Squadron B-26 Marauder (Note: Airplane is Martin B-26B-25-MA Marauder, serial 41-31814, ER-F Bag of Bolts in flight over England. This plane was shot down on 8 July 1944 by a Messerschmitt Bf 110G-4 flown by Maj Wolfgang Himming of Stab/Nachtjagdgeschwader 4 (Headquarters, Night Fighter Wing 4). One crewmember killed. Five bailed out, with three becoming prisoners of war and the other two evading capture. Missing Aircrew Report 6626.)

The ground echelon was established at RAF Rattlesden, its first combat station, on 1 December 1942. The 322nd Group flew its first mission, and the first B-26 Marauder mission in the European Theater of Operations, on 14 May against an electrical power plant near IJmuiden in the Netherlands using low level attack tactics. The planes of the 452nd suffered much of the heaviest damage on this attack, with the plane flown by Maj G. C. Celio, the squadron's commander, returning with over 300 holes from enemy fire. Three days later, the group dispatched eleven planes for a repeat low level attack on the IJmuiden power plant and another at Haarlem in the Netherlands. One plane returned early due to a mechanical malfunction. The remaining ten aircraft and their crews were lost to enemy action. For these actions and for demonstrating the effectiveness of medium bombers, the 322nd Group, including the squadron, was awarded the Distinguished Unit Citation. (Note: Following the raids, the 322nd was withdrawn from combat for training ln medium altitude bombing and equipping its planes for that tactic, returning to combat on 17 July.)

In June 1943, the squadron, along with all other B-26 units in England, moved to Essex, an area where it was planned to build up a tactical air force for the forthcoming invasion of Europe, with the 452nd arriving at RAF Great Saling on 12 June. Once the squadron reentered combat, enemy airfields were its principal targets through February 1944, but it also attacked power stations, shipyards, construction works, marshalling yards and other targets. In March 1944, its emphasis shifted to railway and highway bridges, and oil storage facilities in preparation for Operation Overlord, the invasion of Normandy. It also participated in Operation Crossbow, the attacks on V-1 flying bomb and V-2 rocket launch sites.

On D-Day, the squadron attacked coastal defenses and artillery batteries. It supported the Allies in the Battle for Caen and in Operation Cobra, the breakout at Saint Lo in July. Through August and September, it provided air support for the drive of United States Third Army across Northern France.

In late September, the squadron moved from England to Beauvais/Tille Airfield, France. It bombed bridges, road junctions, defended villages, and ordnance depots in the assault on the Siegfried Line from October through December 1944. During the Battle of the Bulge, it flew attacks on railroad bridges to cut German lines of communications. From then until it flew its last mission on 24 April 1945, it concentrated on communications, bridges, marshalling yards and fuel dumps.

Following V-E Day, the 452nd transferred its aircraft and flying personnel to other units. The remainder of the squadron personnel then moved to Wickenrode, (Note: Perhaps a typographical error for Wickenrodt. Both Wickenrodt and Hornel were in the French Zone of Occupation.) Germany, and later to Hornel as part of the military occupation force. It engaged in inventorying and disassembling Luftwaffe equipment until September 1945. In December it returned to the United States and was inactivated at the Port of Embarkation on 11 December 1945.

=== Reserve operations ===
The squadron was reactivated in the reserves on 9 August 1947 at Reading Army Air Field, Pennsylvania, where its training was supervised by the 438th AAF Base Unit (later the 2237 Air Force Reserve Training Center). It does not appear to have been fully manned and was equipped only with trainer aircraft. In July 1948 Continental Air Command (ConAC) assumed responsibility for managing reserve and Air National Guard units from ADC. In June 1949, ConAC reorganized its flying units under the Wing/Base organization and the 452nd was inactivated and its personnel were transferred to the 319th Bombardment Wing.

=== Fighter operations ===
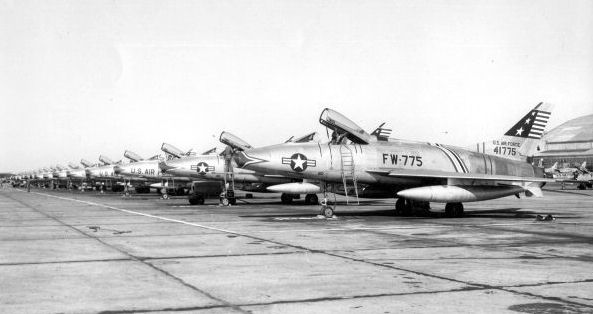
F-100s at Foster AFB in 1956 (Note: Aircraft in foreground is North American F-100C-5-NA Super Sabre, serial 54-1775. This plane was shot down in Southeast Asia on 2 August 1968. Baugher, Joe (24 July 2023). "1954 USAF Serial Numbers". Joe Baugher.)

The squadron was redesignated the 452nd Fighter-Day Squadron and activated at Foster Air Force Base, Texas as Tactical Air Command took over Foster from Air Training Command (ATC). It was initially equipped with North American F-86 Sabre fighters, but by 1955 was replacing them with supersonic North American F-100 Super Sabres. The squadron deployed its Super Sabres to Landstuhl Air Base, West Germany in September 1956. However, the Air Force decided to close Foster. In November 1957, the 450th Fighter-Day Wing reduced to a single group and the squadron was inactivated along with other elements of the 322nd Fighter-Day Group.

=== Flying training ===
==== Background ====
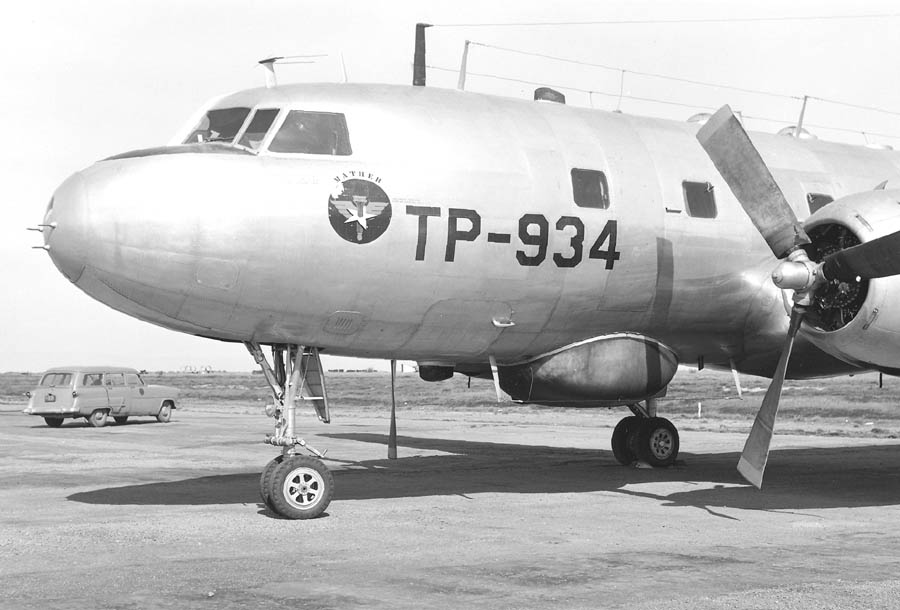
Convair T-29C from Mather AFB

The 3539th Navigator Training Squadron was established at Mather Air Force Base on 1 April 1965. The navigator training program at Mather expanded at this time when navigator training at James Connally Air Force Base ended and all navigator training was concentrated at Mather. A number of Convair T-29 Flying Classrooms equipped with special electronics were transferred from James Connally to Mather in connection with this change.

However, the 3539th was a Major Command controlled (MAJCON) unit, created by ATC. MAJCON units could not carry a permanent history or lineage. ATC received authority from Headquarters USAF to discontinue its MAJCON flying training wings and to activate Air Force controlled (AFCON) units, most of which were inactive at the time, which could carry a lineage and history in their place.

==== Navigator training ====
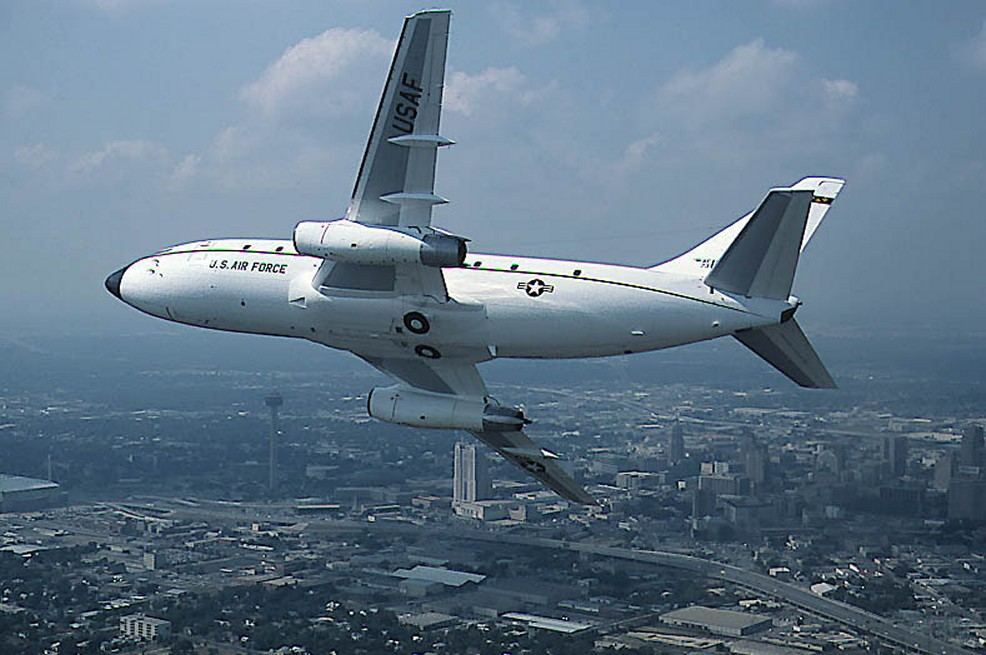
T-43 Bobcat as flown by the squadron

On 1 April 1973, the squadron was activated as the 452nd Flying Training Squadron. It absorbed the personnel, mission and resources of the 3539th Navigator Training Squadron which was simultaneously inactivated. In 1978, the first females began navigator training. It continued to conduct undergraduate navigator training for USAF, United States Navy, United States Marine Corps, and United States allies until 1993. In 1989, the base closure commission recommended that Mather be closed. The Air Force moved its navigator training to Randolph Air Force Base, Texas and the squadron was inactivated on 31 May 1993 as Mather drew down in preparing for closing on 1 October 1993.

=== Flight Testing ===
==== Advanced Range Instrumentation Aircraft ====
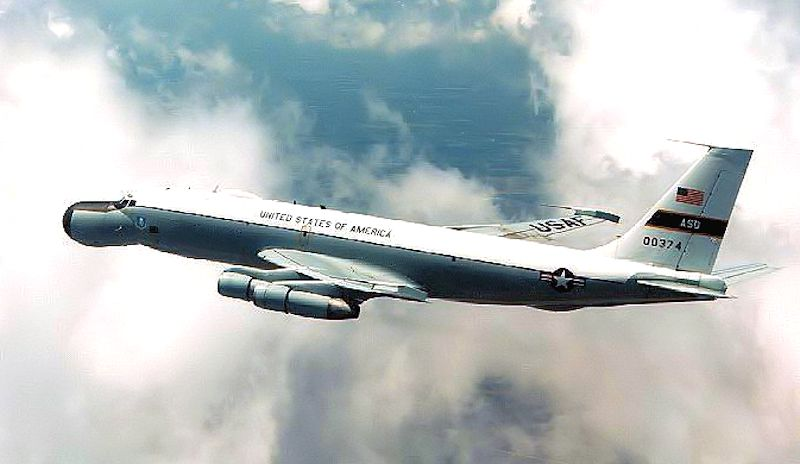
Squadron EC-135N Advanced Range Instrumentation Aircraft (Note: Aircraft is Boeing EC-135N, serial 60-0374, Bird of Prey. It was built as a Boeing C-135A-BN Stratolifter, and initially served with Military Air Transport Service. It was modified to EC-135N configuration in 1966. Flown on 3 Nov 2000 to the USAF Museum, at Wright Patterson AFB, OH, where it is on display. Baugher, Joe (3 October 2023). "1960 USAF Serial Numbers". Joe Baugher.)

Background

The 4952d Test Squadron was activated on 1 July 1975 at Wright-Patterson Air Force Base, Ohio to operate the Boeing EC-135N Advanced Range Instrumentation Aircraft (ARIA) (Note: Originally Apollo Range Instrumentation Aircraft.) when Air Force Systems Command consolidated all its large test and evaluation aircraft at one location. The EC-135 ARIA had been developed to meet NASA and Department of Defense requirements for a mobile telemetry relay and recording station to supplement fixed telemetry stations for the Apollo Program and ballistic missile reentry missions. In 1982, the Air Force purchased eight used Boeing 707s from American Airlines and converted them to the ARIA configuration as EC-18s. Although similar, the EC-18 is larger than the EC-135, and can carry a larger payload and operate from shorter fields. Two of the EC-18s were also capable of inflight refueling. The EC-135Ns were later re-engined and designated EC-135Es. Two EC-18s were equipped with high-speed still and motion picture cameras capable of infrared and spectral photography, which aids in determining vehicle survivability. The 4952nd moved to Edwards Air Force Base, California along with its parent 4950th Test Wing.

The 452nd squadron was redesignated the 452nd Test Squadron and reactivated in October 1993 at Edwards Air Force Base, when it assumed the personnel, mission and ARIA aircraft of the 4952d Test Squadron that was simultaneously inactivated. The 452nd also acquired the Boeing KC-135 Stratotanker and Boeing NKC-135 aircraft and their test missions. These planes were used for air refueling certification of test aircraft and such projects as aircraft icing tests.

ARIA operations

The ARIA aircraft completed their move to Edwards in 1994. They deployed throughout the world to obtain telemetry data from orbital and reentry vehicles as well as air-to-air and cruise missile tests. This included support of tests conducted at Cape Canaveral Air Force Station, Florida; Vandenberg Air Force Base, California; Hill Air Force Base, Utah; Eglin Air Force Base, Florida; and from ships and submarines. Normally, data was obtained in locations such as broad ocean areas and remote land areas outside the coverage of ground stations.

ARIA aircraft also flew the Cruise Missile Mission Control Aircraft (CMMCA) missions. These missions could require up to five hours of continuoous tracking. The vehicle being tracked flew below the ARIA and real-time data was relayed directly to ground stations. ARIA aircraft also flew as the primary remote command & control/flight termination system for these missions and mission commanders could steer the device by remote control with an on-board joystick. CMMCA aircraft were divided into two groups: The phase 0 CMMCA was used to monitor and control a cruise missile throughout its flight. The Advanced CMMCA provided the same capabilities plus a tracking/surveillance radar for stand-alone operations and real-time data processing and display.

The unit' ARIA and NKC-135s supported a variety of national and international customers, both military and commercial, including NASA and Department of Defense missions supporting unmanned space launches, cruise missile tests, Army, Navy and Air Force ballistic missile tests and space shuttle launches. Other missions supported include international treaty verification, electronic combat and vulnerability analysis.

As of June 2000 Navy instructor pilots briefly used EC-18Bs from the 452nd to train aircrews for Boeing E-6B Mercury aircraft, providing communication links between national command authorities and U.S. strategic nuclear forces. Cadre from Fleet Air Reconnaissance Squadron 7 (VQ-7) at Tinker Air Force Base, Oklahoma, rotated to Edwards periodically to train pilots and navigators aboard the EC-18s. After returning to Oklahoma, they made several E-6 flights before graduating from the program. VQ-7 was using 452d aircraft because one of its two aging trainers, a TC-18, was grounded after an FAA-mandated inspection. The EC-18 and TC-18 were both modified Boeing 707s, and with the EC-18not flying as frequently as in the past, it was available for the Navy's immediate need.

On 10 February 1998 the annual Force Structure Announcement formalized adjustments to the aircraft fleet at Edwards, included the loss of one EC-18 and one EC-135 aircraft. These changes were the result a continuation of the normal fleet adjustments which occur at Edwards as test programs change and the general test aircraft fleet is upgraded and modernized. By late 2000 all but two of the fleet had been retired, and support of the EC-18 and NKC-135 was transferred to the 418th Flight Test Squadron on 1 October.

==== YAL-1 Airborne Laser Aircraft ====
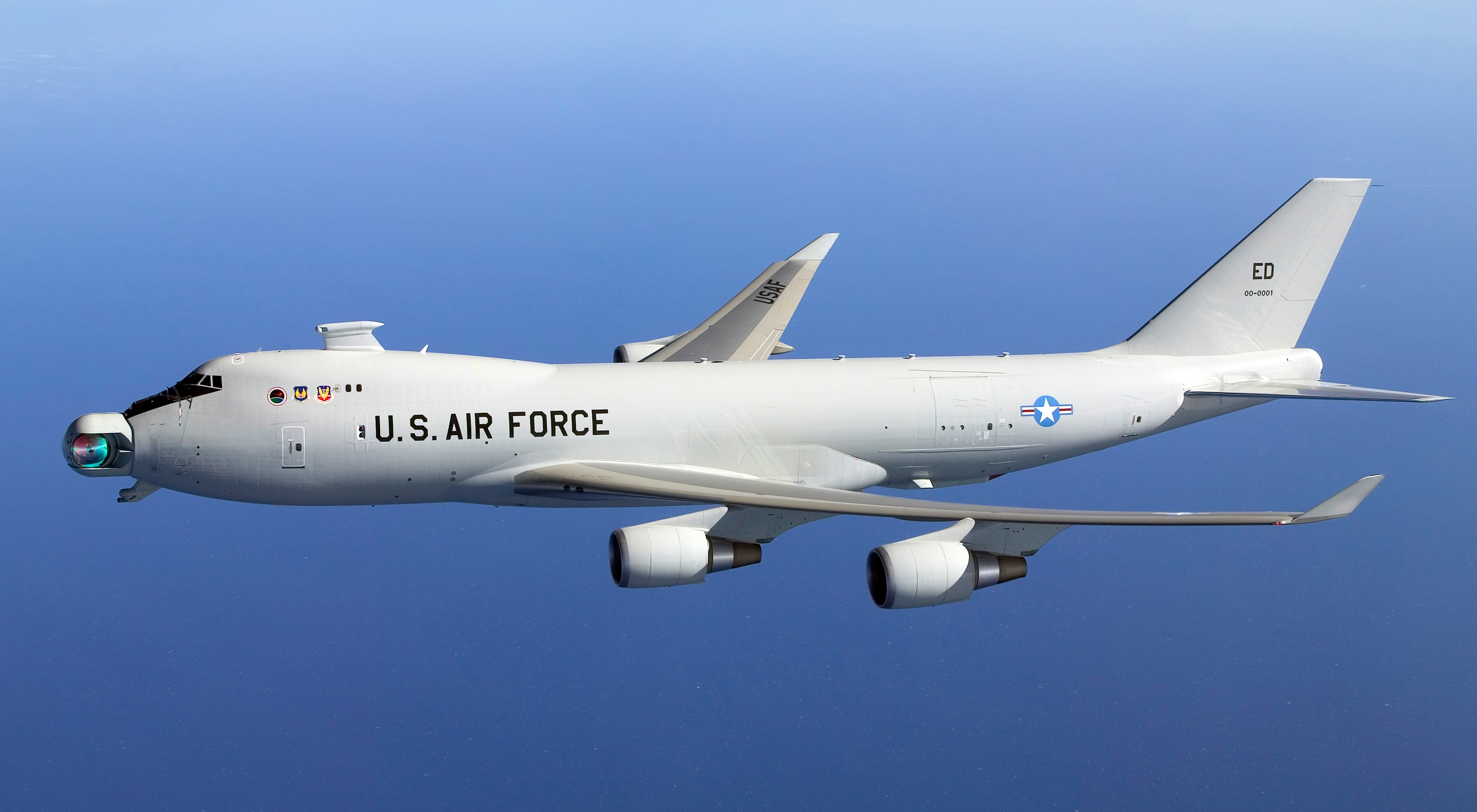
YAL-1A Airborne Laser in flight with the mirror unstowed (Note: Aircraft is Boeing YAL-1A, serial 00-0001. Converted from civilian Boeing 747-4G4F. It was transferred to the Aerospace Maintenance and Regeneration Center on 14 February 2012 and scrapped in late 2014. Baugher, Joe (5 August 2023). "2000 USAF Serial Numbers". Joe Baugher.)

In December 2002, the 452d received the YAL-1 Airborne Laser Aircraft, a modified Boeing 747-400F freighter. In July 2002, the modified aircraft took the first of a series of test flights. After receiving airworthiness certification, the aircraft was flown to Edwards Air Force Base, California, in December 2002, for the installation of systems. As part of the YAL-1 program, Detachment 2 of the squadron was established at Kirtland Air Force Base, New Mexico. The YAL-1A, made more than a dozen flights demonstrating its airworthiness. With only its computers and infrared heat sensors aboard, it successfully tracked a ballistic missile launched from Vandenberg AFB from cloud-break to burnout, confirming it could carry out the first part of its mission.

The aircraft returned to airworthiness flight testing in December 2004 following installation of the beam control/fire control system. In November 2004, all six modules of the chemical oxygen iodine laser were successfully fired for the first time. In August 2005, the YAL-1 completed a series of flight tests demonstrating the performance of the beam and flight control systems. The beacon illuminating laser, able to control the beam to allow for atmospheric distortion, was delivered in January 2006. (Note: Although this article is dated in 2000, it contains information subsequent to that year.) Flight testing of the YAL-1 was transferred to the 417th Flight Test Squadron in March 2006.

==== RQ-4 Global Hawk UAV ====
The squadron began flight testing for the Northrop Grumman RQ-4 Global Hawk UAV in 2004, starting with the RQ-4A Block 10 in a major change in the tyoe of aircraft tested. Subsequently, the unit has tested RQ-4B Blocks 20, 30, 40, and has tested the NATO RQ-4D and Korea and Japan RQ-4 variants. The squadron was inactive from 2010 to 2017. The squadron is the test force for the Global Vigilance Task Force. The squadron marked the end of Global Hawk testing in a ceremony held on 9 June 2023.

== Lineage ==
- Constituted as the 452d Bombardment Squadron (Medium) on 1 June 1942

Activated on 17 July 1942
Redesignated 452d Bombardment Squadron, Medium on 9 October 1944
Inactivated on 12 December 1945

- Redesignated 452d Bombardment Squadron, Light on 3 July 1947

Activated in the Reserve on 9 August 1947
Inactivated on 27 June 1949

- Redesignated 452d Fighter-Day Squadron on 24 March 1954

Activated on 1 July 1954
Inactivated on 18 November 1957

- Redesignated 452d Flying Training Squadron on 28 July 1972

Activated on 1 April 1973
Inactivated on 31 May 1993

- Redesignated 452d Test Squadron on 31 August 1993

Activated on 1 October 1993
Redesignated 452d Flight Test Squadron on 1 March 1994
Inactivated on 30 June 2010

- Activated on 1 March 2017

=== Assignments ===
- 322d Bombardment Group, 17 July 1942 – 12 December 1945
- 322d Bombardment Group, 9 August 1947 – 27 June 1949
- 322d Fighter-Day Group, 1 July 1954 – 18 November 1957
- 323d Flying Training Wing, 1 April 1973
- 323d Operations Group, 15 December 1991 – 31 May 1993
- 412th Operations Group, 1 October 1993 – 30 June 2010
- 412th Operations Group, 1 March 2017 – present

=== Stations ===
- MacDill Field, Florida, 17 July 1942
- Drane Field, Florida, 22 September – 15 November 1942
- RAF Rattlesden (AAF-126), England, 1 December 1942
- RAF Bury St Edmunds (Rougham) (AAF-468), England, 22 March 1943
- RAF Great Saling (later Andrews Field) (AAF-485), England, 12 June 1943
- Beauvais/Tille Airfield (A-61) (also B-42), France, c. 29 September 1944
- Le Culot Airfield (A-89), (also B-68), Belgium, c. 26 March 1945
- Wickenrode, Germany, June 1945
- Hornel, Germany, July 1945
- Clastres Airfield (A-71), France, c. 1 October – 3 December 1945
- Camp Myles Standish, Massachusetts, 11–12 December 1945
- Reading Army Air Field (later Reading Municipal Airport), Pennsylvania, 9 August 1947 – 27 June 1949
- Foster Air Force Base, Texas, 1 July 1954 – 18 November 1957 (deployed to Landstuhl Air Base, West Germany), 20 September – 4 October 1956)
- Mather Air Force Base, California, 1 April 1973 – 31 May 1993
- Edwards Air Force Base, California, 1 October 1993 – 30 June 2010
- Edwards Air Force Base, California, 1 March 2017 – present

=== Aircraft ===
- Martin B-26 Marauder, 1942–1945
- North American AT-6 Texan, 1947–1949
- Beechcraft AT-7 Navigator, 1947–1949
- Beechcraft AT-11 Kansan, 1947–1949
- North American F-86 Sabre, 1954–1955
- North American F-100 Super Sabre, 1955–1957
- Convair T-29 Flying Classroom, 1973–1975
- Boeing T-43 Bobcat, 1973–1993
- Boeing KC-135 Stratotanker, 1993–2001
- Boeing NKC-135, 1993–2001
- Boeing EC-135E Advanced Range Instrumentation Aircraft, 1994–2001
- Boeing EC-18B Advanced Range Instrumentation Aircraft, 1994–2001
- Boeing YAL-1, 2002–2006
- Northrop Grumman RQ-4 Global Hawk, 2006–2010, 2017-2023

=== Awards and campaigns ===
Award streamer	Award	Dates	Notes
	Distinguished Unit Citation	[17 July] 1943 – 24 July 1944	European Theater of Operations, 452nd Bombardment Squadron
	Air Force Outstanding Unit Award	1 April – 31 December 1973	452nd Flying Training Squadron
	Air Force Outstanding Unit Award	1 January 1976 – 28 February 1977	452nd Flying Training Squadron
	Air Force Outstanding Unit Award	1 January 1978 – 30 April 1979	452nd Flying Training Squadron
	Air Force Outstanding Unit Award	1 January 1980 – 30 April 1981	452nd Flying Training Squadron
	Air Force Outstanding Unit Award	1 January 1996 – 31 December 1996	452nd Flight Test Squadron
	Air Force Outstanding Unit Award	1 January 1997 – 31 December 1998	452nd Flight Test Squadron 1 Jan-[30 Jun 2010]
	Air Force Outstanding Unit Award	1 January 2010 – [30 June 2010] (Note: award period ends on 31 December 2011, but the squadron was inactivated on 30 June 2010. Award dates edited by Air Force Historical Research Agency.)	

Campaign Streamer	Campaign	Dates	Notes
	Air Offensive, Europe	14 May 1943 – 5 June 1944	452nd Bombardment Squadron
	Air Combat, EAME Theater	14 May 1943 – 11 May 1945	452nd Bombardment Squadron
	Normandy	6 June 1944 – 24 July 1944	452nd Bombardment Squadron
	Northern France	25 July 1944 – 14 September 1944	452nd Bombardment Squadron
	Rhineland	15 September 1944 – 21 March 1945	452nd Bombardment Squadron
	Ardennes-Alsace	16 December 1944 – 25 January 1945	452nd Bombardment Squadron
	Central Europe	22 March 1944 – 21 May 1945	452nd Bombardment Squadron

== See also ==
- List of United States Air Force test squadrons
- List of F-86 Sabre units
- List of F-100 units of the United States Air Force
