= Silk purse =

Silk purse may refer to:

- Silk Purse (Linda Ronstadt album)
- Operation Silk Purse
