= Ronald W. Yates =

United States Air Force general

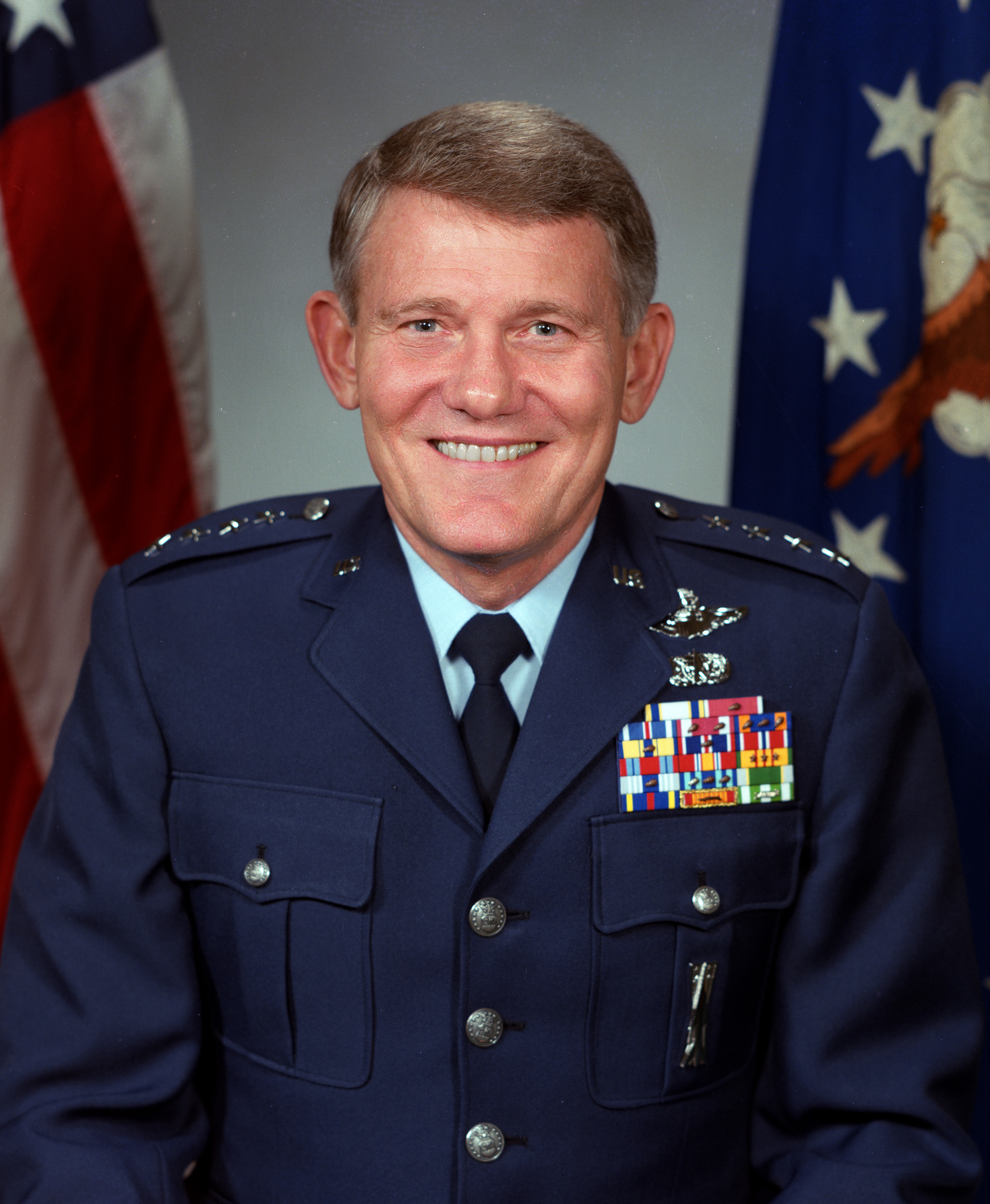
- General Ronald W. Yates
- Born: October 3, 1938 (age 88); Memphis, Tennessee
- Military career
- Allegiance: United States of America
- Branch: United States Air Force
- Rank: General
- Commands: Air Force Materiel Command; Air Force Systems Command; 4950th Test Wing
- Conflicts: Vietnam War
- Awards: Legion of Merit (2); Distinguished Flying Cross; Air Medal (4)

General Ronald Wilburn Yates (born October 3, 1938) served as Commander, Air Force Materiel Command, Wright-Patterson Air Force Base, Ohio. As AFMC Commander, Yates was responsible for research, development, test, acquisition and logistics support for the Air Force from 18 specialized centers and 116,000 military and civilian employees around the world.

== Background ==
Yates graduated from the United States Air Force Academy in 1960. He has served as a test pilot, flying a variety of modified fighter aircraft, as program manager for a variety of weapon systems, and as commander of a test wing. General Yates also served as commander of Air Force Systems Command. He is a command test pilot with more than 4,400 flying hours, and flew 100 combat missions in Southeast Asia. In March 1994 he was inducted into the AFMC Order of the Sword. He retired from active duty on July 1, 1995.

== Education ==
- 1960 Bachelor of Science degree in military science, United States Air Force Academy, Colorado Springs, Colorado
- 1964 Squadron Officer School, Maxwell AFB, Alabama
- 1969 Aerospace Research Pilot School, Edwards Air Force Base, California
- 1970 Master of Science degree in systems management, University of Southern California
- 1970 Air Command and Staff College, Maxwell AFB, Alabama
- 1973 Defense Systems Management College, Fort Belvoir, Virginia
- 1977 Industrial College of the Armed Forces, Fort Lesley J. McNair, Washington, D.C.

== Assignments ==
- June 1960 - November 1962, student, aviation training, Spence AB, Georgia, Webb AFB and Perrin AFB, Texas
- December 1962 - June 1964, pilot, 68th Fighter Interceptor Squadron, Itazuke Air Base, Japan
- June 1964 - June 1966, pilot, 509th Fighter Interceptor Squadron, Clark AB, Philippines
- July 1966 - December 1970, student, test pilot, Aerospace Research Pilot School; then Chief, Aerospace Research Pilot Branch, Aerospace Research Pilot School, Edwards AFB, California
- January 1971 - January 1973, Director, Senior Officer Management, Headquarters Air Force Systems Command, Andrews AFB, Maryland
- January 1973 - July 1973, student, Defense Systems Management College, Fort Belvoir, Virginia
- July 1973 - August 1976, Director, Development Test, A-10 System Program Office, Aeronautical Systems Division, Wright-Patterson AFB, Ohio
- August 1976 - June 1977, student, Industrial College of the Armed Forces, Fort Lesley J. McNair, Washington, D.C.
- July 1977 - March 1979, program element monitor, F-16 program, Office of the Deputy Chief of Staff for Research and Development, Headquarters U.S. Air Force, Washington, D.C.
- April 1979 - June 1980, Deputy Program Director, F-15 program, Aeronautical Systems Division, Wright-Patterson AFB, Ohio
- July 1980 - July 1981, Program Director, F-15 program, Aeronautical Systems Division, Wright-Patterson AFB, Ohio
- July 1981 - April 1983, Commander, 4950th Test Wing, Wright-Patterson AFB, Ohio
- April 1983 - August 1983, Director, tactical systems, Aeronautical Systems Division, Wright-Patterson AFB, Ohio
- August 1983 - July 1986, System Program Director, F-16 System Program Office, Aeronautical Systems Division, Wright-Patterson AFB, Ohio
- July 1986 - January 1989, Director, Tactical Programs, Office of the Secretary of the Air Force for Acquisition, Washington, D.C.
- January 1989 - April 1990, Principal Deputy, Office of the Assistant Secretary of the Air Force for Acquisition, Washington, D.C.
- April 1990 - June 1992, Commander, Air Force Systems Command, Andrews AFB, Maryland
- July 1992 - July 1995, Commander, Air Force Materiel Command, Wright-Patterson AFB, Ohio

== Flight information ==
- Rating: Command pilot, test pilot
- Flight hours: More than 4,400
- Aircraft flown: More than 50 aircraft types

== Awards and decorations ==
- Air Force Distinguished Service Medal
- Legion of Merit with oak leaf cluster
- Distinguished Flying Cross
- Meritorious Service Medal with two oak leaf clusters
- Air Medal with three oak leaf clusters
- Air Force Commendation Medal with two oak leaf clusters
- Vietnam Service Medal with three bronze stars
- Republic of Vietnam Gallantry Cross with Palm
- Republic of Vietnam Campaign Medal
