= Adarsh Credit Cooperative Society =

Fraudulent scheme

- Industry: Credit Cooperative Societies, Financial Services
- Founder: Mr. Mukesh Modi
- Headquarters: Ahmedabad
- Number of locations: 809
- Area served: PAN India
- Key people: Mr. Rahul Modi
- Members: 1.9 Million
- Website: http://adarshcredit.in

The Adarsh Credit Co-operative Society (ACCS) is a Ponzi scheme fraudulently registered under the MSCS Act w.e.f. 1986. It opened in 1999, primarily to bluff the public in Rajasthan, and all money has been siphoned off by the family members of the owners to buy properties and dupe investors of funds worth Rs. 8,000 Crore.

Founded by Mukesh Modi, Adarsh Credit Ponzi Scheme was led by Rahul Modi (Managing Director & CEO). Adarsh Credit Co-operative Society Ltd. has over 3.3 lakh advisors and is serving more than 1.9 million members across India as on 30 Jan 2018.

Adarsh Credit opened its 100th branch in 2008 and was granted the stature of Multistate Co-Operative Society by the Ministry of Agriculture, Government of India. It had 809 branches (as on August 31, 2016) in PAN India (except Dadra & Nagar Haveli and Lakshadweep) and become India's leading credit co-operative society in terms of branch network, advisor strength, deposit procurement and running shell companies out of poor people's money.

== Ponzi Scheme and Scam Exposure ==
The Serious Fraud Investigation Office (SFIO) has arrested founders of Adarsh Credit Cooperative Society, Mukesh Modi and Rahul Modi. Mukesh and his family members were reportedly running Ponzi schemes, duping over than 20 lakh depositors, according to official sources.

Finally order issued by Central Registrar on 6 December 2018 reads,

“Adarsh Credit Cooperative Society has been given reasonable opportunity of hearing, however, the society has failed to provide any satisfactory explanation/justification for the irregularities pointed out. The society has been found to indulge in misusing the funds of the members for personal gains and has violated Cooperative Principles and the provisions of the MSCS Act, 2002.”“Now, therefore, after careful consideration of above facts and in the fitness of things, I Dr. Abhilaksh Likhi, Central Registrar of Cooperative Societies, in exercise of powers conferred under sub-section 2(b) of section 86 of the MSCS Act, 2002, direct to wind up the above society and hereby appoint Shri H.S. Patel, IAS (Retd.), Plot No. 338, Sector No. 8B, CH Road, Gandhinagar, Gujarat – 382007, as Liquidator under section 89(1) of the Act for winding up of the above society as per the provisions of the MSCS Act, 2002 & Rules made there under”, it further reads. All fraud family members of Modi running the scam behind shell companies are now arrested. Those arrested by the Rajasthan police include Virendra Modi (ex-chairman of ACCSL), Priyanka Modi (ex-MD of ACCSL), Sameer Modi (CFO ACCSL), Rohit Modi (asst MD of ACCSL), Bharat Modi (director of Aditya Mega Project Pvt Ltd), Lalita Rajpurohit (Ex-MD of ACCSL), Kamlesh Choudhary (ex-chairman of ACCSL), Ishwar Singh Sindhal (chairman of ACCSL), Vaibhav Lodha (senior vice-president of ACCSL).

The Enforcement Directorate (ED) attached properties total worth Rs 1,489 crore in connection with a case of embezzlement of public deposits by Adarsh Credit Cooperative Society Ltd under the Prevention of Money Laundering Act, 2002.

Government Of India has given instruction for winding up the society under the provisions of the MSCS Act, 2002 (& Rules made thereunder)
