= 10th Airborne Command and Control Squadron =

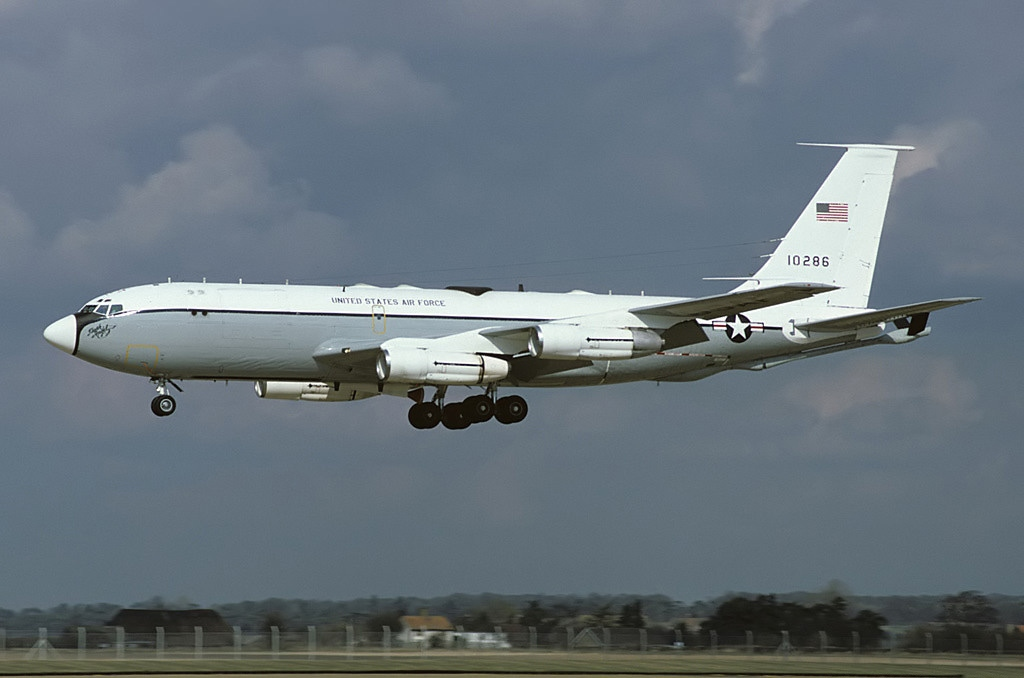
- Boeing EC-135 landing at RAF Mildenhall
- Active: 1942–1944; 1951–1955; 1967–1957; 1970–1991
- Country: United States
- Branch: United States Air Force
- Role: command and control
- Part of: United States Air Forces Europe
- Nickname: Skoshi Tiger (1966–1967) Silk Purse (1970–1991)
- Engagements: Korean War; Vietnam War
- Decorations: Presidential Unit Citation; Air Force Outstanding Unit Award; Vietnamese Gallantry Cross with Palm

Insignia
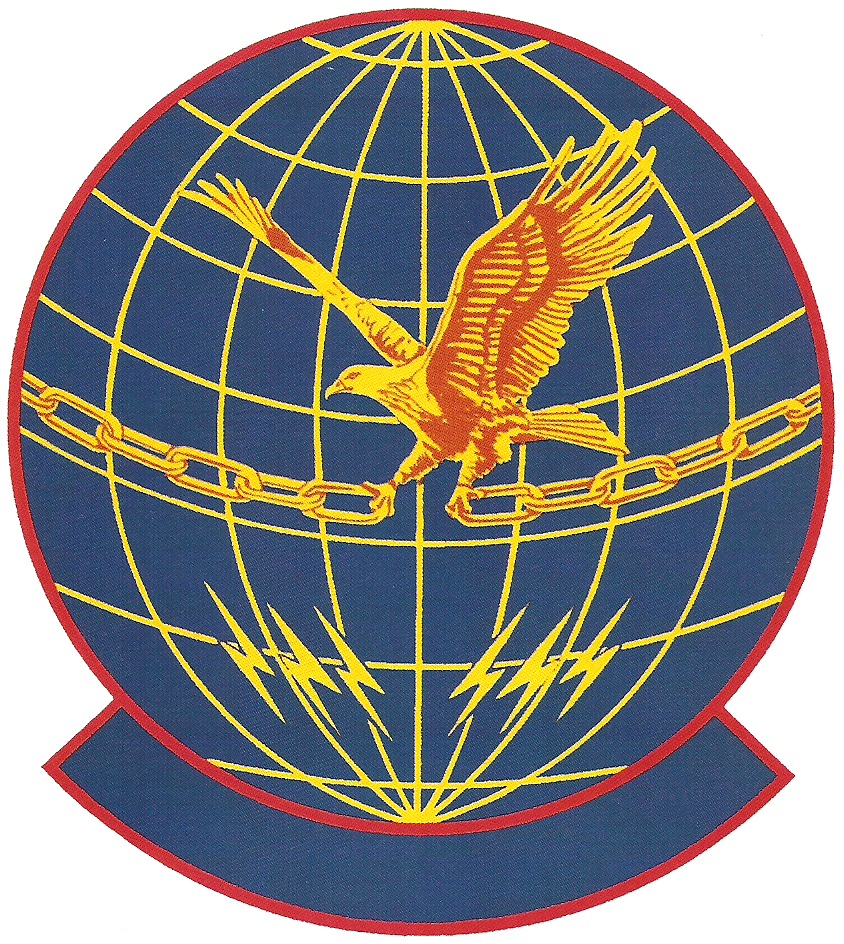
- 10th Airborne Command and Control Squadron emblem

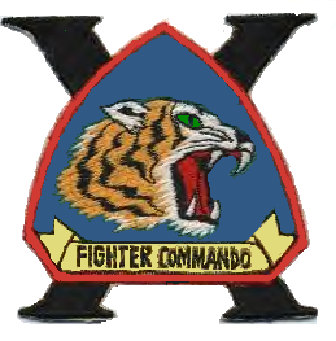
- 10th Fighter Squadron, Commando emblem

The 10th Airborne Command and Control Squadron is an inactive United States Air Force unit that flew airborne command post aircraft from RAF Mildenhall, England from January 1970 to December 1991. Through a unit consolidation in September 1985, the squadron has roots in units that participated in World War II, the Korean War and the Vietnam War

The first predecessor of the squadron was the 10th Transport Squadron, which flew distinguished visitors to all areas of the globe where the Allies of World War II operated. It was disbanded in the spring of 1944 in a reorganization of Army Air Forces units.

The 10th's second predecessor was the 10th Liaison Squadron, which provided light airlift support to Fifth Air Force units during the Korean War, this squadron was inactivated in 1955.

The final predecessor was the 10th Fighter Squadron, Commando, which performed combat testing of the Northrop F-5 Freedom Fighter from April 1966 until the planes were transferred to the Viet Nam Air Force in April 1967. These three units were consolidated into a single unit in September 1985.

== History ==
=== World War II ===
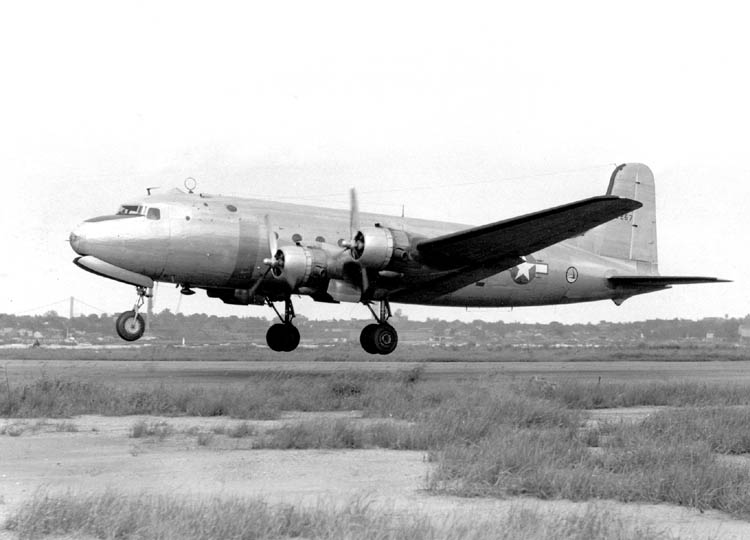
Air Transport Command C-54A

The first predecessor of the squadron was activated on 1 March 1942 as the 10th Air Corps Ferrying Squadron at Bolling Field and equipped with a variety of transport aircraft. The squadron was the flying component of the newly-formed Bolling Field Sector, Air Corps Ferrying Command and was part of the command's Foreign Wing. The squadron not only ferried aircraft overseas, it transported equipment and high-ranking officials on trans-Atlantic flights. It flew missions to support Operation Torch, the invasion of North Africa in late 1942 and early 1943.

In March 1943, the squadron became the 10th Transport Squadron and moved to General Billy Mitchell Field, Wisconsin. It flew high ranking personnel to locations in the Americas, the Far East and the Southwest Pacific, notably, in October a squadron Douglas C-54 Skymaster transported ambassador Averell Harriman from Washington, DC to Moscow. The squadron became non-operational at the beginning of 1944, when most its personnel were transferred to the headquarters of the 26th Transport Group. Although the squadron nominally remained behind at General Mitchell Field, the group moved to Gravelly Point, Virginia, where it continued transporting distinguished visitors.

However, the Army Air Forces was finding that standard military units, based on relatively inflexible tables of organization not well adapted to support missions. Accordingly, it adopted a more functional system in which each base was organized into a separate numbered unit. Air Transport Command personnel at General Mitchell Field when the squadron disbanded there were merged into the 567th AAF Base Unit (14th Ferrying Service Station), while those at Gravelly Point became the 503d AAF Base Unit (26th Transport Group, Washington National Airport). (Note: The 503d became the first unit to operate a presidential aircraft, the "Sacred Cow", for President Franklin D. Roosevelt.)

=== Korean War ===
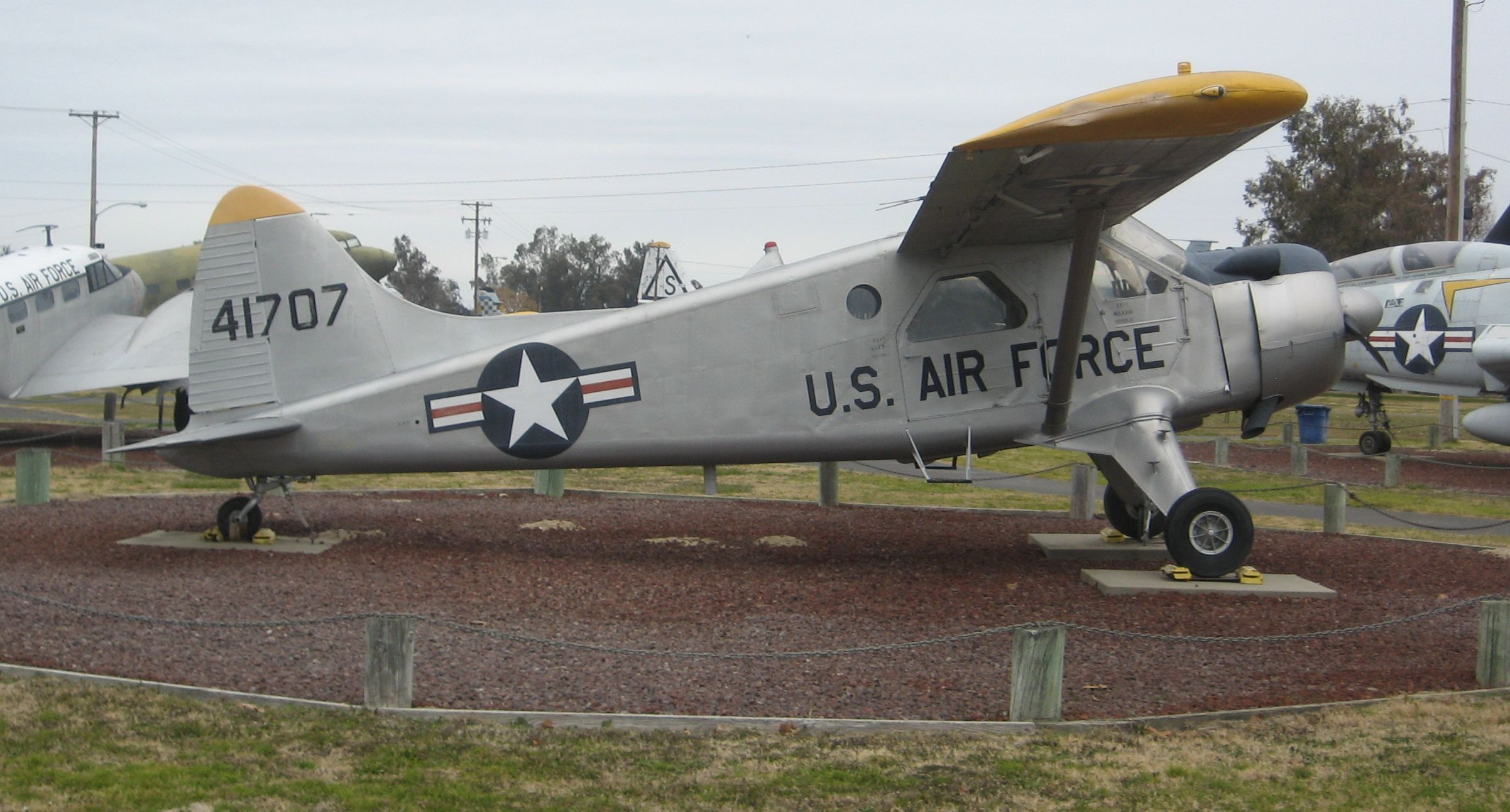
L-20 Beaver

The second predecessor of the squadron, the 10th Liaison Squadron was activated at Seoul Air Base in July 1951 and assigned to Fifth Air Force. Far East Air Forces had requested the organization of a unit that included Sikorsky H-19 helicopters to enable it to perform aeromedical evacuation missions, but the squadron was authorized only fixed wing aircraft, limiting its mission to serving as a light transport and communications unit in Korea until inactivating in 1955. It was equipped with Stinson L-5 Sentinel and de Havilland Canada L-20 Beaver aircraft. It provided light airlift to forward units and provided courier service. It surveyed forward areas for potential sites for landing strips, and communications and radar sites. It performed regular reconnaissance of abandoned airstrips. On occasion it transported North Korean prisoners of war and airdropped arms and supplies to guerillas operating behind enemy lines. Following the armistice in Korea, it was inactivated in March 1955.

=== Skoshi Tiger ===
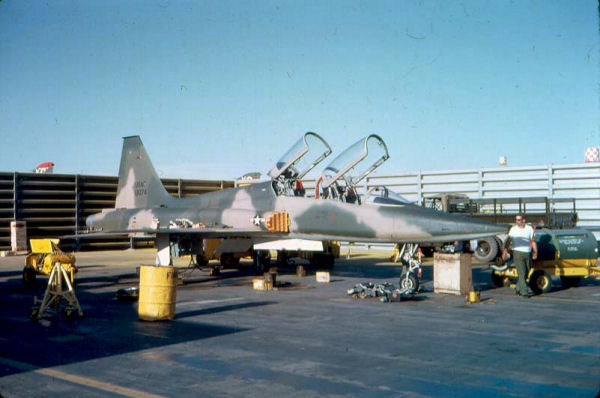
F-5B at Bien Hoa AB

The 10th Fighter Squadron, Commando was activated at Bien Hoa Air Base, South Vietnam in April 1967 to operate the Northrop F-5 Freedom Fighter in combat missions. Tactical Air Command had organized the Tactical Fighter Squadron, Provisional, 4503d at Williams Air Force Base, Arizona to begin testing the F-5 under the name "Skoshi Tiger" (Note: Skoshi (or Skosh) was military slang for small, derived from Japanese. The F-5 was much smaller than USAF fighters in operation at the time.) on 22 July 1965, with pilots and maintenance personnel from the USAF Tactical Air Warfare Center. After conducting initial training and tests in the United States, the 4503d deployed a dozen of its fighters to Bien Hoa in October 1965, although the squadron officially remained at Williams until 10 March 1966. On 8 April, the provisional squadron was discontinued and its personnel and equipment were used to form the regular 10th Squadron.

The squadron increased in size to 18 aircraft. (Note: Although authorized 18 planes, maximum strength was 17. Tambini, p. 21.) It flew more than 7,000 operational missions, (Note: It is not clear if the mission total includes those flown by the 4503d Squadron as well as the 10th.) earning a Presidential Unit Citation and a Vietnamese Gallantry Cross with Palm. Six squadron aircraft were lost to enemy fire. (Note: Earlier, the 4503rd has lost one F-5. Tambini, p. 19) In October 1966, the squadron began to train Republic of Vietnam Air Force (RVNAF) personnel on the operation and maintenance of the F-5. After a year of testing, its aircraft were turned over to the 522nd Fighter Squadron of the RVNAF 23rd Tactical Wing at Bien Hoa on 17 April 1967 and the unit was inactivated, although some squadron personnel remained behind to continue the training mission.

=== Airborne Command and Control ===
The 10th Airborne Command Control Squadron was activated at RAF Mildenhall in January 1970, where it replaced the 7120th Airborne Command Control Squadron to provide an airborne command post for United States Air Forces Europe. The 7120th had performed this mission (Operation Silk Purse) since 1 December 1961, when it was activated at Chateauroux Air Base, France under the 322d Air Division. Seven months later, the squadron was assigned to the host organization at Chateauroux, the 7322d Air Base Group. The 7120th was redesignated as an airborne command control squadron on 1 October 1965, and moved to Mildenhall the following month, where it became part of the 513th Troop Carrier Wing on 1 July 1966.

The squadron's crews flew the Boeing EC-135H Airborne Command Post to support the United States Commander-in-Chief, Europe. The battle staff in the planes were from another organization. Squadron EC-135s also served as aerial tankers after 1972. The aircraft provided communications support during exercises in support of NATO, and other agencies following overwater routes near Europe. The planes also stood alert for emergency launches at Mildenhall. In 1970 and 1980, they operated from RAF Lakenheath while repairs were made on the runway at Mildenhall. With the end of the Cold War, the squadron was inactivated at the end of 1991.

== Lineage ==
- 10th Transport Squadron
  - Constituted as the 10th Air Corps Ferry Squadron on 18 February 1942
  - Activated on 1 March 1942
  - Redesignated 10th Transport Squadron on 9 March 1943
  - Disbanded on 31 March 1944
  - Reconstituted and consolidated with the 10th Liaison Squadron, 10th Fighter Squadron, Commando and 10th Airborne Command Control Squadron as the 10th Airborne Command Control Squadron on 19 September 1985
- 10th Liaison Squadron
  - Constituted as the 10th Liaison Squadron on 1 June 1951
  - Activated on 25 July 1951
  - Inactivated on 15 March 1955
  - Consolidated with the 10th Transport Squadron, 10th Fighter Squadron, Commando and 10th Airborne Command Control Squadron as the 10th Airborne Command Control Squadron on 19 September 1985
- 10th Fighter Squadron, Commando
  - Constituted on 28 March 1966 as the 10th Fighter Squadron, Commando and activated (not organized)
  - Organized on 8 April 1966
  - Inactivated on 17 April 1967
  - Consolidated with the 10th Transport Squadron, 10th Liaison Squadron and 10th Airborne Command Control Squadron as the 10th Airborne Command Control Squadron on 19 September 1985
- 10th Airborne Command and Control Squadron
  - Constituted as the 10th Airborne Command Control Squadron on 15 September 1969
  - Activated on 1 January 1970
  - Consolidated with the 10th Transport Squadron, 10th Liaison Squadron and 10th Fighter Squadron, Commando on 19 September 1985
  - Redesignated 10th Airborne Command and Control Squadron on 18 June 1987
  - Inactivated on 31 December 1991

=== Assignments ===
- Bolling Field Sector, Air Corps Ferrying Command (later Transatlantic Sector, Air Corps Ferrying Command; Transatlantic Sector, Air Transport Command), 1 March 1942
- Domestic Transportation Division, Air Transport Command, 1 March 1943
- 26th Transport Group, 1 April 1943 – 31 March 1944
- Fifth Air Force, 25 July 1951 – 15 March 1955
- Pacific Air Forces, 28 March 1966 (not organized)
- 3d Tactical Fighter Wing, 8 April 1966 – 17 April 1967
- 513th Tactical Airlift Wing (later 513th Airborne Command and Control Wing), 1 January 1970 – 31 December 1991

=== Stations ===
- Bolling Field, District of Columbia, 1 March 1942
- General Billy Mitchell Field, Wisconsin, 1 March 1943 – 31 March 1944
- Seoul Airdrome (later Seoul Air Base), South Korea, 25 July 1951
- Osan Air Base, South Korea, 28 January 1954 – 15 March 1955
- Bien Hoa Air Base, South Vietnam, 8 April 1966 – 17 April 1967
- RAF Mildenhall, England, 1 January 1970 – 31 December 1991

=== Aircraft ===
- Douglas C-47 Skytrain, 1942-1944
- Consolidated B-24 Liberator, 1942
- Consolidated C-87 Liberator Express, c. 1942-1944
- Curtiss C-46 Commando, c.1943-1944
- Douglas C-54 Skymaster, c.1943-1944
- Lockheed C-56 Lodestar, c. 1942-1944
- Lockheed C-60 Lodestar, c. 1942-1944
- Noorduyn C-64 Norseman, c. 1942-1944
- Douglas UC-67 Dragon, c. 1942-1944
- Douglas C-84, c. 1942-1944
- Stinson L-5 Sentinel, 1951, 1953
- de Havilland Canada L-20 Beaver, 1952-1955
- Northrop F-5 Freedom Fighter, 1966-1967
- Boeing EC-135H, 1970-1991

=== Awards and campaigns ===
Award streamer	Award	Dates	Notes
	Presidential Unit Citation	8 June 1966 – 16 April 1967	10th Fighter Squadron, Commando
	Air Force Outstanding Unit Award	1 July 1969 – 30 June 1970	10th Airborne Command Control Squadron
	Air Force Outstanding Unit Award	1 July 1972 – 30 June 1973	10th Airborne Command Control Squadron
	Air Force Outstanding Unit Award	1 July 1974 – 30 June 1975	10th Airborne Command Control Squadron
	Air Force Outstanding Unit Award	1 July 1975 – 30 June 1976	10th Airborne Command Control Squadron
	Air Force Outstanding Unit Award	1 July 1977 – 30 June 1978	10th Airborne Command Control Squadron
	Air Force Outstanding Unit Award	1 July 1980 – 30 June 1981	10th Airborne Command Control Squadron
	Air Force Outstanding Unit Award	1 July 1983 – 30 June 1985	10th Airborne Command Control Squadron
	Air Force Outstanding Unit Award	1 July 1985 – 30 June 1987	10th Airborne Command Control Squadron
	Air Force Outstanding Unit Award	1 July 1988 – 30 June 1990	10th Airborne Command Control Squadron
	Air Force Outstanding Unit Award	1 July 1990 – 30 June 1991	10th Airborne Command Control Squadron
	Vietnamese Gallantry Cross with Palm	8 April 1966 – 17 April 1967	10th Fighter Squadron, Commando

Campaign Streamer	Campaign	Dates	Notes
	American Theater without inscription	1 March 1942 – 31 March 1944	10th Air Corps Ferry Squadron (later 10th Transport Squadron)
	UN Summer-Fall Offensive	9 July 1951 – 27 November 1951	10th Liaison Squadron
	Second Korean Winter	28 November 1951 – 30 April 1952	10th Liaison Squadron
	Korea Summer-Fall 1952	1 May 1952 – 30 November 1952	10th Liaison Squadron
	Third Korean Winter	1 December 1952 – 30 April 1953	10th Liaison Squadron
	Korea Summer-Fall 1953	1 May 1953 – 27 July 1953	10th Liaison Squadron
	Vietnam Air	8 April 1966 – 28 June 1966	10th Fighter Squadron, Commando
	Vietnam Air Offensive	29 June 1966 – 8 March 1967	10th Fighter Squadron, Commando
	Vietnam Air Offensive, Phase II	9 March 1967 – 17 April 1967	10th Fighter Squadron, Commando

== See also ==
- List of United States Air Force airborne command and control squadrons
- List of United States Air Force fighter squadrons
- List of Douglas C-47 Skytrain operators
