= 4950th Test Wing =

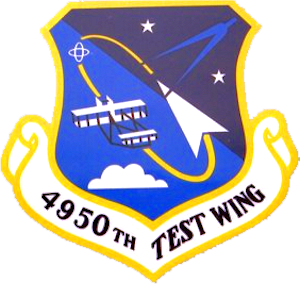
- 4950th Test Wing emblem
- Active: 1971–1994
- Country: United States
- Branch: United States Air Force
- Part of: Air Force Systems Command
- Garrison/HQ: Wright-Patterson Air Force Base

Commanders
- Notable commanders: Ronald W. Yates Col James H. Doolittle III (vice commander)

The 4950th Test Wing, a wing of the United States Air Force, was established in March 1971.

It was created as the flying unit of the Wright Air Development Center, which was created in June 1951. Wright ADC changed to Division status in December 1959 until it was replaced by the Aeronautical Systems Division (ASD) in April 1961. The 4951st, 4952d and 4953d Test Squadrons were activated in July 1975 and based at the West Ramp (a former Strategic Air Command facility) of Wright-Patterson Air Force Base, Ohio.

ASD is responsible for the design, development and acquisition of aeronautical systems including transports, tankers and utility aircraft, rescue helicopters, long- and short-range air-to-surface missiles, aircraft engines and electronic warfare systems. In addition, the wing supported programs conducted by other AFMC departments. The majority of AFMC's large transport aircraft were assigned to the 4950th Test Wing and were loaned to other agencies as required. The 4950th Test Wing operated a variety of testbed C-135s, many of which have featured major modifications. The wing was consolidated with the AFMC Flight Test Center's 412th Test Wing at Edwards AFB, CA and inactivated in 1994.

== Major Command (MAJCOM) ==
- Air Force Systems Command (AFSC) (????-1 June 1991)
- Air Force Materiel Command (AFMC) (1991–1994) – New MAJCOM created by the consolidation of Air Force Logistics Command (AFLC) and Air Force Systems Command (AFSC). Command Headquarters is located in Area "A" of Wright-Patterson Air Force Base.

== Subordinate units ==
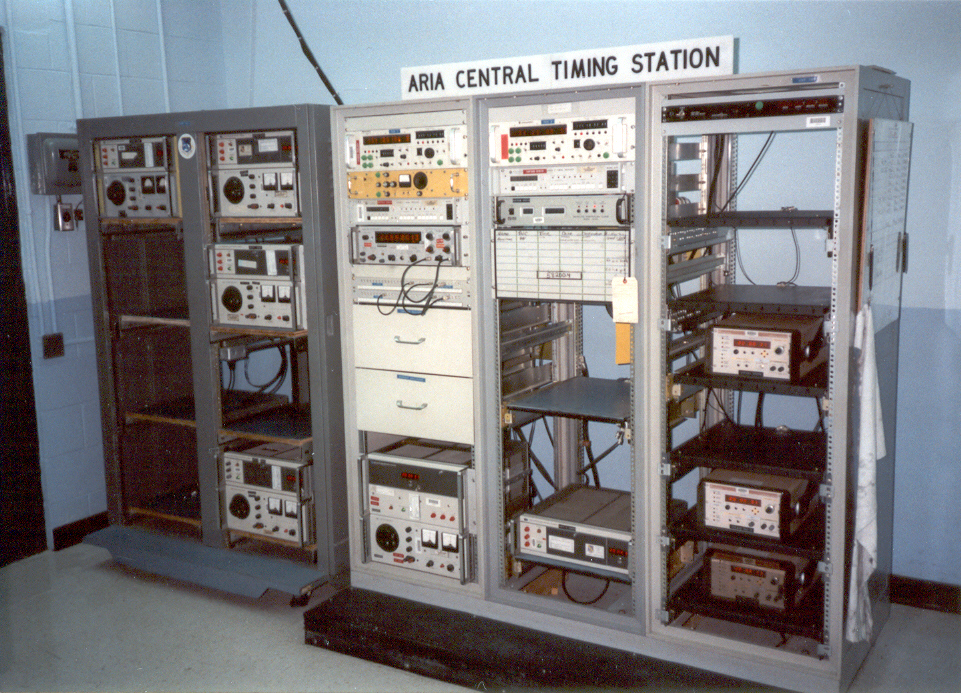
The ARIA Central Timing Station

- 4950th Avionics Maintenance Squadron (July 1975 – March 1992): The 4950th Avionics Maintenance Squadron (AMS) was located in Building 4042, of Wright-Patterson Air Force Base. Personnel assigned to the squadron were responsible for the maintenance of the Prime Mission Electronic Equipment (PMEE) systems aboard the U.S. Air Force's fleet of Apollo/Advanced Range Instrumentation Aircraft. The squadron was part of the 4950th Test Wing, until the Wing moved to Edwards Air Force Base, in the 1990s.
- 4950th Field Maintenance Squadron (1975–1990): The 4950th Field Maintenance Squadron (FMS) was located in Building 13 of Wright-Patterson Air Force Base. Personnel assigned to the squadron were responsible for the shop and flightline level maintenance of specific aircraft systems. This included Engine Shop, Hydraulic Shop, Electric Shop, Sheet Metal Shop, Machine Shop and APU Shop. Aerospace Ground Equipment (AGE) and Engine Flightline Dispatch Shop were located on the West Ramp and the Engine Test Cell was located across from Building 13 in Area "C". The 4950th FMS was absorbed into the 4950th Organizational Maintenance Squadron in 1990 when the Wing reorganized its maintenance units under "Rivet Workforce".
- The 4950th Organizational Maintenance Squadron was located in building 4022, also known as "Dock 2". Personnel assigned to the squadron were responsible for flight line maintenance including ground handling, refueling/defueling, launch and recovery, on-equipment maintenance, and inspections such as pre/post-flight and thru-flight inspections. The OMS consisted of large aircraft, small-aircraft, inspection, and support branches. OMS owned and operated buildings 4022 (command section, maintenance supervision, inspection branch, TO library, tool crib), 4026 (Aero-Repair hangar), 4024 (wash rack) and 4028 ("Dock 1" and the large aircraft branch).

Section updated by Major Tony Sylvain, Maj, USAF (Ret), 4950th OMS, 11 Jun 84 to 21 Jan 92.

- 4951st Test Squadron (July 1975–????)
- 4952d Test Squadron (July 1975 – 1994)
- 4953d Test Squadron (July 1975 – 1994)

== Locations ==
- Wright-Patterson AFB, Ohio (March 1971 – June 1994)

== Aircraft flown ==
- Boeing C-18A (81-0896, 81-0898)
- Boeing EC-18B/D (81-0891, 81-0892, 81-0893, 81-0894, 81-0895)
- Boeing NC-135A (60-0377)
- Boeing NC-135B (61-2662)
- Boeing NKC-135A (55-3119, 55-3120, 55-3122, 55-3123, 55-3124, 55-3125, 55-3127, 55-3128, 55-3129, 55-3132, 55-3131)
- Boeing NKC-135E (55-3135)
- Boeing EC-135E (60-0372, 60-0374, 60-0375, 61-0326, 61-0327, 61-0328, 61-0329, 61-0330, 62-4133, 62-4128)
- Lockheed NC-141A 61-2775, 61-2776, 61-2777, 61-2779

Aircraft 61-2775, 776, and 777 were pre-production prototypes. These aircraft had multiple subtle differences evolved during design, most notable was the main crew door, which was hinged on the top and opened outward from the bottom. These aircraft were never fitted with air refueling capability and were never converted to C-141Bs. Aircraft specifics:

- 61-2775 was the first C-141 to enter service. She was named "First of the Fleet"; now on static display at the Air Mobility Command Museum at Dover AFB, DE.
- 61-2776 was named the "Desert Rat" by her Crew Chiefs, TSgt Patrick Goss and SrA Derek Whisler for her participation in Operation Desert Shield/Desert Storm. She was mainly configured for Central Inertial Guidance Test Facility (CIGTF) missions and regularly performed cargo operations and unique missions such as "ARIA Rescue". She was retired to the bone yard at Davis–Monthan AFB, AZ and "guillotined".
- 61-2777 was named "The Gambler" by her Crew Chief, WG-13 Sam Brasel. She had a large 'tail can or beer can' appendage added to support tests of various tail-warning detector sensor systems, as well as a side-mounted radome 'bubble' for testing side-looking radars. She was also retired to the bone yard at Davis–Monthan AFB, AZ and "guillotined".
- 61-2779 was the second aircraft of the production fleet (61-2778 was first; which was stretched to a "B" model). Named "Against the Wind" by her Crew Chief, WG-13 Paul Laemers (an avid Bob Seger fan from Detroit). 779 was heavily modified to become the Advanced Radar Test Bed (ARTB). Structural modifications included a 'universal nose' which could be interchanged with B-1, F-15, and F-16 nose radomes and radar system housings to support in-flight instrumented radar testing. Racks of interface electronics, computers, data recorders, and operator stations filled the cargo compartment. 61-2779 had the roll up crew entry door that was common to the C-141 fleet. After her retirement, 61-2779 was put on static display at Edwards AFB, CA.
- Lockheed C-130A (55-0022, 55-0024, 57-0461 & 57-0571)
- North American/Rockwell/Sabreliner CT-39A (62-4463)
- North American/Rockwell/Sabreliner NT-39A (59-2870, 59-2873)
- North American/Rockwell/Sabreliner T-39B (59-2874, 60-3474, 60-3475, 60-3476, 60-3477)
- Cessna T-37B (60-0141)

Section updated by Sgt Rob Schultz (FMS Engine Shop/4953rd AMU, 1986–1992), 26 April 2011
