= Operation Silk Purse =

Operation Silk Purse was the United States' airborne nuclear command and control mission for the European theater of operations from 1961 to 1994.

== History ==
From the early 1960s, the SILK PURSE mission was operated from Chateauroux Air Station in France, by the 7120th Airborne Command and Control Squadron, using modified four-engined Douglas C-118 piston transports. In November 1965, the squadron moved to RAF Mildenhall and shortly after converted to the jet-powered Boeing EC-135H airborne command post, callsign Seabell. In 1970, the squadron was redesignated the 10th Airborne Command and Control Squadron.

The 10 ACCS transported an austere battle staff headed by a general or flag officer, designated the Airborne Emergency Action Officer (AEAO). This team stood ready to assume interim authority if the European Command Command Center was destroyed or rendered inoperative.

In the summer of 1984, Lajes Field in the Azores undertook a new mission known as "SILK PURSE." Boeing EC-135s began operating out of Lajes Field as an airborne command post for the U.S. Commander-in-Chief, Europe. Along with the aircraft came the U.S. European Command battle staff and flight crews from United States Air Forces in Europe. This mission was ended in late August 1991.

== SILK PURSE Control Group ==
SILK PURSE Control Group (SPCGp) missions were flown using standardized flight plans. Flights lasted between six and eight hours, depending on mission requirements. The flights were flown on randomly selected routes to ensure that ground communications were used regularly. The SPCGp had six battle support staffs assigned, each consisting of a mini-headquarters staff to support an Airborne Emergency Action Officer (AEAO).

== Operations ==
The operations of SILK PURSE aircraft fed into the following plans:

- USAFE OPLAN 4310
- USAFE OPORD 4815
- USAFE CONPLAN 4226

During practice missions, ground vans with telecommunication receiver equipment were used to test the signal and reliability of USCINCEUR ABNCP transmitting equipment.

== Chronology ==
- 5 Apr 1974: 10 ACCS participates in world-wide National Emergency Airborne Command Post (NEACP) exercise REBOUND ECHO, coinciding with President Richard M. Nixon's visit to France for President Georges Pompidou's funeral.
- 17 Apr 1974: 10 ACCS flew three sorties in support of exercise POLO HAT 74-2.
- Summer 1984: SILK PURSE missions moved to Lajes Field, Azores
- August 1991: SILK PURSE missions from Azores ended

== Aircraft ==
The SILK PURSE missions were originally operated with Douglas C-118 aircraft. In 1964, four KC-135A were converted to airborne command posts as EC-135H SILK PURSE airframes. In 1968, a fifth EC-135H was converted.

In 1988, one was modified to the EC-135P standard. The others were withdrawn by 1992. The modification included a dorsal saddle antenna and an airborne trailing wire antenna (TWA), consisting of a wire approximately 28,000 feet long for very low frequency (VLF) communications on the 487L Survivable Low Frequency Communications System. The aircraft retained the boom aerial refueling equipment and the receptacle system. In 1982, all the aircraft we re-engined with TF33-PW-102 engines.

== Images ==
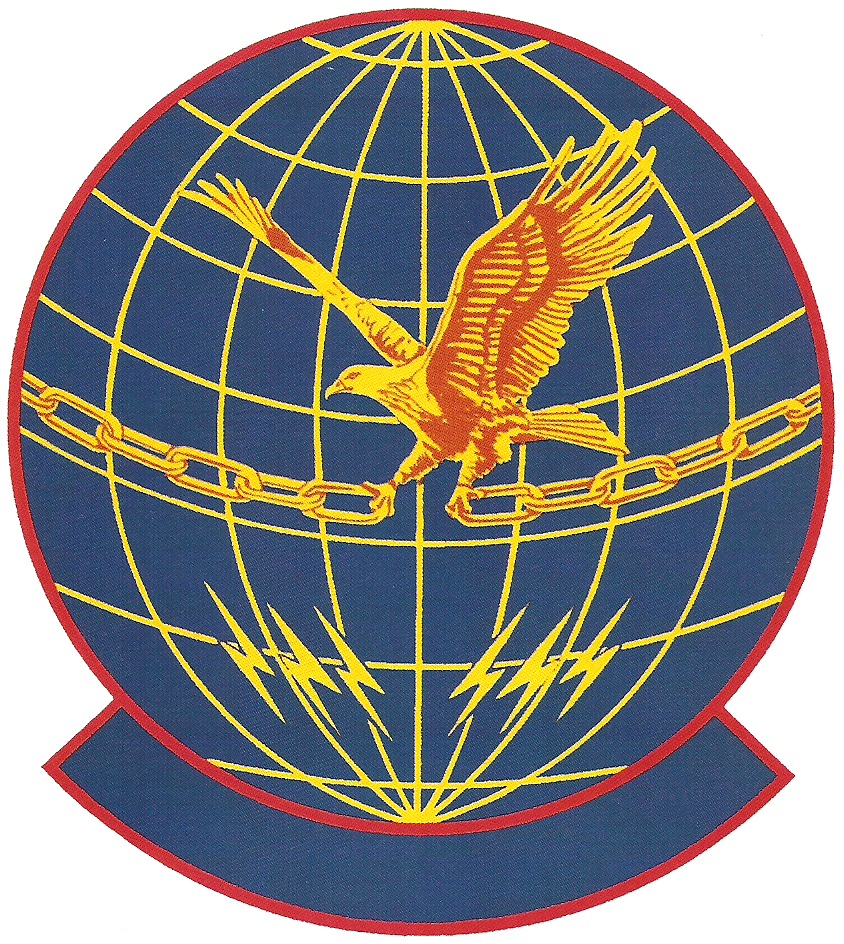
The 10 ACCS Logo
