= Polo Hat =

POLO HAT is an end-to-end communications exercise for United States nuclear command and control forces.

== See also ==
- GIANT BALL - an Airborne Launch Control System (ALCS) exercise
