= American Association of Christian Colleges and Seminaries =

Membership organization

The American Association of Christian Colleges and Seminaries, Inc. (AACCS) is an organization of Bible colleges and Christian universities and seminaries in the continental United States and Puerto Rico. According to AACCS, all of its member institutions are "clearly identified with the historic Christian fundamentalist tradition."

== History ==
The AACCS was originally established in 1985 as an informal division of the American Association of Christian Schools, with which it maintains a continuing relationship. In 1990 the group adopted the name American Association of Christian Colleges and Seminaries, and the AACCS was officially incorporated as an organization in January 2005. As of November 2007, there were 23 member institutions in the AACCS.

The AACCS website states that the organization's services include providing a network for professional training in administrative principles of higher education and providing support for the evaluation of academic progress. Educational accreditation is not among the listed services.

== Membership ==
To qualify for membership, institutions must subscribe to a statement of faith whose provisions include the inerrancy of the Bible; belief in creation, not evolution; belief in the Incarnation, the Virgin Birth, and the deity of Jesus Christ; belief in the necessity of the New Birth; and belief in salvation by grace through faith. Additionally, the AACCS asserts that associations with the World Council of Churches, the National Council of Churches, the modern charismatic movement, the ecumenical movement, and new evangelicalism are "contradictory to the mandates of Scripture and inconsistent with [AACCS' purposes]."
