= Rural credit cooperative =

Cooperative or credit union sanctioned by People's Bank of China

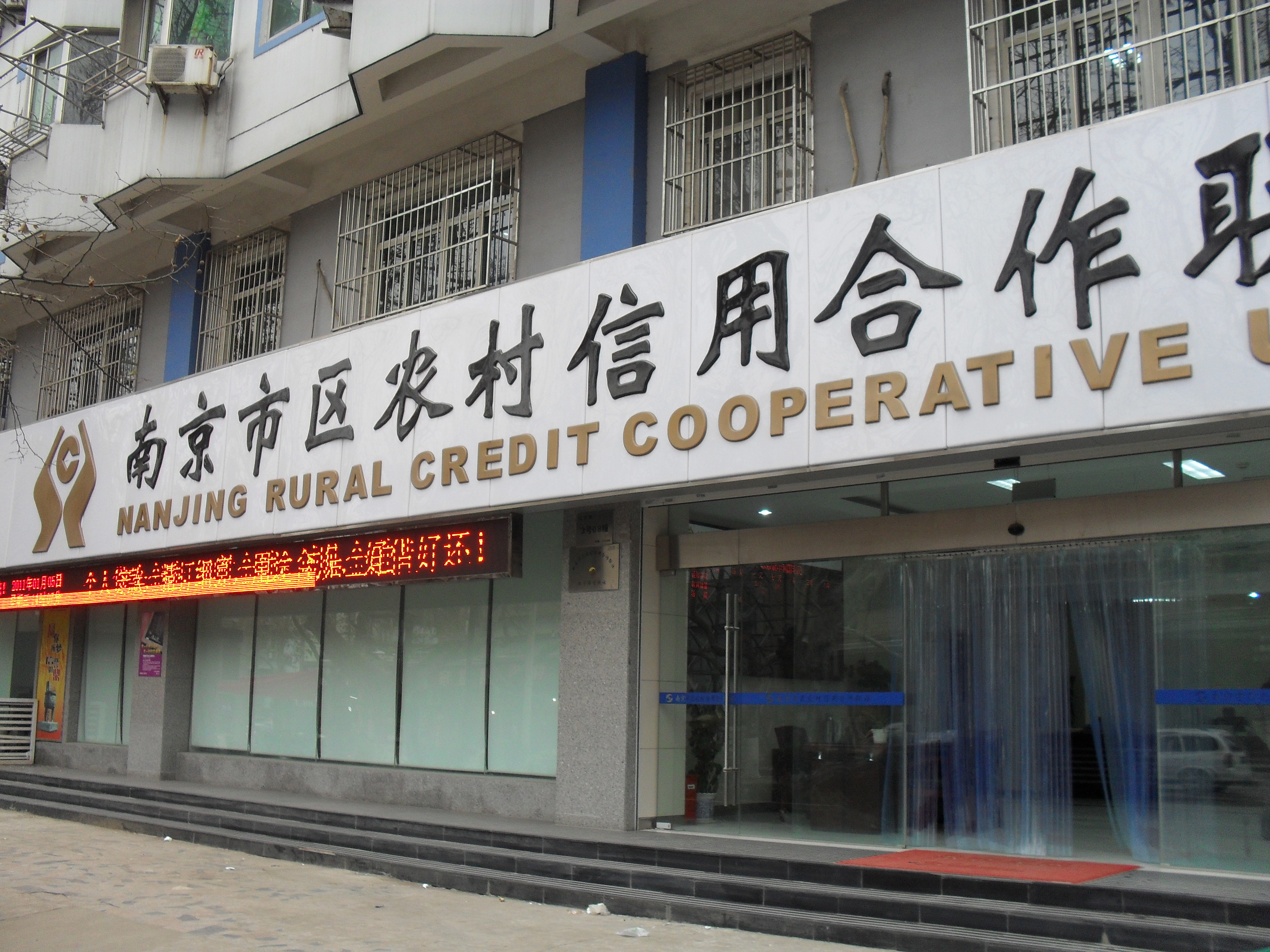
A branch of Nanjing Rural Credit Cooperative Union

A rural credit cooperative (RCC) (Chinese: 农村信用合作社) or (simplified Chinese: 农村信用社; traditional Chinese: 農村信用社; pinyin: nóngcūn xìnyòngshè) is a cooperative or credit union sanctioned by People's Bank of China to provide credit in the rural areas of the People's Republic of China.

== History ==
In the 1950s, a network of rural credit cooperatives was created. At this time, they were not commercial enterprises similar to banks, but rather channeled credit between the state and the people's communes in rural areas.

In the late 1970s, after the reform and opening up enabled some individual entrepreneurialism and the creation of collective enterprises, the RCCs began to function as grassroots banks that provided credit and savings accounts to families and collective enterprises. In the reform era, the RCCs were intended to serve as a means for the Agricultural Bank of China to funnel credit into rural areas. However, the RCCs were insufficient to meet the high demand for credit in these areas.

Individual and enterprises often turn to other sources of credit, which range from rotating savings and credit associations to pawn shops. However, these other forms are all illegal, although some are tolerated to a greater degree than others, and are tolerated in some locations more than in others. Commercial banks are legal, but since fewer than one percent of loans from state banks go to private entrepreneurs, they do not meet the credit needs of rural areas.

Until 1996, the RCCs were supervised by the Agricultural Bank of China. In 1996, they were transferred to the People's Bank of China.

In July 1998, the rural credit foundations (RCF) (simplified Chinese: 农村合作基金会; traditional Chinese: 農村合作基金會; pinyin: nóngcūn hézuò jījīnhuì) were banned when the State Council of the People's Republic of China (simplified Chinese: 国务院; traditional Chinese: 國務院; pinyin: guowuyuan) issued the "Provisions on the Cancellation of Illegal Financial Institutions and Activities". This left the RCCs as the only legal financial institution (other than banks) that served rural enterprises and individuals. As of 1998, when the RCFs were banned, there were approximately 44,000 township-level RCCs and 280,000 village-level RCC branches.

Since 1998, many of the RCCs have gradually been transformed into rural commercial banks (RCBs). The first foreign investment in an RCB was allowed in 2006, when Rabobank and the International Finance Corporation (the private sector arm of the World Bank) acquired stakes in the United Rural Cooperative Bank of Hangzhou.

== Challenges ==
Due to a high volume of non-performing loans, many of the RCCs are technically insolvent. Since 1998, central banking authorities have injected approximately US$4 billion into recapitalization the RCCs, and have considered other measures for improving the performance of the RCCs.

Although the RCCs are gradually being transformed into independent commercial banks (RCBs), they are still not immune from government requests to make policy loans (loans issued for political reasons, such as the desire to support certain politically important industries or firms, rather than because the firm is an attractive candidate for a loan).

== See also ==
- Economy of China
- Chinese financial system
- Banking in China
