= Boeing EC-135 =

Command and control aircraft by Boeing

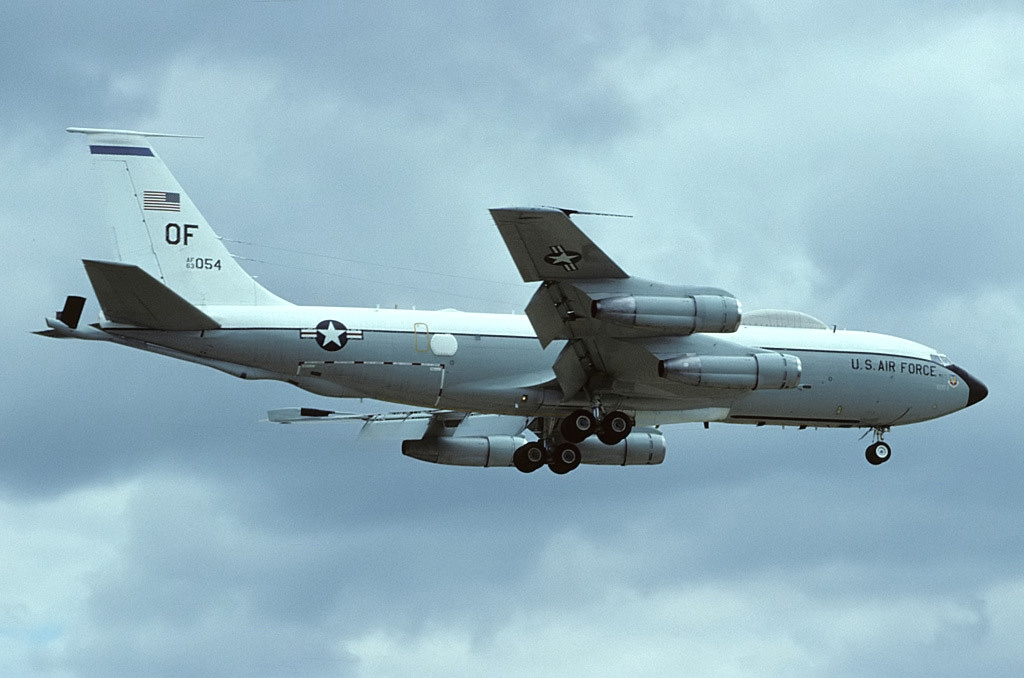
- Boeing EC-135C Looking Glass with Pacer Link modification

General information
- Type: Airborne Command Post, Airborne Launch Control Center, Tracking and Telemetry Platform, Airborne Radio Relay
- Manufacturer: Boeing
- Status: Retired from service
- Primary user: United States Air Force

History
- Introduction date: 1965
- Retired: 2000
- Developed from: Boeing C-135 Stratolifter

The Boeing EC-135 is a retired family of command and control aircraft derived from the Boeing C-135 Stratolifter. During the Cold War, the EC-135 was best known for being modified to perform the Looking Glass mission where one EC-135 was always airborne 24 hours a day to serve as flying command post for the Strategic Air Command in the event of nuclear war. Various other EC-135 aircraft sat on airborne and ground alert throughout the Cold War, with the last EC-135C being retired in 1998. The EC-135N variant served as the tracking aircraft for the Apollo program.

The Boeing E-6B Mercury "TACAMO" replaced the EC-135C.

== Missions ==
=== Looking Glass ===
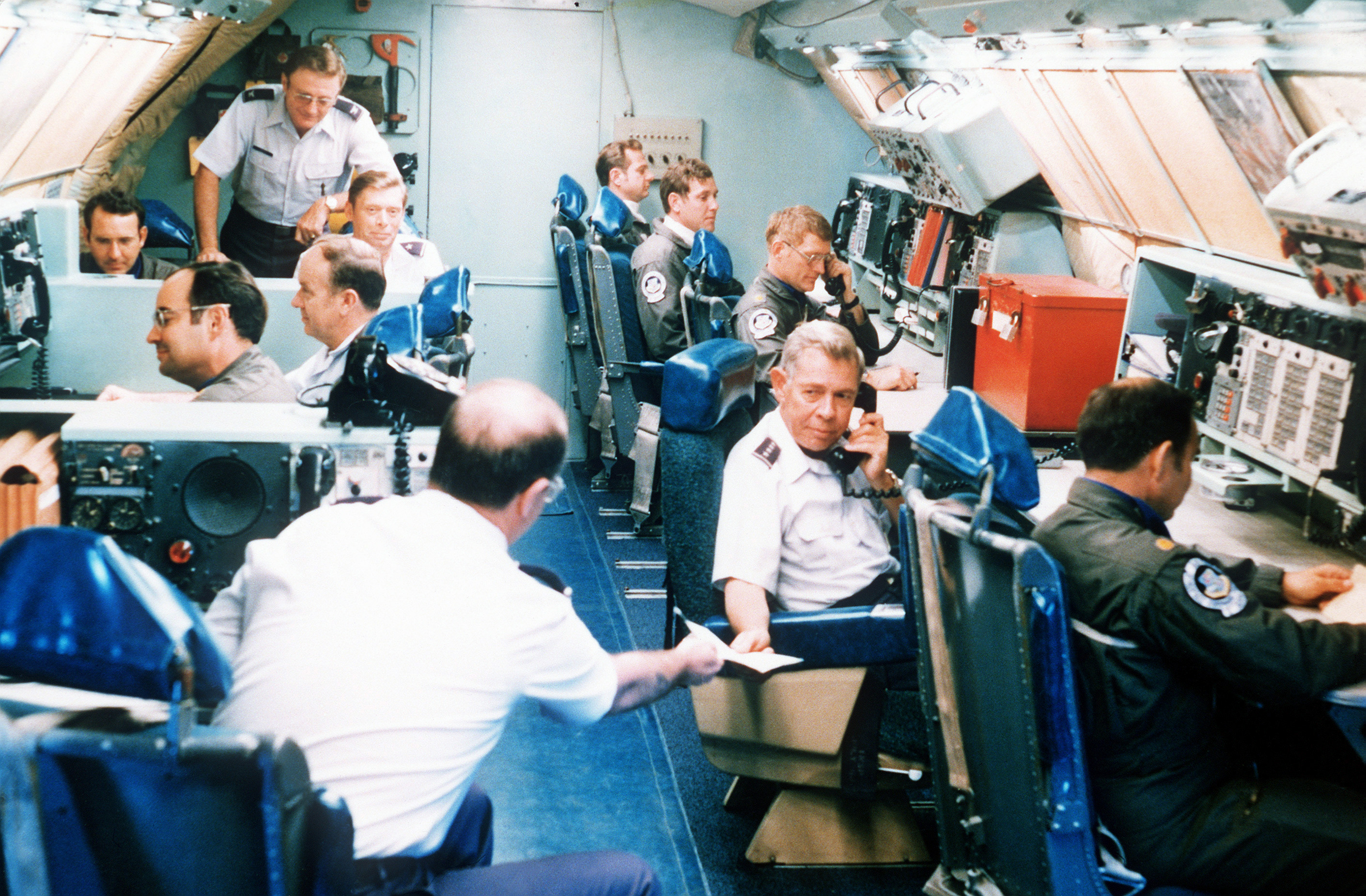
Gen. Richard Ellis, CINCSAC, in battle staff compartment, 1979

Officially known as "Operation Looking Glass", at least 11 EC-135C command post aircraft were provided to the Commander in Chief, Strategic Air Command (CINCSAC), and were based at various locations throughout the United States and worldwide. Operations began in 1961 with the 34th Air Refueling Squadron at Offutt Air Force Base (Nebraska), initially using 5 EC-135As (converted from KC-135As) until the dedicated EC-135Cs entered service in 1964. Originally built as KC-135Bs, they were re-designated as EC-135Cs from 1 January 1965. Other Offutt-based units included the 38th Strategic Reconnaissance Squadron (1966–1970), the 2d Airborne Command and Control Squadron (1970–1994), and the 7th Airborne Command and Control Squadron (1994–1998). Other units operating the Looking Glass mission included the following:

- 913th Air Refueling Squadron at Barksdale Air Force Base (Louisiana) (1963–1970)
- 3rd Airborne Command & Control Squadron at Grissom Air Force Base (Indiana) (1970–1974)
- 4th Airborne Command & Control Squadron at Ellsworth Air Force Base, (South Dakota) (1970–1991)
- 99th Air Refueling Squadron, Westover Air Force Base (Massachusetts) (1963–1970)

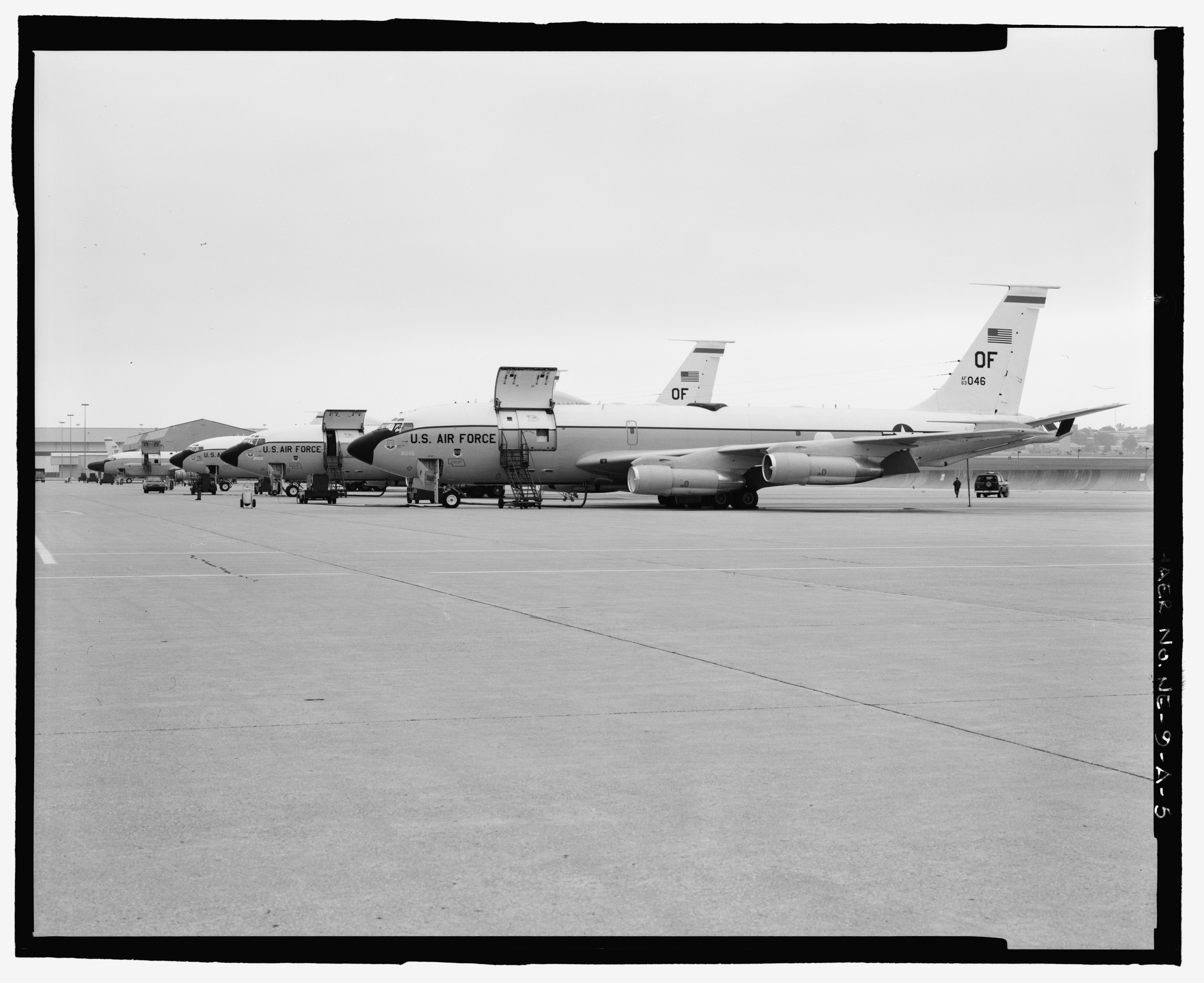
Strategic Air Command Boeing EC-135 Looking-Glass at Offutt Air Force Base, Nebraska

Other EC-135 aircraft (including EC-135A, G, and L models) supporting the Looking Glass missions (communications relay and Minuteman airborne launch control centers) were flown by the 906th Air Refueling Squadron at Minot Air Force Base (North Dakota) (1963–1970)^{1}, the 70th Air Refueling Squadron at Grissom AFB (1975–1993), and the 301st Air Refueling Squadron at Lockbourne Air Force Base (Ohio) (1963–1970). All aircraft have been retired or repurposed.

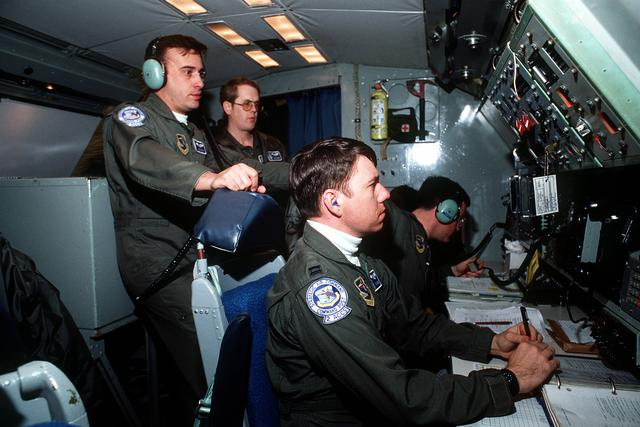
Strategic Air Command Personnel on-board the EC-135 Looking Glass

The United States nuclear strategy depends on its ability to command, control, and communicate with its nuclear forces under all conditions. An essential element of that ability is Looking Glass; its crew and staff ensure there is always an aircraft ready to direct bombers and missiles from the air should ground-based command centers be destroyed or rendered inoperable. Looking Glass is intended to guarantee that U.S. strategic forces will act only in the manner dictated by the President. It took the nickname "Looking Glass" because the mission mirrored ground-based command, control, and communications centers.

The Strategic Air Command (SAC) began the Looking Glass mission on February 3, 1961, and Looking Glass aircraft were continuously airborne 24 hours a day for over 29 years, accumulating more than 281,000 accident-free flying hours. On July 24, 1990, "The Glass" ceased continuous airborne alert, but remained on ground or airborne alert 24 hours a day. The EC-135A flew the Command Post mission until EC-135C were delivered starting in 1963. The aircraft were delivered to Offutt AFB and as well as one aircraft to each of the Stateside Numbered Air Force Headquarters – Second Air Force at Barksdale AFB (Louisiana); Eighth Air Force at Westover AFB (Massachusetts); and Fifteenth Air Force at March AFB (California). EC-135s flew all the missions except one, on March 4, 1980, when an E-4B was tested on an operational mission, flying a double sortie as the replacement aircraft could not launch due to weather. About a week after the flight, Washington deleted the funds for additional E-4 aircraft.

On June 1, 1992, SAC was inactivated and replaced by the United States Strategic Command, which now controls the Looking Glass. On October 1, 1998, the Navy's E-6 Mercury TACAMO replaced the USAF's EC-135C in the Looking Glass mission. The last active, former, Looking Glass was converted to a WC-135C Constant Phoenix, where it was retired in November 2020.

Notes

- ^1Ellsworth AFB maintained additional EC-135 aircraft on Satellite Alert at Minot AFB to monitor the North Dakota missile silos.

=== Airborne Launch Control Center ===
Airborne Launch Control Centers (ALCC—pronounced "Al-see") provided a survivable launch capability for the United States Air Force's LGM-30 Minuteman Intercontinental Ballistic Missile (ICBM) force by utilizing the Airborne Launch Control System (ALCS) on board that is operated by an airborne missileer crew. Historically, from 1967 to 1998, the ALCC mission was performed by United States Air Force Boeing EC-135 command post aircraft. This included EC-135A, EC-135C, EC-135G, and EC-135L aircraft.

In the late 1960s and early 1970s, ALCS crews belonged to the 44th Strategic Missile Wing (SMW) at Ellsworth AFB and the 91st SMW at Minot AFB. ALCS equipment was installed on various Boeing EC-135 variants to include the EC-135A, EC-135C, EC-135G, and for a short while on the EC-135L.

Starting in 1970, there were only two SAC squadrons that operated ALCS capable aircraft. This included the 2nd Airborne Command and Control Squadron (ACCS) operating EC-135C aircraft out of Offutt AFB and the 4th ACCS operating EC-135A, EC-135C, and EC-135G aircraft out of Ellsworth AFB . All three variants of these EC-135A/C/G aircraft had ALCS equipment installed on board.

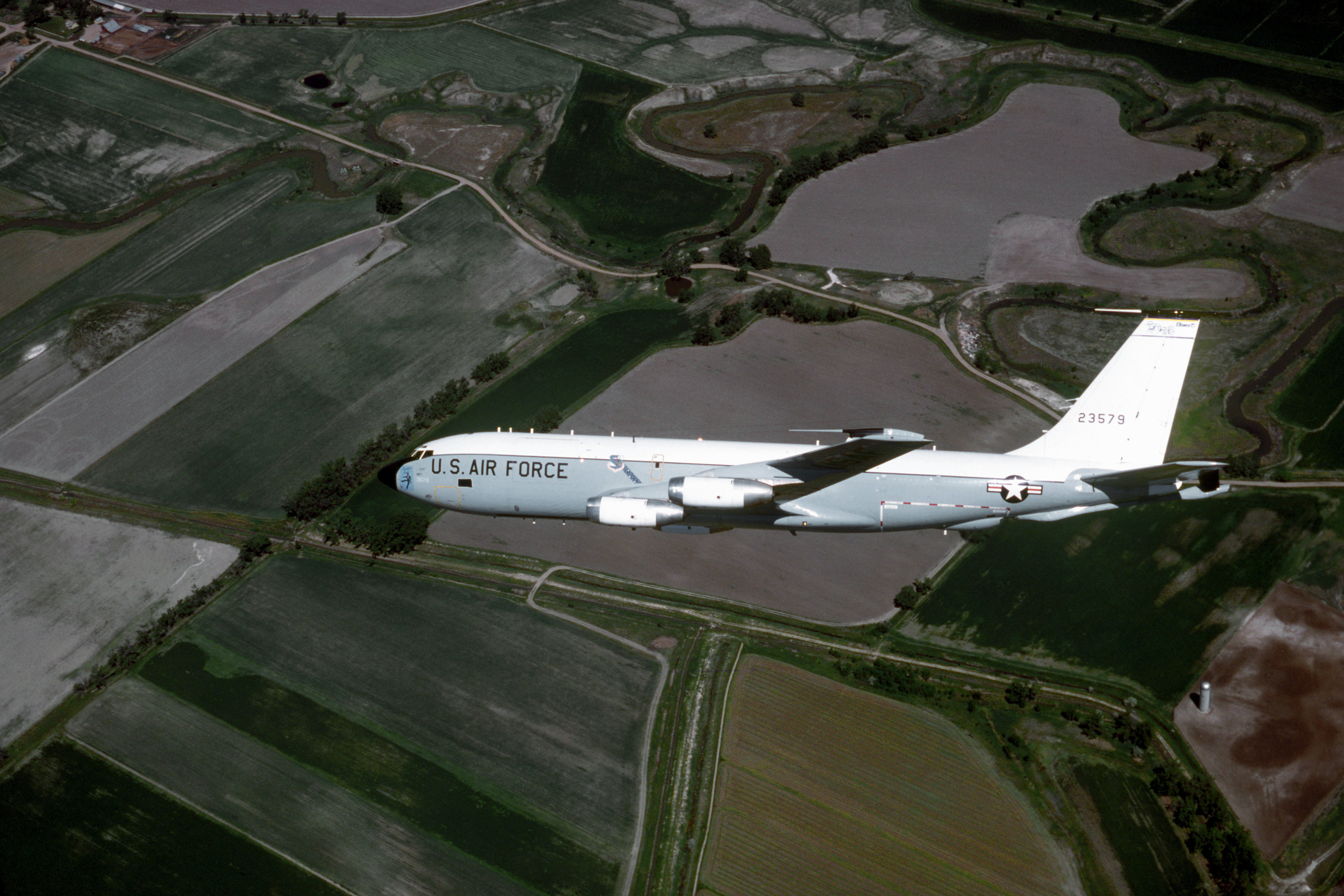
EC-135A ALCC

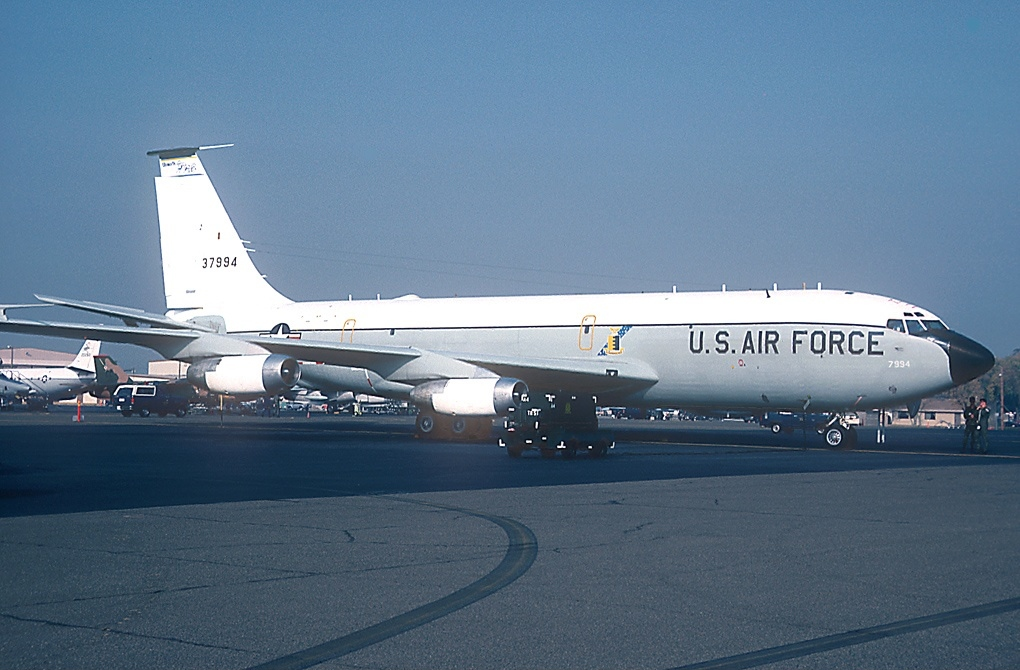
EC-135G at Ellsworth AFB in South Dakota

The 4th ACCS was the workhorse of ALCS operations. Three dedicated Airborne Launch Control Centers (ALCC) were on ground alert around-the-clock providing ALCS coverage for five of the six Minuteman ICBM Wings. These dedicated ALCCs were mostly EC-135A aircraft but could also have been EC-135C or EC-135G aircraft depending on availability. ALCC No. 1 was on ground alert at Ellsworth AFB and during a wartime scenario would have taken off and orbited between the Minuteman Wings at Ellsworth AFB and F.E. Warren AFB (Wyoming) providing ALCS assistance if needed. ALCCs No. 2 and No. 3 were routinely on forward deployed ground alert at Minot AFB. During a wartime scenario, ALCC No. 3 would have orbited between the Minuteman ICBM Wings at Minot AFB and Grand Forks AFB, both in North Dakota, providing ALCS assistance if needed. ALCC No. 2 was dedicated to orbiting near the Minuteman ICBM Wing at Malmstrom AFB (Montana) providing ALCS assistance if needed. The 4th ACCS also maintained an EC-135C or EC-135G on ground alert at Ellsworth AFB as the West Auxiliary Airborne Command Post (WESTAUXCP) as a backup to SAC's "Looking Glass" Airborne Command Post (ABNCP) as well as a radio relay link between the Looking Glass and ALCCs when airborne. Although equipped with ALCS, the WESTAUXCP did not have a dedicated Minuteman ICBM wing to provide ALCS assistance to.

The 2nd ACCS was another major player in ALCS operations. The primary mission of the 2nd ACCS was to fly the SAC ABNCP "Looking Glass" aircraft in continuous airborne operations. However, due to its proximity in orbiting over the central United States, the airborne Looking Glass provided ALCS coverage for the Minuteman ICBM Wing located at Whiteman AFB (Missouri). Not only did Whiteman AFB have Minuteman II ICBMs, but it also had ERCS configured Minuteman missiles on alert. The 2nd ACCS also had an additional EC-135C on ground alert at Offutt AFB as the EASTAUXCP, providing backup to the airborne Looking Glass, radio relay capability, and a means for the Commander in Chief of SAC to escape an enemy nuclear attack. Although the EASTAUXCP was ALCS capable, it did not have a dedicated ALCS mission.

=== Silk Purse ===
Operation Silk Purse program provided four EC-135H command post aircraft to the Commander, U.S. European Command (USEUCOM), which were based at RAF Mildenhall in the United Kingdom. Flown by the 10th Airborne Command and Control Squadron 1970–91. Onboard secure/non-secure communications and avionics equipment was maintained by the 513th Avionics Maintenance Squadron and the 2147th Communications Squadron. Aircraft S/Ns 61–0282, 285, 286 and 291.

=== Scope Light ===
Operation Scope Light provided five EC-135C/HJ/P command post aircraft to the Commander in Chief, U.S. Atlantic Command (CINCLANT), which were based at Langley AFB (Virginia). Operated by the 6th Airborne Command and Control Squadron 1972–92.

=== Blue Eagle ===
Operation Blue Eagle provided five EC-135J/P command post aircraft to the Commander in Chief, U.S. Pacific Command (USCINCPAC), which were based at Hickam AFB (Hawaii). Operated by the 9th Airborne Command and Control Squadron 1969–92. Communications, secure/unsecure voice and teletype, handled by the 1957th Communications Group, Hickam AFB (1969–1992)

"Upkeep" was the call sign for the EC135 flying in southeast Asia during 1969 to 1971, based out of Hickam AFB. It was under the direction of PACAF of which 5th AF in Fuchu AS, Tokyo Japan handled their voice communications both unsecure and secure. <1956 Comm Gp USAF 1969 to 1971>

Blue Eagle Ground Stations were located at Hickam AFB, Yakoto AB (Japan) Kadena AB (Okinawa), and Clark AB (Philippines). There may have been an additional Ground Station on Guam.

At Kadena AB, the 1962nd Communications Group hosted the Blue Eagle Ground Station. The call sign for the Kadena Blue Eagle Operation was "Settler".

All Blue Eagle Ground Stations were contracted to Philco Corporation and consisted of two trailer vans that could be pulled by a single tractor. One van was configured with a 15KW diesel powered generator and diesel fuel tank and the other was outfitted with a 15-ton heavy duty air conditioning unit, three motor generators, three UHF/VHF FM transmitters and receivers, two multiplexers each providing up to 24 telephone lines and a dedicated, individual telephone line provided to the aircraft.

The ground stations were self sufficient in that they were configured in trailers so they could be relocated to safer positions in the event of a national emergency. The equipment installed in the vans was identical to the electronics on board the aircraft. This necessitated the requirement for motor-generators to provide conversion from 60 Hz to 400 Hz power.

Each equipment van had an omni-directional antenna mounted on the roof of the van and 3 additional portable antennas that were deployed on telephone poles. The antennas could be switched electro-mechanically from each transmitter/receiver pair. The vans at Kadena AB were never moved from their initial installation location.

Blue Eagle was formed in 1965 and started 24/7 operation in October 1965 and continued until disbanded in 1992.

=== Nightwatch ===
Operation Nightwatch provided three EC-135J command post aircraft to the President of the United States which were based at Andrews AFB (Maryland). All three aircraft were transferred to other ABNCP missions.

Nightwatch was initiated in the mid-1960s utilizing the three EC-135J aircraft, modified from KC-135Bs, as command post aircraft. The three Nightwatch aircraft were ready to fly the President and the National Command Authority (NCA) out of Washington in the event of a nuclear attack. The E-4 aircraft (a modified Boeing 747-200) came on line with the Nightwatch program in 1974 replacing the EC-135s on this mission.

=== USCENTCOM Support ===
The 310th Airlift Squadron, part of the 6th Air Mobility Wing at MacDill AFB (Florida), operated two NKC-135s that were reconfigured as EC-135Y aircraft from 1989 to 2003 as executive transport and command & control platforms to support the Commander, United States Central Command. These aircraft have since been replaced with three C-37A Gulfstream V aircraft.

=== Advanced Range Instrumentation Aircraft ===
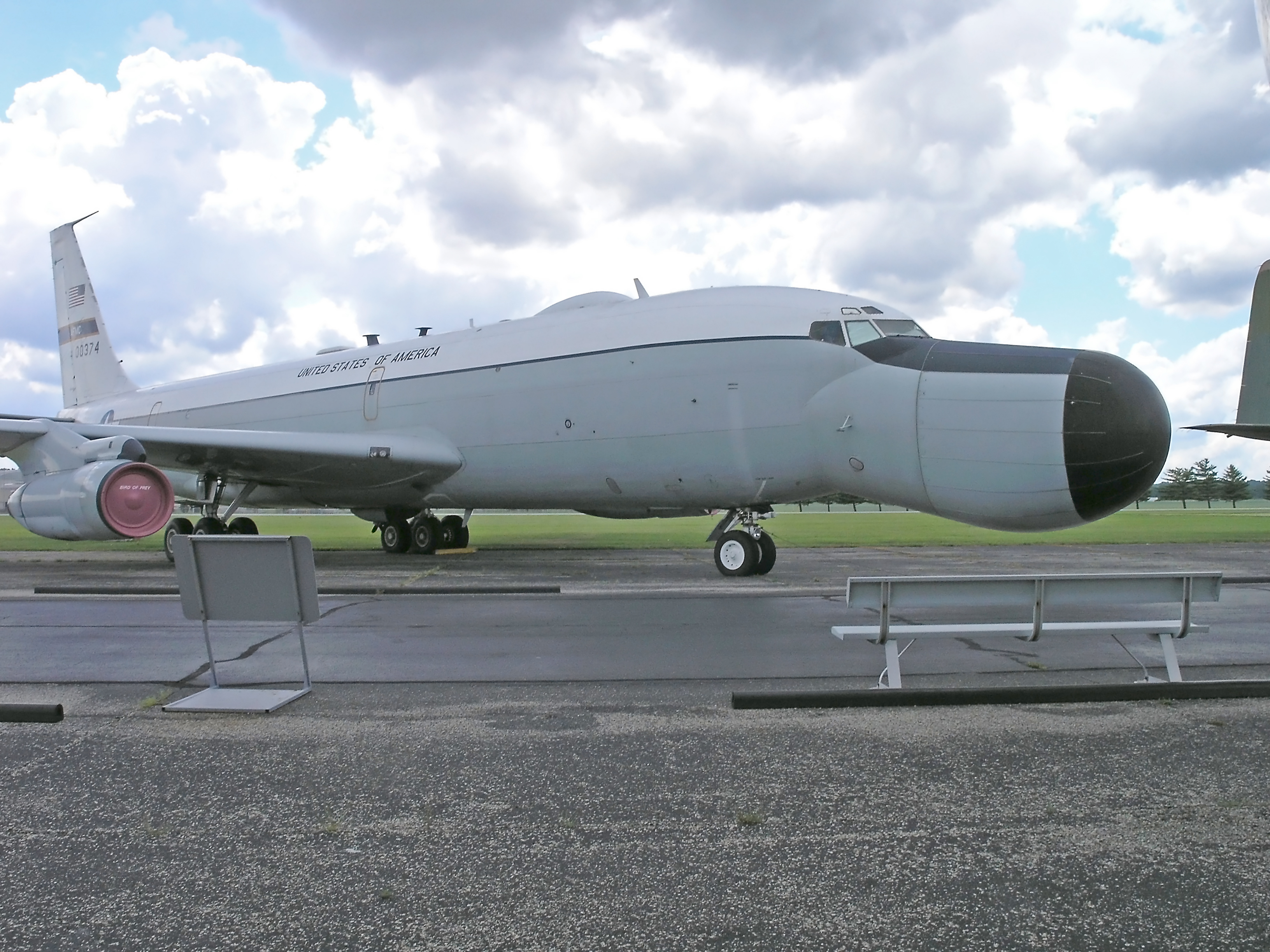
EC-135E "Droop Snoot" on display at USAF Museum

The Advanced Range Instrumentation Aircraft are EC-135Bs, modified C-135B cargo aircraft and EC-18B (former American Airlines 707-320) passenger aircraft that provided tracking and telemetry information to support the US space program in the late 1960s and early 1970s.

During the early 1960s, NASA and the Department of Defense (DoD) needed a very mobile tracking and telemetry platform to support the Apollo space program and other unmanned space flight operations. In a joint project, NASA and the DoD contracted with the McDonnell Douglas and the Bendix Corporations to modify eight Boeing C-135 Stratolifter cargo aircraft into EC-135N Apollo / Range Instrumentation Aircraft (A/RIA). Equipped with a steerable seven-foot antenna dish in its distinctive "Droop Snoot" or "Snoopy Nose", the EC-135N A/RIA became operational in January 1968, and was often known as the "Jimmy Durante" of the Air Force. The Air Force Eastern Test Range (AFETR) at Patrick AFB, Florida, maintained and operated the A/RIA until the end of the Apollo program in 1972, when the USAF renamed it the Advanced Range Instrumentation Aircraft (ARIA).

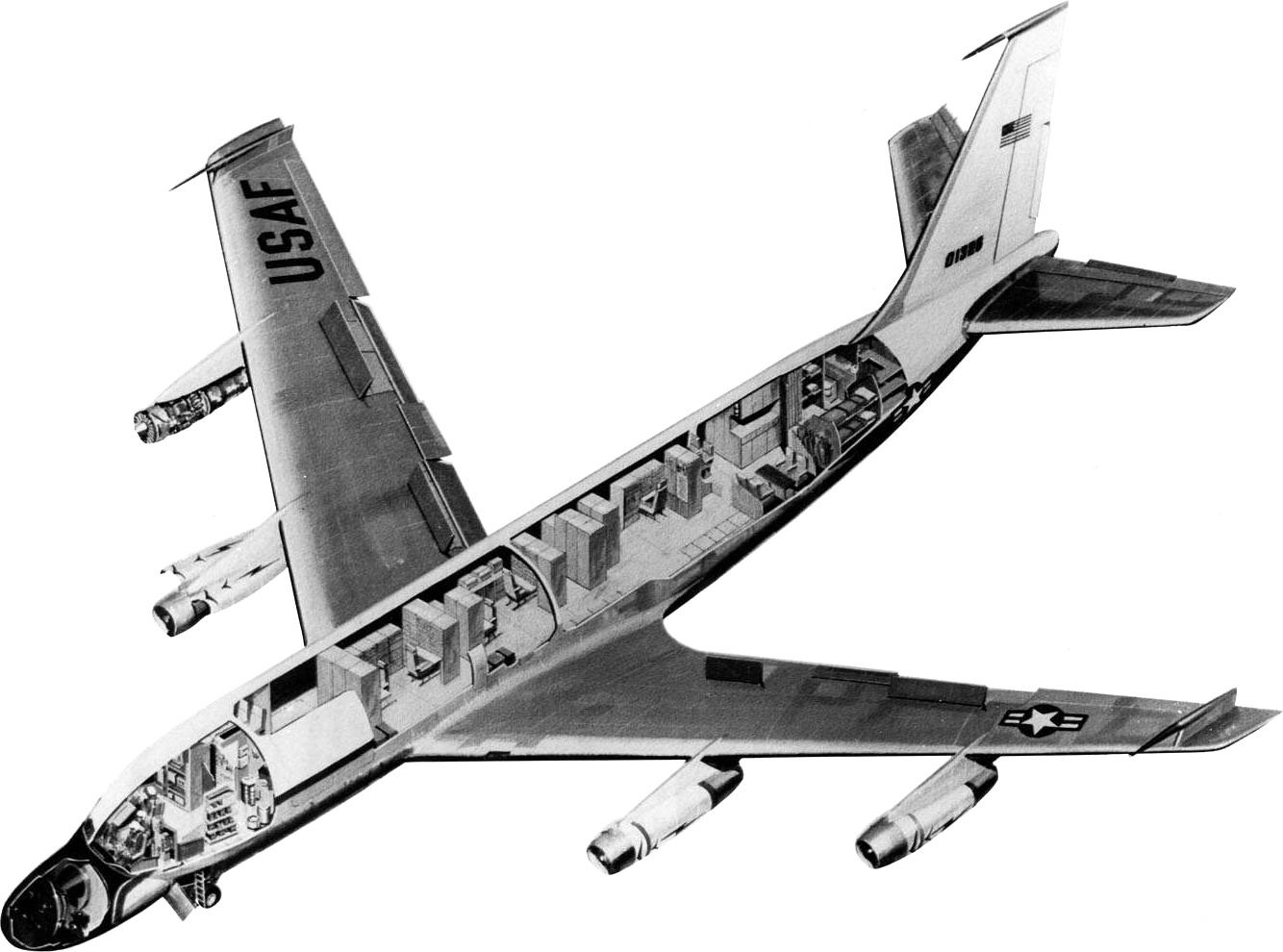
Cutaway layout of an EC-135N

Since Patrick AFB was located on the Atlantic Ocean, salt water and salt air-induced corrosion issues and associated aircraft maintenance challenges were problematic for the ARIA while based there. Transferred to the 4950th Test Wing at Wright-Patterson AFB, Ohio, in December 1975 as part of an overall consolidation of large test and evaluation aircraft, the ARIA fleet underwent numerous conversions, including a re-engining that changed the EC-135N to the EC-135E. In 1994, the ARIA fleet relocated again to Edwards AFB, California, as part of the 412th Test Wing. However, taskings for the ARIA dwindled because of high costs and improved satellite technology, and the USAF transferred the aircraft to other programs such as E-8 J-STARS.

Over its thirty-two year career, the ARIA supported the United States space program, gathered telemetry, verified international treaties, and supported cruise missile, ballistic missile defense tests, and the Space Shuttle. ARIA aircraft were equipped to collect data from the Sonobuoy Missile Impact Location System (SMILS) composed of a large sonobuoy field and a fixed bottom transponder. Specially equipped Navy P-3 aircraft were also equipped to collect data from this system which supported the Navy's fleet ballistic missile programs testing.

== Variant summary ==
- EC-135A – KC-135A modified for airborne national command post role. Later performed Airborne Launch Control Center mission with the Airborne Launch Control System.
- EC-135B – C-135B modified with large nose for ARIA mission
- EC-135C – re-designated KC-135B to EC-135C for airborne command post role, "Looking Glass"
- EC-135E – re-engined EC-135N, "Advanced Range Instrumentation Aircraft" or "ARIA"
- EC-135G – KC-135A modified for airborne national command post role. Later performed Airborne Launch Control Center mission with the Airborne Launch Control System.
- EC-135H – KC-135A modified for airborne national command post role, "Silk Purse"
- EC-135J – KC-135B modified for airborne national command post role, "Nightwatch"
- EC-135K – KC-135A modified for deployment control duties, "Head Dancer"
- EC-135L – KC-135A modified for radio relay and amplitude modulation dropout capability "Cover All"
- EC-135N – ARIA aircraft with the so-called "droop snoot" radome housing a large parabolic telemetry gathering antenna.
- EC-135J/P – KC-135A modified for airborne command post role, "Blue Eagle" and "Scope Light"
- EC-135Y – NKC-135 reconfigured as C3 aircraft for Commander-in-Chief, United States Central Command

== Accidents ==
- On 13 June 1971, USAF EC-135N, (AF Serial Number 61-0331), of 4950th Test Wing, Space and Missile Systems Organization (SAMSO), Wright-Patterson AFB disappeared while en route from Pago Pago, American Samoa to Hickam AFB in Hawaii after monitoring the French atmospheric nuclear test Encelade conducted on the previous day over Moruroa atoll. The aircraft disappeared about 70 miles south of Hawaii near Palmyra Island. Twelve military personnel and twelve civilians died. Cause of the mishap is unknown. Only small bits of wreckage were found.
- On 14 September 1977, USAF EC-135K, (AF Serial Number 62-3536), crashed on takeoff from Kirtland Air Force Base, NM for a Higher-Headquarters Directed (HHD) mission. After a long crew duty period, the crew started its takeoff roll at a few minutes prior to midnight. The aircraft impacted the ground 8 km (5 miles) east of the departure base because it lacked sufficient power to either climb above or turn to avoid rapidly rising terrain in that area. All 20 occupants of this Tactical Air Command (TAC) operated aircraft were killed in the crash and subsequent fire at about 8,500 feet up the Manzano Mountain Range east of Albuquerque, NM.
- On 2 January 1980, USAF EC-135P, (AF Serial Number 58-0007), was destroyed on the ground at Langley AFB when an electrical short occurred in the water injection tank heater wiring on the J-57-P/F-59W equipped aircraft. There were no injuries as the Tactical Air Command (TAC) aircraft was unoccupied at the time of the mishap.
- On 6 May 1981, USAF EC-135N, (AF Serial Number 61-0328), crashed during a scheduled Advanced Range Instrumented Aircraft (ARIA) navigator and Primary Mission Electronic Equipment (PMEE) training mission from Wright-Patterson Air Force Base, OH. For an unexplained reason, the aircraft pitch trim was moved to the full nose-down position, which exceeded the ability of the autopilot to control, and the aircraft pitched over abruptly. The abrupt pitch over caused the generators to trip off line and the loss of AC electrical power prevented the pitch trim from being operated normally. The aircraft became uncontrollable and exploded at about 1,500 ft MSL. The crash occurred near Walkersville, Maryland at 10:50L. All seventeen crew members and four passengers on board the aircraft were killed.
- On 29 May 1992, USAF EC-135J, (AF Serial Number 62-3584), landed long at Pope AFB (North Carolina) and overshot the runway. The undercarriage collapsed and the fuselage broke in two. Although none of the 14 occupants were seriously injured, the aircraft was written off as damaged beyond repair and the remains were removed to Davis-Monthan AFB (Arizona) for disposal.
- On 2 September 1997, USAF EC-135C, (AF Serial Number 63-8053), was heavily damaged on landing at Pope AFB when the nose wheel collapsed. None of the 11 occupants was injured significantly, but the Air Combat Command (ACC) aircraft was 32 years and 10 months old at the time of the accident and was written off as damaged beyond repair.

== Aircraft on display ==
- 60-0374 The Bird of Prey – EC-135E (originally built as a C-135A, later converted to EC-135N) on static display at the National Museum of the United States Air Force at Wright-Patterson Air Force Base in Dayton, Ohio. The aircraft is a former Advanced Range Instrumented Aircraft (ARIA) designated as an EC-135N model with J57-59 engines, and is displayed in the museum's outside Air Park; nose art remains. The aircraft was flown to the museum on November 3, 2000, by a flight crew from the Air Force Flight Test Center (AFFTC), and was delivered with full Prime Mission Electronic Equipment intact.
- 61-0262 Rollin' Thunder – EC-135A (originally built as a KC-135A) on static display at the South Dakota Air and Space Museum in Box Elder, South Dakota; nose art remains. It was last assigned to the 4th Airborne Command and Control Squadron (4th ACCS), 28th Bomb Wing at Ellsworth.
- 61-0269 Excaliber – EC-135L (originally built as a KC-135A) on static display at the Grissom Air Museum near Peru, Indiana. The aircraft was last assigned to the 305th Air Refueling Wing and retired in 1992, at the end of the Cold War. It was delivered to the Air Force on 8 December 1961. Assigned to Grissom AFB in 1970, the aircraft flew many missions during Operation Just Cause, Operation Desert Shield and Desert Storm. For the latter, it performed radio relay operations leading to the elimination of two Iraqi aircraft, over 60 tank kills, and 27 Scud missile strikes.
- 61-0287 – EC-135A Airborne Launch Control Center/radio relay link aircraft (originally built as a KC-135A) on static display at Zorinsky Memorial Air Park at Offutt Air Force Base in Bellevue, Nebraska.
- 61-0327 – on static display at the Museum of Aviation, Robins AFB
- 63-8049 – EC-135C (originally built as a KC-135B), on display at the Strategic Air Command & Aerospace Museum in Ashland, Nebraska.
- 63-8057 – EC-135J (originally built as a KC-135B) on static display at the Pima Air and Space Museum in Tucson, Arizona.

== See also ==
- Airborne Launch Control System
- Airborne Launch Control Center
- Post Attack Command and Control System
- Operation Looking Glass
- Emergency Rocket Communications System
- 2d Airborne Command and Control Squadron
