= William Armstrong (pilot) =

African-American pilot (1924–1945)

Flight Officer William Armstrong
- Armstrong in 1944
- Born: William Pickney Armstrong; October 30, 1924; Providence, Rhode Island, US
- Died: April 1, 1945 (aged 20); Austria
- Burial place: Grace Church Cemetery in Providence
- Military career
- Allegiance: United States
- Branch: United States Army Air Force
- Service years: 1944–1945
- Rank: Flight Officer
- Nickname: Will
- Unit: 332nd Fighter Group
- Awards: Purple Heart Medal.; Congressional Gold Medal (2007) (posthumously); Presidential Unit Citation

William Pinkney Armstrong (October 30, 1924 – April 1, 1945) † was a World War II flight officer and a member the Tuskegee Airmen. His plane was shot down on Easter Sunday in 1945 over Austria. In 2018 he was inducted into the Rhode Island Aviation Hall of Fame.

== Military service ==
=== World War II ===
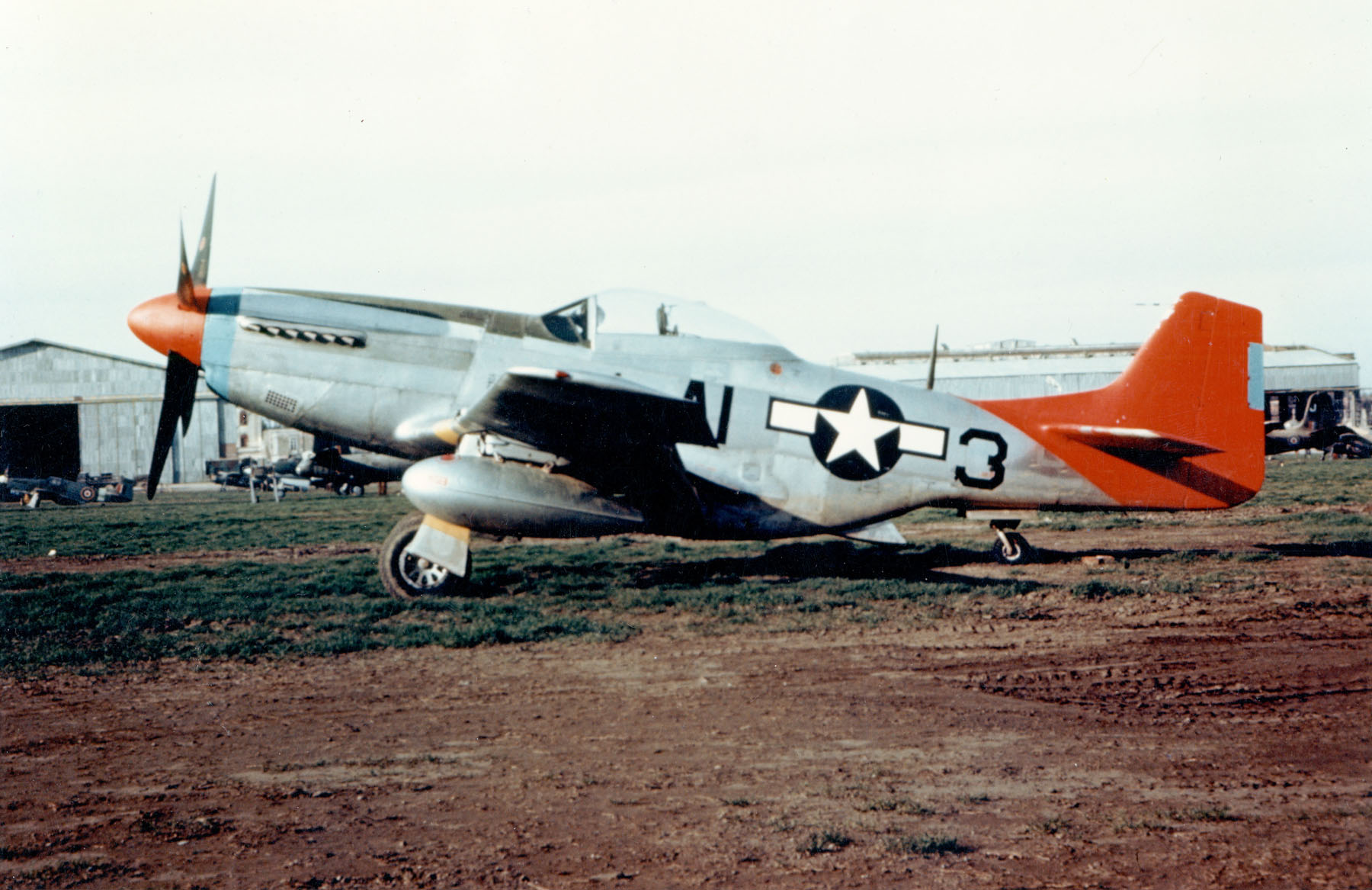
The Tuskegee Airmen's aircraft had distinctive markings that led to the name, "Red Tails." (Note: The red markings that distinguished the Tuskegee Airmen included red bands on the noses of P-51s as well as a red rudder; their P-51B and D Mustangs flew with similar color schemes, with red propeller spinners, yellow wing bands and all-red tail surfaces.)

After his graduation (September 8, 1944) from the Tuskegee Institute in Alabama he was assigned to the 301st Fighter Squadron, 332nd fighter group in Ramitelli, Italy. Armstrong flew missions escorting bombers to targets in Nazi territory.

On Easter Sunday April 1, 1945, he was among a group of Tuskegee airmen escorting bombers back to their base. The Tuskegee airmen were attacked by a group of German fighters and Armstrong's plane was one of two American planes shot down. His body was not recovered.

=== Dogfight ===
The Tuskegee Airmen had a successful mission escorting bombers on a bombing mission over St. Polten, Austria April 1, 1945. Returning to base, the American planes were attacked by German fighter planes. The Tuskegee airmen broke away to take on the German fighter planes. The Tuskegee airmen were able to shoot down 12 of the German fighter planes, but two P-51s were shot down. Armstrong's plane crashed into the ground, his body was not recovered. Walter Manning was able to deploy his parachute but was subsequently lynched.

=== Recovery of his body ===
After the war his stepfather petitioned the military to keep searching for William Armstrong's body. The Military found his remains buried in a grave in Austria and his body was flown back to Rhode Island in 1950.

=== Awards ===
- Air Medal
- Purple Heart Medal
- Congressional Gold Medal (2007) (posthumously)
- Presidential Unit Citation
- European-African-Middle Eastern Campaign Medal

== Education ==
- Central High School 1943
- Tuskegee Institute (1944)

== Personal life ==
He was born in Washington D.C., but he his mother Evelyn, and his sister Evelyn moved to Providence, Rhode Island where his grandfather lived. His mother married Nelson Venter. The city of Providence has erected a memorial to Armstrong in Providence Rhode Island at the intersection of Dodge and Cranston streets.

== See also ==
- Executive Order 9981
- List of Tuskegee Airmen
- Military history of African Americans
