= Leon W. Johnson =

United States Air Force general, born 1904

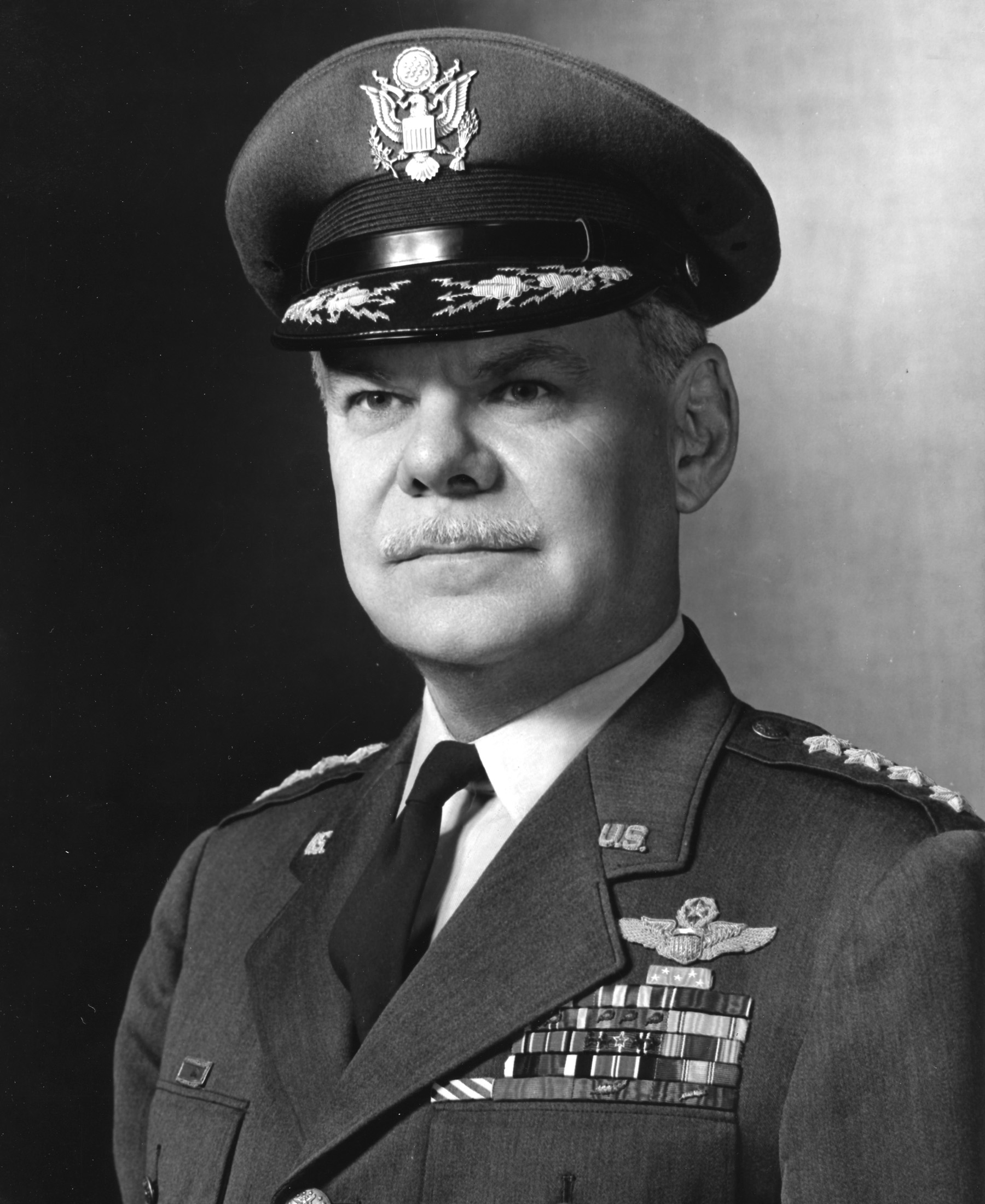
- General Leon W. Johnson
- Born: 13 September 1904; Columbia, Missouri, U.S.
- Died: 10 November 1997 (aged 93); Fairfax, Virginia, U.S.
- Burial place: Arlington National Cemetery
- Military career
- Allegiance: United States of America
- Branch: United States Air Force; United States Army Air Corps
- Service years: 1926–1965
- Rank: General
- Service number: 88A/0-16429
- Commands: Continental Air Command; Third Air Force; 3d Air Division; 14th Bombardment Wing; 44th Bombardment Group
- Conflicts: World War II
- Awards: Medal of Honor; Air Force Distinguished Service Medal (3); Silver Star; Legion of Merit; Distinguished Flying Cross (2); Air Medal (4); Legion of Honor (France) Croix de Guerre (France); Croix de Guerre (Belgium); Distinguished Flying Cross (UK)

General Leon William Johnson (13 September 1904 – 10 November 1997) was a United States Air Force general who was awarded the Medal of Honor for leading the attack on the Ploesti oil fields during World War II.

A graduate of the United States Military Academy at West Point, New York, Johnson was commissioned a second lieutenant in the infantry in 1926. He joined the United States Army Air Corps in 1929, and qualified as a pilot. He earned a Master of Science degree in meteorology from California Institute of Technology in 1936.

During World War II, Johnson was one of the first four flying officers of the Eighth Air Force, and served on it staff during its formative period at Savannah, Georgia. In 1943, he assumed command of the 44th Bombardment Group, which flew the Consolidated B-24 Liberator. Johnson led the attack on the German naval installations at Kiel in May 1943 and the attack on the Ploesti oil fields in August 1943, for which the 44th Bombardment Group received Distinguished Unit Citations. He commanded the 14th Combat Bombardment Wing from September 1943 until May 1945.

After the war, Johnson commanded the Strategic Air Command's Fifteenth Air Force. He returned to England in 1948 to lead the 3rd Air Division, and then the Third Air Force, as it was redesignated in 1951. Despite his lowly rank of major general, he was able to hold his own in dealings with more senior British officers and officials, and performed his duties with diplomacy and sensitivity. He returned to the United States in 1952 as head of the Continental Air Command. He was air deputy to the Supreme Allied Commander Europe, at SHAPE Headquarters from 1958 until he retired in 1961, but later that year he was recalled to active duty to become director of the National Security Council's Net Evaluation Subcommittee Staff at the Pentagon. He finally retired in 1965.

== Early life ==
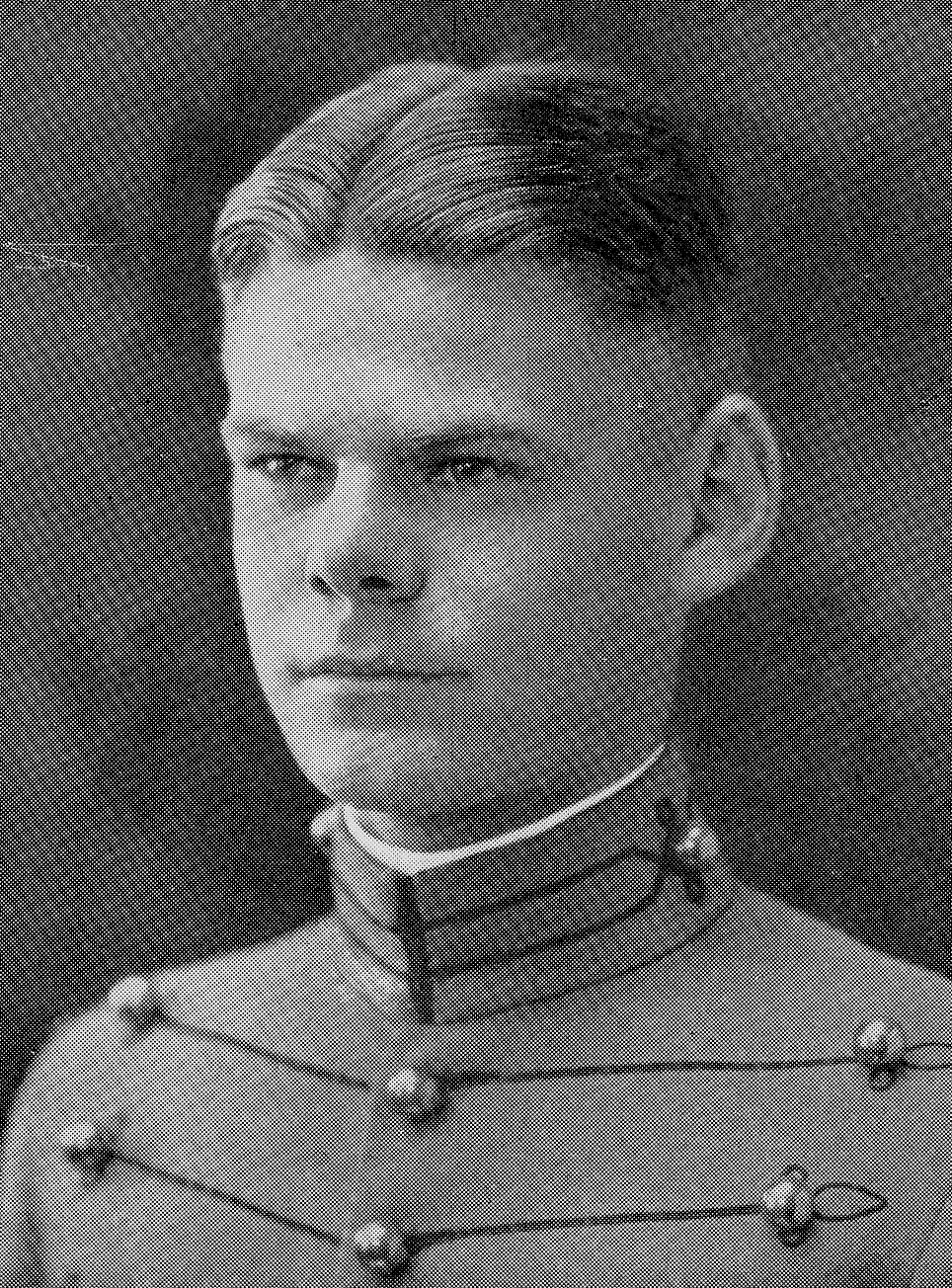
At West Point in 1926

Johnson was born in Columbia, Missouri, on 13 September 1904. He had an older brother, a younger brother, and a sister. In 1919, the family moved to Moline, Kansas, where he went to high school. He played on the high school football team as a halfback, and was vice president of his senior class. After graduation, he worked in the family's bank.

Johnson entered the United States Military Academy at West Point, New York, on 1 July 1922, and graduated 60th out of 152 graduates in the class of 1926 on 12 June 1926. In his final year, he was the First Sergeant of Company C. He was commissioned a second lieutenant in the infantry on 12 June 1926, and was posted to the 17th Infantry at Fort Crook, Nebraska, on 12 September 1926. He volunteered for service in United States Army Air Corps, and on 1 March 1929 he reported to the Air Corps Primary Flying School at Brooks Field, Texas, as a student officer. He married Lucille Taylor before completion of flight training. They had two daughters, Sue and Sarah. He was next sent to Kelly Field, Texas, for further training with the Observation Section from 15 October 1929 to 28 February 1930.

On 1 March 1930, Johnson joined the 5th Observation Squadron at Mitchel Field, New York, as its adjutant and engineering officer, and was promoted to first lieutenant on 1 December 1931. On 15 June 1932 he joined the 2d Observation Squadron at Nichols Field in the Philippines. He returned to the United States in July 1935, and on 30 July 1935 he entered the California Institute of Technology, from which he received a Master of Science degree in meteorology on 1 July 1936. He was promoted to captain on 13 June 1936. He was then posted to Barksdale Field, Louisiana, as operations officer until 1 July 1937, when he became commander of the 3rd Weather Squadron, and was a student at the Air Corps Tactical School from 5 June to 25 August 1939.

== World War II ==
Johnson was operations officer of the 3d Bombardment Group at Barksdale Field from 15 July 1940 to 12 September 1940, and then its weather officer until 27 December 1940. The group moved to Savannah Army Air Base on 6 October 1940, and he was promoted to major on 16 November 1940. He became commander of the group's 90th Bombardment Squadron on 16 December 1940, and then its 10th Reconnaissance Squadron on 9 May 1941. He became operations officer (A-3) of the III Air Support Command when it was activated in September 1941.

Johnson was one of the first four flying officers of the Eighth Air Force and served as assistant chief of staff for operations (A-3) during its formative period at Savannah, Georgia. With the United States now a belligerent in World War II, promotion accelerated, and he was promoted to lieutenant colonel on 5 January 1942, and then colonel on 1 March 1942. He accompanied the Eighth Air Force to England in June 1942.

On 8 January 1943, Johnson assumed command of the 44th Bombardment Group, flying the Consolidated B-24 Liberator. It flew bombing missions against a variety of targets. On 14 May 1943, Johnson led 17 B-24s from the 44th Bombardment Group which, along with 109 Boeing B-17 Flying Fortresses, attacked the German naval installations at Kiel, the most distant target attacked by the Eighth Air Force up to that time. The B-24, carrying incendiaries, came under particularly heavy attack from German fighters, as they were unable to stay close enough the B-17s to be protected by their gunfire, and had to open up their own formation to attack; five of the eight aircraft shot down were B-24s. For this raid the 44th Bombardment Group received a Distinguished Unit Citation.

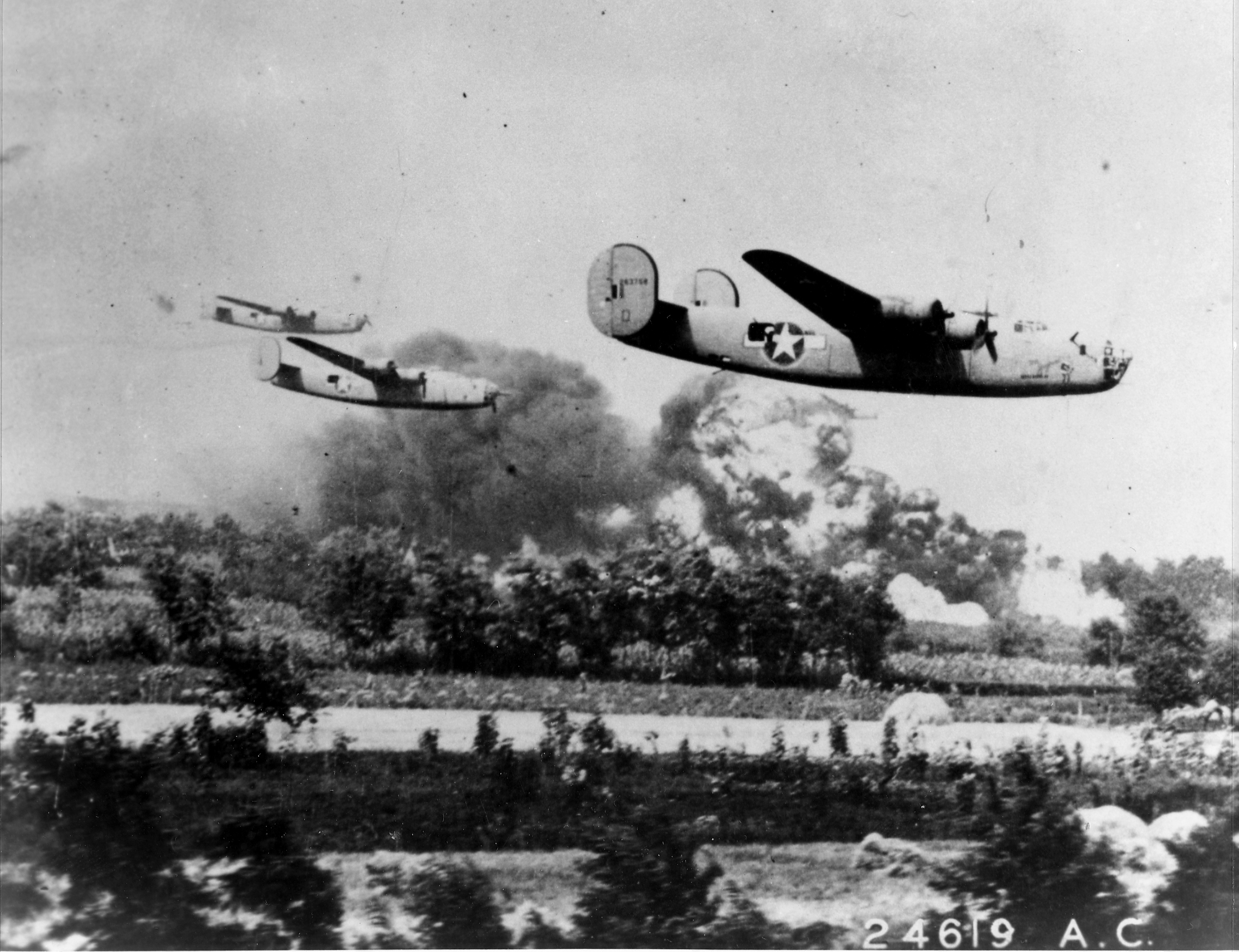
B-24s over Ploesti in the attack on the Ploesti oil fields

The 44th Bombardment Group took part in an even more costly raid, the attack on the Romanian Ploesti oil fields, on 1 August 1943. When Johnson arrived at the target leading his group, he found that the 93d Bombardment Group had already attacked their target by mistake, and as a consequence, the defenders were alert. Although he would have been justified in turning back, Johnson led his group in through thick smoke, flak and explosions that concealed the tall smokestacks and barrage balloon cables. On the way home, they had to fight off Bf 109 fighters.

Johnson's own plane was charred black by the flames, and hit by flak several times but managed to return safely. In all, 54 of the 177 aircraft involved in the raid were lost, along with 532 of the 1,725 crewmen. Although 42 percent of the refining capacity was destroyed, the Germans were able to soon restore production. The 44th Bombardment Group received a second Distinguished Unit Citation. For his part in that raid, Johnson was awarded the Medal of Honor.

In addition, for his leadership of the 44th Bombardment Group, Johnson was awarded the Legion of Merit, the Silver Star, two Distinguished Flying Crosses and four Air Medals. commanded the 14th Combat Bombardment Wing from 3 September 1943 until 10 May 1945. He was promoted to brigadier general on 6 November 1943.

== Post World War II ==
After V-E Day, he was Chief of Personnel Services at Headquarters, Army Air Forces, in Washington, DC, from 28 June 1945 to 15 May 1946. He then became deputy to the assistant chief of Air Staff for Personnel from 16 May 1946 to 28 April 1947. He was commander of the Strategic Air Command's Fifteenth Air Force at Colorado Springs, Colorado, from 1 May 1947 to 2 August 1948, with the rank of major general from 27 October 1947. The Air Force returned to England for the first time since World War II when Johnson organized the 3rd Air Division there on 20 August 1948. The division provided facilities for maintenance and support of Strategic Air Command aircraft on rotational training missions to Europe and for transport aircraft used in the Berlin Airlift. It was redesignated the Third Air Force on 1 May 1951. In addition to his other duties, chief of the Military Assistance Advisory Group for the United Kingdom.

As commander of the 3rd Air Division and later the Third Air Force, he was subordinate to United States Air Forces in Europe, but also had to deal with USAF headquarters and the Strategic Air Command. He was also designated the point of contact for dealing with the British government. Despite his lowly rank of major general, he was able to hold his own in dealings with more senior British officers, and with senior British officials, including the prime minister of the United Kingdom, Clement Attlee. His command was understaffed, lacked a clear mission, and there was no agreement with the British government regarding base rights or financial responsibilities. Nor was it easy dealing with his Strategic Air Command colleagues like Archie J. Old Jr., who were not renowned for diplomatic skill. Johnson's deft touch was perhaps exemplified by his order that the Royal Air Force Ensign be flown over US bases in the UK alongside the flag of the United States.

On 21 February 1952, he was named commander of the Continental Air Command at Mitchel Air Force Base, New York. From July 1953, he was concurrently U.S. Air Force Representative to the United Nations Military Staff Committee. He was U.S. Representative to the NATO Military Committee, Military Representatives Committee, and NATO Standing Group, stationed in Washington, D.C., from April 1956 until May 1958, when he became air deputy to the Supreme Allied Commander Europe, at SHAPE Headquarters in Paris, France. He retired on 31 July 1961, but on 15 September 1961 he was recalled to active duty to become director of the National Security Council's Net Evaluation Subcommittee Staff at the Pentagon. He retired a second time on 30 April 1965.

== Death and legacy ==
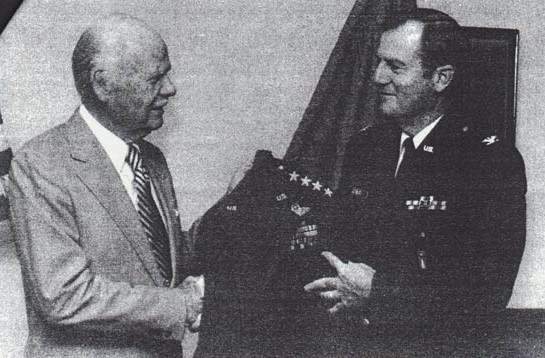
Johnson donating his uniform to Col. Robert Ceruti, commander of the 44th Strategic Missile Wing, at a ceremony held at Ellsworth Air Force Base (1983)

Johnson settled in McLean, Virginia and worked as a consultant. His hobbies included growing flowers, and he was president of the National Capitol Dahlia Society. He was interviewed for The World at War.

He died of a respiratory infection on 10 November 1997 at Belvoir Woods health care facility in Fairfax, Virginia, and was buried in Arlington National Cemetery next to his wife, Lucille Taylor Johnson, who had died in 1983. He was survived by his two daughters, Sarah Abbott and Sue Vandenberg, who had married Hoyt S. Vandenberg Jr., the son of General Hoyt S. Vandenberg. Of Johnson's Medal of Honor, war correspondent Andy Rooney wrote in 1995 that "no infantryman deserved it more than this good and brave Air Force general."

In 2008, Johnson's grandson, Leon Abbott, donated the medal to the U.S. Army Heritage and Education Center in Carlisle, Pennsylvania, which holds a large collection of material relating to the 44th Bombardment Group. "There's a book by Tom Wolfe, The Right Stuff", Abbott recalled. "I do feel my grandfather had the right stuff."

== Medal of Honor citation ==
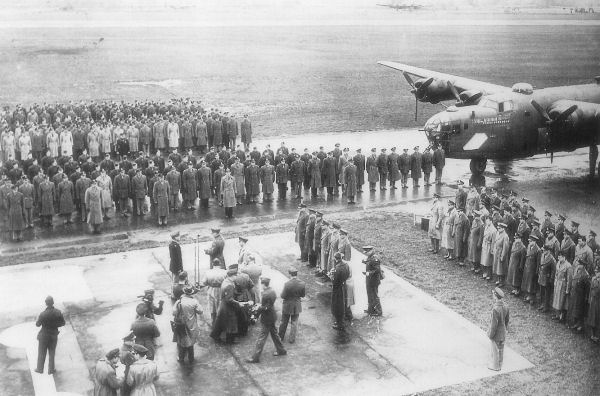
Johnson receiving his Medal of Honor from Lieutenant General Jacob L. Devers in a ceremony at RAF Shipdham

=== Medal of Honor citation ===
Rank and organization: Colonel, U.S. Army Air Corps, 44th Bomber Group, 9th Air Force. Place and date: Ploesti Raid, Rumania, 1 August 1943. Entered service at: Moline, Kans. Born: 13 September 1904, Columbia, Mo. G.O. No.: 54, 7 September 1943.

For conspicuous gallantry in action and intrepidity at the risk of his life above and beyond the call of duty on 1 August 1943. Col. Johnson, as commanding officer of a heavy bombardment group, led the formation of the aircraft of his organization constituting the fourth element of the mass low-level bombing attack of the 9th U.S. Air Force against the vitally important enemy target of the Ploesti oil refineries. While proceeding to the target on this 2,400-mile flight, his element became separated from the leading elements of the mass formation in maintaining the formation of the unit while avoiding dangerous cumulous cloud conditions encountered over mountainous territory. Though temporarily lost, he reestablished contact with the third element and continued on the mission with this reduced force to the prearranged point of attack, where it was discovered that the target assigned to Col. Johnson's group had been attacked and damaged by a preceding element. Though having lost the element of surprise upon which the safety and success of such a daring form of mission in heavy bombardment aircraft so strongly depended, Col. Johnson elected to carry out his planned low-level attack despite the thoroughly alerted defenses, the destructive antiaircraft fire, enemy fighter airplanes, the imminent danger of exploding delayed action bombs from the previous element, of oil fires and explosions, and of intense smoke obscuring the target. By his gallant courage, brilliant leadership, and superior flying skill, Col. Johnson so led his formation as to destroy totally the important refining plants and installations which were the object of his mission. Col. Johnson's personal contribution to the success of this historic raid, and the conspicuous gallantry in action, and intrepidity at the risk of his life above and beyond the call of duty demonstrated by him on this occasion constitute such deeds of valor and distinguished service as have during our Nation's history formed the finest traditions of our Armed Forces.

== Awards and decorations ==

Badge	Command Pilot Badge		
1st row	Medal of Honor	Air Force Distinguished Service Medal with two oak leaf clusters	Silver Star
2nd row	Legion of Merit	Distinguished Flying Cross with oak leaf cluster	Air Medal with three oak leaf clusters
3rd row	Air Force Presidential Unit Citation with oak leaf cluster	American Defense Service Medal	American Campaign Medal
4th row	European-African-Middle-Eastern Campaign Medal with nine campaign stars	World War Two Victory Medal	Army of Occupation Medal with Germany Clasp and Berlin Airlift Device
5th row	Medal for Humane Action with Berlin Airlift Device	National Defense Service Medal with service star	Air Force Longevity Service Award with seven oak leaf clusters

Foreign Awards

Distinguished Flying Cross United Kingdom
Legion of Honor France	French Croix De Guerre with Palm	Belgian Croix De Guerre with Palm

== Dates of rank ==
Insignia	Rank	Component	Dates	Source
	Second Lieutenant	Infantry	12 June 1926	
	Second Lieutenant	Air Corps	1 March 1929	
	First Lieutenant	Air Corps	1 December 1931	
	Captain (temporary)	Air Corps	15 March 1935	
	Captain	Air Corps	13 June 1936	
	Major (temporary)	Air Corps	16 November 1940	
	Major	Army of the United States	31 January 1941	
	Lieutenant Colonel (temporary)	Army of the United States	5 January 1942	
	Lieutenant Colonel	Army of the United States	1 February 1942	
	Colonel	Army of the United States	1 March 1942	
	Major	Air Corps	12 June 1943	
	Brigadier General	Army of the United States	6 November 1943	
	Major General	Air Force of the United States	27 October 1947	
	Colonel	United States Air Force	2 April 1948	
	Brigadier General	United States Air Force	11 June 1948 (backdated to 25 March 1946)	
	Major General	United States Air Force	11 August 1950 (backdated to 2 April 1945)	
	Lieutenant General	United States Air Force	5 July 1952	
	General	United States Air Force	31 August 1957	
