= Walter Manning =

African-American pilot and veteran (1920–1945)

Walter P. Manning
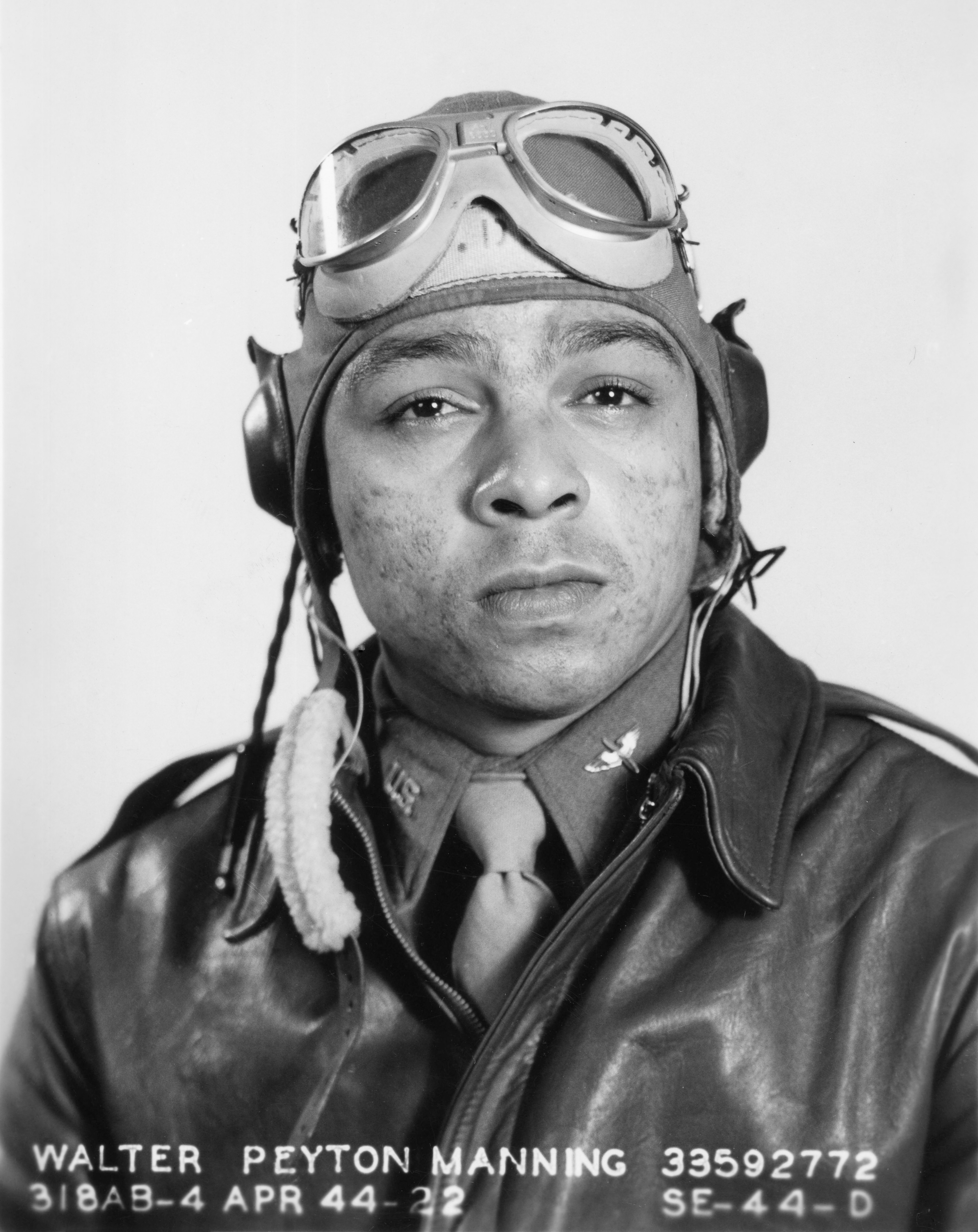
- Walter Manning in 1944
- Born: Walter Peyton Manning; May 3, 1920; Baltimore City, Maryland, US
- Died: April 3, 1945 (aged 24); Hörsching, Austria
- Burial place: Lorraine American Cemetery, France; Plot K, Row 36, Grave 37
- Relatives: Dicey Thomas (Fiancé)
- Military career
- Allegiance: United States
- Branch: United States Army Air Force
- Service years: 1943–1945
- Rank: 2nd Lieutenant
- Unit: 301st Fighter Squadron
- Awards: Air Medal for heroism with 5 Oak Leaf Clusters, European–African–Middle Eastern Campaign Medal (EAME); Purple Heart Medal.; Congressional Gold Medal (2007) (posthumously)

Walter Peyton Manning (May 3, 1920 – April 3, 1945) was an American fighter pilot of the primarily African American Tuskegee Airmen. He flew 50 missions, and was awarded the Air Medal for heroism six times. After being shot down in 1945, he was captured in Austria and subsequently lynched by a mob. He was posthumously awarded the Congressional Gold Medal in 2007 along with all other Tuskegee Airmen. Manning is the only known black man to have been lynched in Austria during World War II.

== Military service ==
=== World War II ===
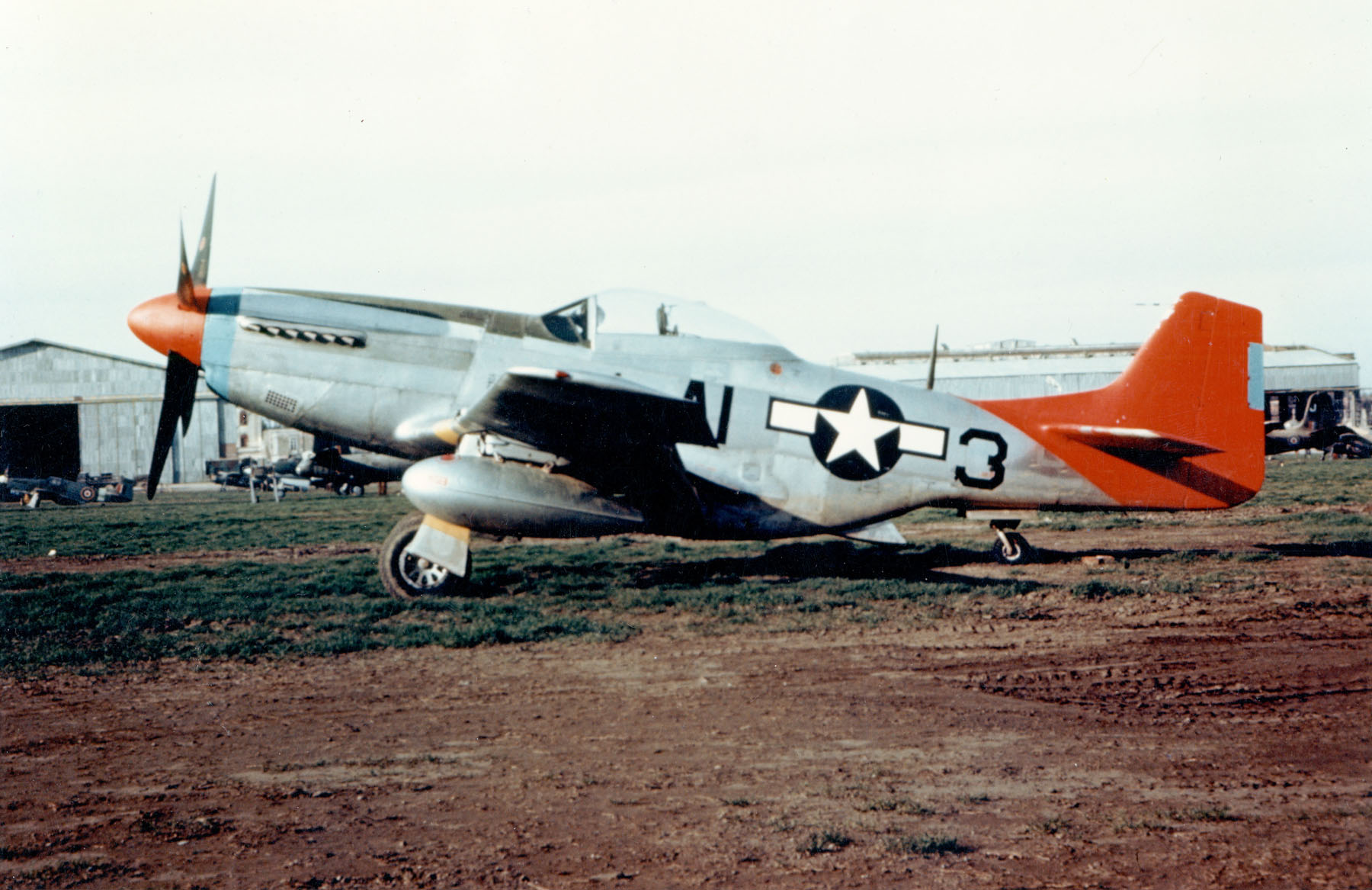
The Tuskegee Airmen's aircraft had distinctive markings that led to the name, "Red Tails". (Note: The red markings that distinguished the Tuskegee Airmen included red bands on the noses of P-51s as well as a red rudder; their P-51B and D Mustangs flew with similar color schemes, with red propeller spinners, yellow wing bands and all-red tail surfaces.)

In 1942, Manning was rejected for military service because of a hammer toe. Manning used his savings to pay for surgery to repair his toe so that he could enlist. In 1943 he enlisted in the Army Air Force. In 1944, after graduating from the Tuskegee Institute, he was assigned to the 301st Fighter Squadron, 332nd fighter Group with the rank of 2nd lieutenant. He served as a pilot from Ramitelli Air Base, Italy.

=== Dogfight ===
Manning was involved in a dogfight with German planes on Easter morning, April 1, 1945, over the Danube river in Austria. The Tuskegee Airmen were escorting B-24 bombers on a bombing mission to the town of St. Polten, Austria. On the return trip to their base at Ramitelli Air Field in Italy, the group spotted enemy planes near Wels, Austria. There were seven Tuskegee Airmen flying the mission that day who engaged the German planes. The American pilots shot down 12 German planes in the dogfight. However, three of the Tuskegee Airmen's planes were shot down in return: one pilot was able to crash-land in friendly territory while Flight Officer William Armstrong was killed outright when he was shot down, and the third pilot was Manning; his plane was damaged so badly that he had to bail out. He parachuted to a waiting mob but was pulled away by a local policeman.

=== Lynching ===
Manning was captured and jailed in Austria at the Hörsching Luftwaffe base near Linz. On April 3, 1945, a mob of civilians, agitated by SS troops and abetted by Luftwaffe officers, broke into the jailhouse and tied Manning's hands behind his back. They dragged Manning outside and beat him badly. They hung a wooden tablet around his neck that read "We help ourselves! The Werwolf", and hanged him from a lamppost.

American soldiers discovered his body in a shallow grave near the air base. A civilian had marked the spot with a wooden cross. Although they found clear signs of murder, US officials closed his case early. Suspects were identified, including two German officers believed to be part of the Werwolf guerrilla group. However, nobody was prosecuted.

=== Research and commemoration ===
In 2013, the Austrian historians Nicole-Melanie Goll and Georg Hoffmann carried out a research project together with Jerry Whiting to examine the fates of downed Allied airmen, including Manning. Together they created a database of the 9,000 Allied pilots killed or shot down over Austria. The historians discovered that 150 Allied pilots, 101 of them American, were murdered on the ground, most by civilians. While white airmen were either shot or beaten to death, Manning was hanged. As a result of their findings, on the 73rd anniversary of his death the Austrian Army raised a commemoration plaque at the place where Manning was murdered.

=== Awards ===
- Air Medal for heroism with 5 Oak Leaf Clusters,
- European–African–Middle Eastern Campaign Medal (EAME)
- Purple Heart Medal.
- Congressional Gold Medal (2007) (posthumously)

== Personal life ==
Manning was born in Baltimore, Maryland but grew up in Philadelphia, Pennsylvania. He attended Howard University. Before leaving for war, Manning was engaged to Dicey Thomas.

== See also ==
- Rüsselsheim massacre - the lynching of 6 American airmen in the German town of Rüsselheim
- Freeman Field Mutiny
- List of Tuskegee Airmen
- Military history of African Americans
