= 44th Fighter Group =

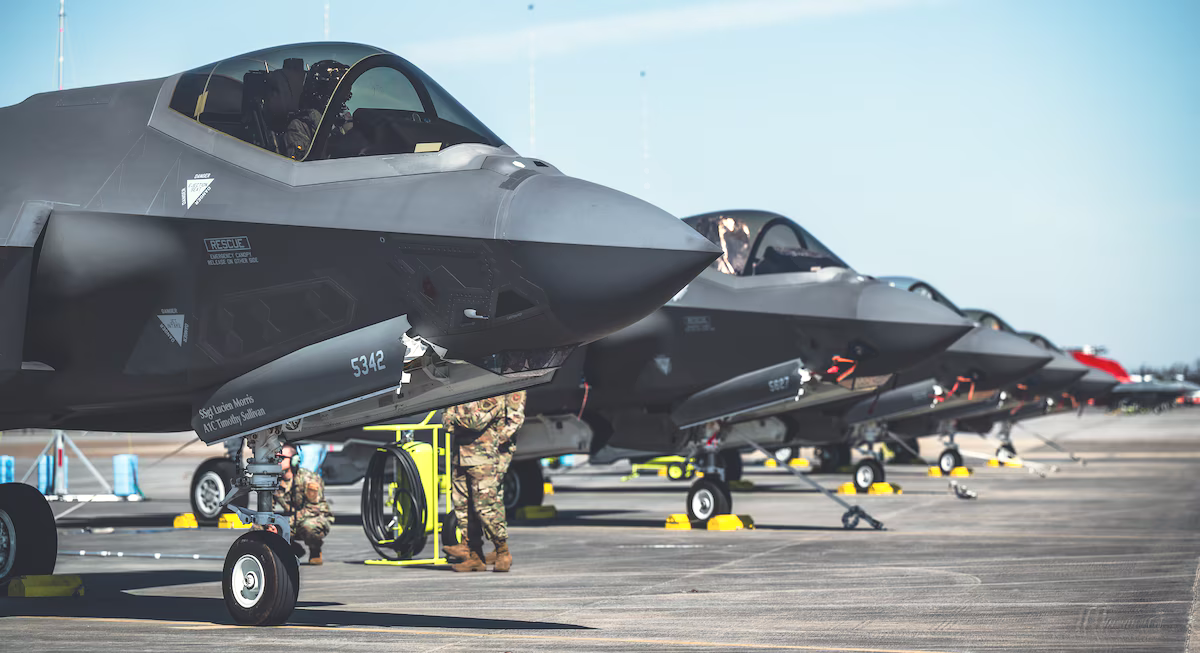
- Airmen prepare to launch multiple F-35A Lightning II aircraft from the Tyndall Air Force Base flight line, Florida, April 6, 2024.
- Active: 15 January 1941–Present
- Country: United States
- Branch: United States Air Force
- Type: Group
- Role: Fighter
- Part of: Air Force Reserve Command
- Garrison/HQ: Tyndall Air Force Base, Florida

Insignia
- 44th Fighter Group emblem

Aircraft flown
- Fighter: F-35 Lightning II

The 44th Fighter Group (44 FG) is an Air Reserve Component (ARC) unit of the United States Air Force. It is assigned to the Tenth Air Force, Air Force Reserve Command (AFRC), stationed at Tyndall Air Force Base, Florida. The 44 FG is an associate unit of the active duty 325th Fighter Wing (325 FW) of the Air Combat Command (ACC). If mobilized to active duty, the 44 FG is operationally gained by ACC. Otherwise, the 44 FG operates as a geographically separated unit (GSU) of AFRC's 301st Fighter Wing (301 FW) at NAS JRB Fort Worth, Texas.

During World War II, its predecessor unit, the 44th Bombardment Group (44 BG), was the first VIII Bomber Command B-24 Liberator heavy bombardment group stationed in England. It was initially stationed at RAF Cheddington on 11 September 1942 and moved to RAF Shipdham in October. The 44 BG operated from England for a longer period than any other B-24 group, sustained the highest Aircraft Missing in Action losses of all Eighth Air Force B-24 groups, claimed more enemy fighters than any other Eighth Air Force B-24 group, and was the first group in the VIII Bomber Command to be awarded a Distinguished Unit Citation for actions on 14 May 1943 for an extremely hazardous mission against naval installations at Kiel, Germany

Colonel Leon W. Johnson, USAAF, while commander of the 44th Bombardment Group, was awarded the Medal of Honor for his actions during the Ploesti Raid on 1 August 1943.

In the postwar era, the 44th Bombardment Group was one of the original ten USAAF bombardment groups assigned to Strategic Air Command on 21 March 1946.

== Overview ==
Administratively, the 44 FG is a component of AFRC's 301st Fighter Wing (301 FW), based at Naval Air Station Fort Worth Joint Reserve Base (formerly Carswell Air Force Base), Texas. Within AFRC channels, the 301 FW is responsible for the 44 FG and its 301st Fighter Squadron (301 FS), flying the F-35 Lightning II as an associate unit to the active duty 325th Operations Group (325 OG) of the 325th Fighter Wing (325 FW) at Tyndall Air Force Base, Florida.

In April 2010, the 44th Fighter Group, Detachment 2 was activated at Holloman Air Force Base, New Mexico. On 1 October 2012, it was transferred to the 325 FW, forming a classic association with the 325 FW while the 325 FW was under the claimancy of the Air Education and Training Command (AETC). Detachment 2 helped lead the transition of the F-22A Raptor combat coded mission from Holloman AFB to Tyndall AFB.

The 44 FG supports operations, flying training and maintenance. The group also supported Northrop T-38 Talon operations at Holloman AFB in which they played the role of adversary aircraft in F-22 training exercises.

In 2012, it was also announced that all F-22A aircraft, pilots and support personnel assigned to Holloman AFB would transfer to Tyndall AFB in the spring of 2013 to comply with USAF's F-22 fleet consolidation plan and the reassignment of the 325 FW from AETC to Air Combat Command (ACC). Due to U.S. congressional action, this transfer was subsequently delayed until January 2014.

Concurrent with relocation of Holloman's active duty F-22A operations to Tyndall AFB, the group shifted its headquarters and main body to Tyndall AFB, replacing Detachment 2 as a reserve associate unit to the 325 FW, operating and maintaining the F-22A at that location while establishing/retaining its Detachment 1 at Holloman in support of MQ-1 Predator and MQ-9 Reaper training and operations as a reserve associate element in support of ACC's active duty 49th Wing (49 WG).

In 2018, Hurricane Michael initiated their temporary relocation to Eglin Air Force Base, Florida. The 44th FG operated the F-22 Raptor air frame until Tyndall's transition to the F-35A was finalized. Soon thereafter, the 44th FG returned to Tyndall in April 2023.

== Units ==
- 301st Fighter Squadron 9 April 2010 – present
- 44th Maintenance Squadron
- 44th Aerospace Medical Flight

== History ==
For additional history and lineage, see 44th Missile Wing

=== World War II ===
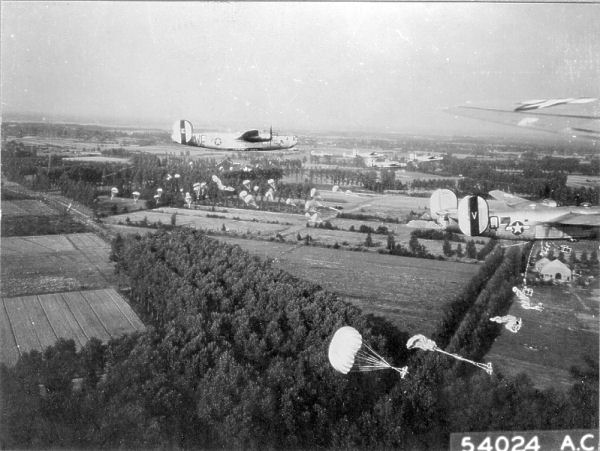
Consolidated B-24 Liberators of the 44th Bomb Group on a parachute drop.

The 44th Bomb Group (44 BG) was activated 15 January 1941 at MacDill Field, Florida. The unit was assigned B-24 Liberator aircraft in its B-24C variant. Moving to Barksdale Field, Louisiana on 16 February 1942, it acted as training unit for 98th, 93rd, and 90th Bomb Groups. During same period, the 44 BG took part in anti-submarine patrols over the Gulf of Mexico and was credited with the destruction of one German Kriegsmarine U-boat. On 26 July 1942, the 44 BG moved to Will Rogers Field, Oklahoma and prepared for overseas movement. The ground echelon departed the United States via the RMS Queen Mary on 4 September 1942. The air echelon was based at Grenier Field, New Hampshire and remained there until the first aircraft left for the United Kingdom late in September 1942. The 404th Bomb Squadron originally part of the Group was reassigned while in the United States.

In England, the group was assigned to the VIII Bomber Command, 14th Combat Bombardment Wing, and the group tail code was a "Circle-A". Initially stationed at RAF Cheddington, the group was moved to RAF Shipdham in October 1942.

The 44th Bomb Group's operations consisted primarily of assaults against strategic targets in France, Belgium, the Netherlands, Germany, Italy, Romania, Austria, Poland, and Sicily. Among the targets attacked were submarine installations, industrial establishments, airfields, harbors, shipyards, and other objectives, November 1942 – June 1943.

The unit received a Distinguished Unit Citation for an extremely hazardous mission against naval installations at Kiel on 14 May 1943. Its B-24s flew in the wake of the main formation and carried incendiaries to be dropped after three B-17 groups had released high explosive bombs, thus the group's aircraft were particularly vulnerable, lacking the protection of the firepower of the main force. This vulnerability increased when the group opened its own formation for the attack; but the 44 BG blanketed the target with incendiaries in spite of the concentrated flak and continuous interceptor attacks it encountered.

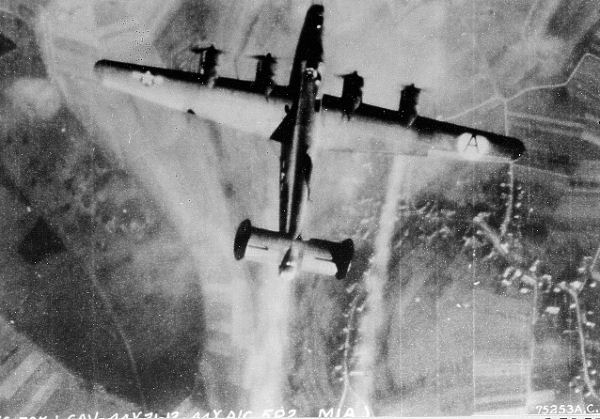
B-24 of the 44th Bomb Group hit by enemy fire on a mission over enemy territory.

Late in June 1943, a large detachment moved to North Africa to help facilitate the Allied invasion of Sicily by bombing airfields and marshalling yards in Italy. The detachment also participated in the famous low-level raid on the Ploesti oil fields on 1 August 1943. The group was awarded a Distinguished Unit Citation for its part in this raid and its commander, Colonel Leon W. Johnson, was awarded the Medal of Honor for his daring and initiative in leading his men into smoke, flame, and alerted fighter and antiaircraft opposition over the target, which already had been bombed in error by another group.

Before returning to England at the end of August, the detachment bombed an aircraft factory in Austria and supported ground forces in Sicily. In September 1943 the group struck airfields in the Netherlands and France and convoys in the North Sea. Also in September, a detachment was sent to North Africa to support the Salerno operations.

This proved to be the 44th's last detachment and in October when several new B-24 groups were arriving in Norfolk in the United Kingdom, the 44th was fully committed to the combined bomber offensive from the UK. From November 1943 to April 1945, the group carried out operations against targets in western Europe, concentrating on airfields, oil installations, and marshalling yards.

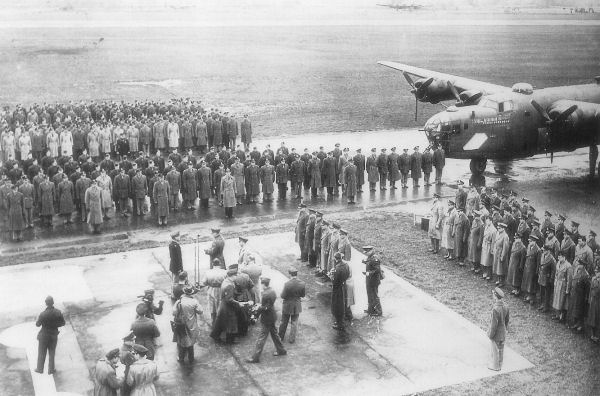
Medal of Honor Ceremony for Col Leon Johnson at Shipdham Airfield, 1943.

The group took part in the intensive campaign of heavy bombers against the German aircraft industry during Big Week, 20–25 February 1944. The group flew support and interdictory missions. Struck airfields, railroads, and V-weapon sites in preparation for the Normandy D-Day invasion; supported the invasion in June 1944 by attacking strong points in the beachhead area and transportation targets behind the front lines. The group aided the Caen offensive and the Saint-Lô breakthrough in July. Dropped food, ammunition, and other supplies to troops engaged in the airborne assault in the Netherlands in September. The group also helped to check the enemy offensive during the Battle of the Bulge, December 1944 – January 1945, by striking bridges, tunnels, choke points, rail and road junctions, and communications in the battle area. The group attacked airfields and transportation in support of the advance into Germany, and flew a resupply mission during the airborne assault across the Rhine in March 1945.

The 44th Bomb Group flew its last combat mission on 25 April 1945. During the course of hostilities, the 44 BG flew a total of 343 missions and its gunners were credited with 330 enemy fighters shot down and its own losses, the highest of any B-24 group in the Eighth Air Force, were 153.

The 44 BG redeployed to the United States in June 1945. The first increment of the air echelon departed the United Kingdom on 22 May 1945 and the ground echelon again sailed on RMS Queen Mary on 15 June 1945, arriving in New York on 20 June 1945. Personnel had 30 days rest and recuperation (R&R) leave, with some assembling at Sioux Falls Army Airfield, South Dakota.

=== SAC Bombardment Group ===
In July 1945, the 44 BG was selected for reforming as a B-29 Superfortress unit and, in late July 1945, established at Great Bend Army Airfield, Kansas for training. Aircraft and personnel were transferred to another unit and the 44 BG was inactivated within the U.S. Army Air Forces on 12 July 1946.

As part of the U.S. Air Force, the 44 BG was one of the Strategic Air Command (SAC) bomb groups activated and placed in training status 6 months after that start of the Korean War. It depended on the 22nd Bombardment Group for initial cadre and help in becoming organized. It was designated as "Not Manned" effective 10 February 1951 and was inactivated on 16 June 1952 when its parent unit, the 44th Bombardment Wing (44 BMW), converted to the Air Force tri-deputate organization and all assigned units and personnel were assigned directly to the 44 BMW.

=== SAC ICBM Operations Group ===
Redesignated as the 44th Operations Group (44 OG) within the Strategic Air Command and activated on 1 September 1991 under the "Objective Wing" concept adopted by the Air Force. The ICBM squadrons of the renamed 44th Missile Wing were reassigned to the group.

On 28 September 1991, in response to President Bush's directive to stand down the Minuteman II, personnel of the 44 OG worked around the clock to dissipate launch codes and pin safety control switches at 15 launch control facilities. Removal of the first Minuteman II missile assigned to the 44 OG occurred at Site G-02, near Red Owl, South Dakota, on 3 December 1991. On 6 April 1992, the first launch control center shut down.

On 1 June 1992, the 44 OG was relieved of its Emergency War Order mission and its primary focus was deactivation of the Minuteman II weapon system. This day also marked the end of SAC as a USAF major command and the beginning of the Air Combat Command (ACC).

The 67th Missile Squadron (67 MS) was inactivated on 15 August 1992 and the 66 MS was inactivated on 1 September 1993. On 1 July 1993 its parent unit, the 44 MW changed hands from ACC to the Air Force Space Command (AFSPC) along with all other ICBM wings. Deactivation of the entire missile complex ended in April 1994. With its mission complete, the 44th Operations Group formally inactivated on 4 July 1994.

=== AFRC Fighter Group ===
On 9 April 2010, the 44th Fighter Group (44 FG) of the Air Force Reserve Command was activated at Holloman AFB, New Mexico as an associate unit to the 49th Fighter Wing (49 FW) of the Air Combat Command as part of that unit's F-22 Raptor operations. The 44th Aircraft Maintenance Squadron and 301st Fighter Squadron were also activated during the ceremony as part of the fighter group.

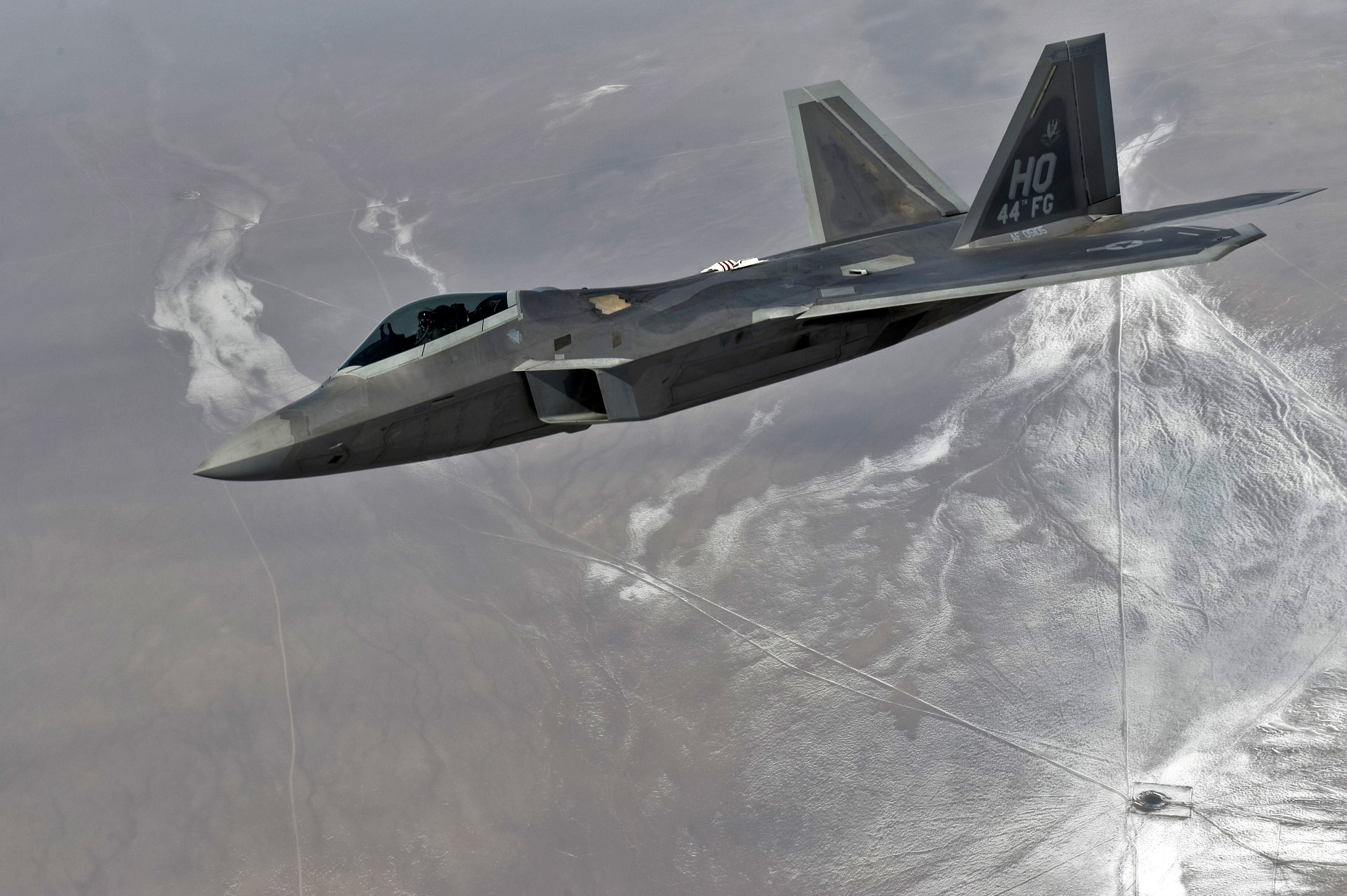
F-22A Raptor assigned to the 44th Fighter Group flies over the Nevada Test and Training Range (NTTR) for a training mission during Red Flag 11-3, 2 March 2011.

In 2012, it was announced that all F-22 aircraft, pilots and support personnel assigned to Holloman AFB would be transferred to Tyndall AFB, Florida in the spring of 2013 to comply with USAF's F-22 fleet consolidation plan. However, in August 2013, the U.S. Congress enacted a freeze on U.S. Air Force structure changes, including aircraft transfers. By the end of 2013, all issues were resolved, and the Congress permitted the divestiture of F-22 operations from the 49 FW pending transition to F-16 Fighting Falcon operations. The first five F-22 Raptors left Holloman AFB for Tyndall AFB on 6 January 2014 with the final four-ship tactical sortie being flown on 20 February. The final F-22 departed for Tyndall AFB on 9 April 2014 and the 44 FG completed its relocation from Holloman to Tyndall as an AFRC associate unit to the 325th Fighter Wing (325 FW) on 12 July 2014.

The 44 FG is one of only two Air Force Reserve organizations selected to fly and maintain the F-22 Raptor. The 44 FG also established 44 FG Detachment 1 (44 FG Det 1) at Holloman AFB, which assists in the training of Pilots and Sensor Operators for the MQ-1 Predator and MQ-9 Reaper remotely piloted aircraft as an AFRC associate unit to the active duty Air Force's 49th Wing (49 WG).

Following the destruction of Tyndall AFB due to Hurricane Michael in October 2018, 325 FW Formal Training Unit (FTU) flight operations with the F-22 and T-38 relocated to Eglin AFB, Florida with instructor pilots and maintenance personnel of the 44 FG following suit.

With the F-22A FTU mission slated to transfer to the 1st Fighter Wing (1 FW) at Joint Base Langley-Eustis, Virginia, and the transition of both the 325 FW and the 44 FG's "parent" AFRC wing, the 301 FW, to the F-35A Lightning II, the 44 FG will also transition to the F-35A and eventually relocate back to Tyndall AFB following that installation's reconstruction. In lieu of an FTU mission, the 44th Fighter Group became a combat coded F-35A Associate unit to the 325 FW.

=== Lineage ===
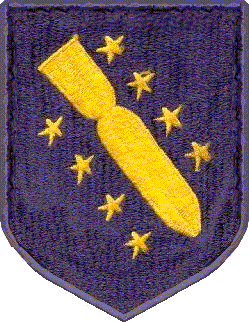
Emblem of the 44th Bombardment Group

- Constituted as 44th Bombardment Group (Heavy) on 20 November 1940

Activated on 15 January 1941
Re-designated: 44th Bombardment Group (Very Heavy) in August 1945
Inactivated on 12 July 1946

- Activated on 1 July 1947 (Not manned or equipped); Inactivated on 6 September 1948
- Re-designated: 44th Bombardment Group (Medium) and activated on 2 January 1951

Inactivated on 16 June 1952

- Re-designated: 44th Operations Group and activated on 1 September 1991

Inactivated on 4 July 1994

- Re-designated: 44th Fighter Group and activated on 9 April 2010

=== Assignments ===
- III Bomber Command, 15 January 1941 – 28 August 1942
- 2d Bombardment Wing, 11 September 1942

Attached to: 201st Provisional Combat Bombardment Wing, 25 March 1943
Attached to: 202d Provisional Combat Bombardment Wing, 2 September 1943

- 14th Combat Bombardment Wing, 13 September 1943 – 15 June 1945
- Second Air Force, 27 June 1945 – 12 July 1946
- Strategic Air Command, July 1947-6 September 1948
- 44th Bombardment Wing, 2 January 1951 – 16 June 1952
- 44th Missile Wing, 1 September 1991 – 5 July 1994
- Tenth Air Force, 9 April 2010 – present

=== Components ===
- 66th Bombardment (later Missile) Squadron: 15 January 1941 – 12 July 1946; 1 Jul 1947 – 6 Sep 1948; 2 January 1951; 1 September 1991 – 1 September 1993
- 67th Bombardment (later Missile) Squadron: 15 January 1941 – 12 July 1946; 1 Jul 1947 – 6 Sep 1948; 2 January 1951; 1 September 1991 – 15 August 1992
- 68th Bombardment (later Missile) Squadron: 15 January 1941 – 12 July 1946; 1 Jul 1947 – 6 Sep 1948; 2 January 1951; 1 September 1991 – 5 July 1994
- 14th Reconnaissance Squadron (Heavy) (later 404th Bombardment Squadron): 15 January 1941 – 12 July 1942
- 506th Bombardment Squadron: 1 October 1942 – 7 March 1946
- 301st Fighter Squadron: 9 April 2010 – present

=== Stations ===
- MacDill Field, Florida, 15 January 1941
- Barksdale Field, Louisiana, February 1942
- Will Rogers Field, Oklahoma, July – c. 28 August 1942
- RAF Cheddington (AAF-113), England, 11 September 1942 – 9 October 1942
- RAF Shipdham (AAF-115), England, 10 October 1942-c. 15 June 1945
- Sioux Falls Army Air Field, South Dakota, c. 27 June 1945 – 24 July 1945
- Great Bend Army Air Field, Kansas, 25 July 1945 – 13 December 1945
- Smoky Hill Army Air Field, Kansas, 14 December 1945 – 12 July 1946
- Andrews Field (later Andrews AFB), Maryland, July 1947 – 6 September 1948
- March AFB, California, 2 January 1951 – c. August 1951
- Lake Charles AFB, Louisiana, c. August 1951 – 16 June 1952
- Ellsworth AFB, South Dakota, 1 September 1991 – 4 July 1994
- Holloman AFB, New Mexico, 9 April 2010 – 11 July 2014
- Tyndall AFB, Florida, 12 July 2014 – Present

=== Aircraft and missiles ===
- B-24 Liberator, 1941–1945
- TB-29 Superfortress, 1951; B-29 Superfortress, 1945–1946; 1947–1948; 1951–1952
- LGM-30F Minuteman II, 1991–1994
- F-22 Raptor, 2010 – 2023
- F-35 Lightning II, 2024 - Present
