= Arlington Ladies =

American volunteer organization

The Arlington Ladies are a group of women who attend the funeral of every member of the United States armed forces who is buried at Arlington National Cemetery. The group also includes one man who is known as the Arlington Gentleman.

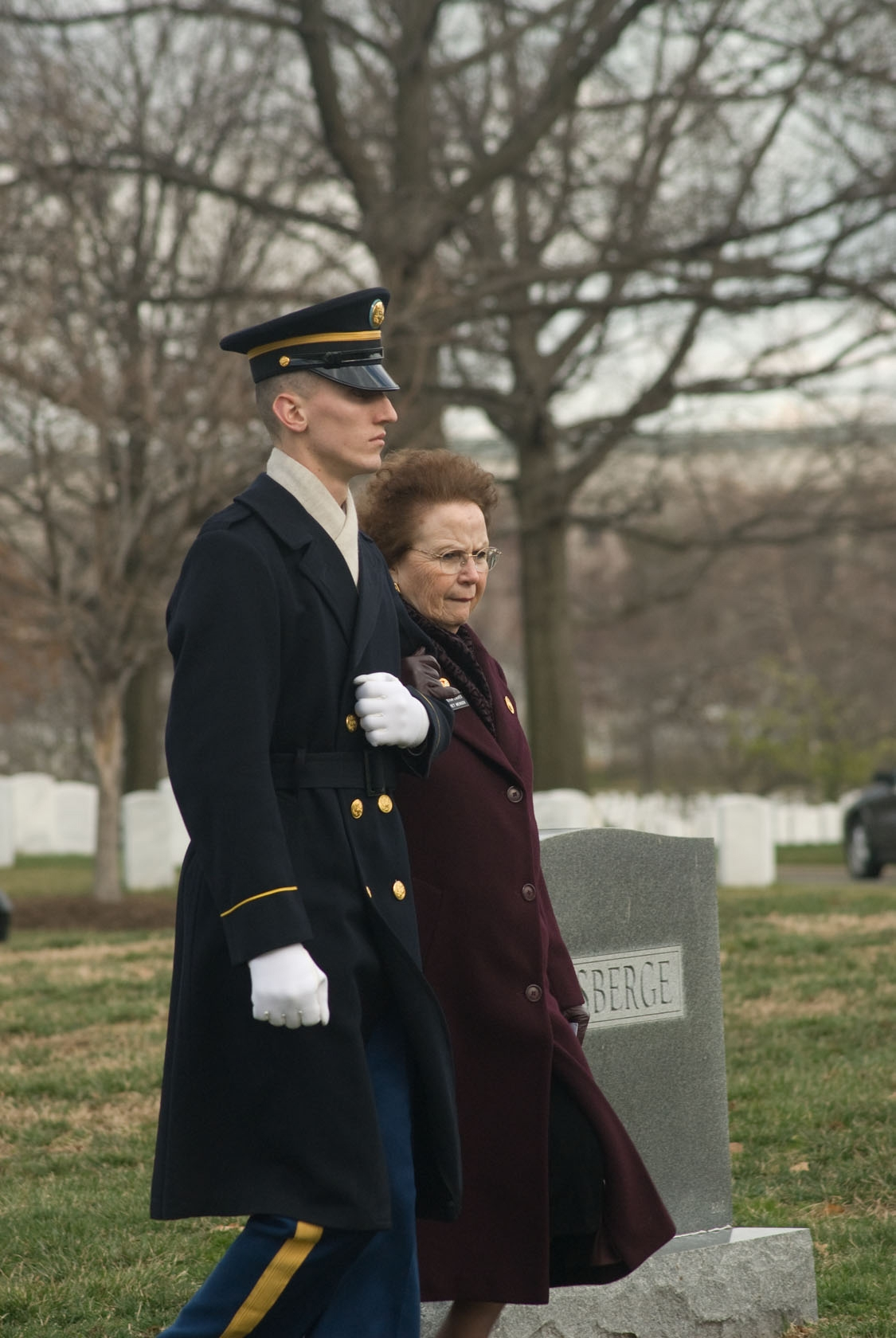
An Arlington Lady being escorted to a grave on May 6, 2008

The history of the group traces its existence to 1948, when Chief of Staff of the United States Air Force Hoyt Vandenberg, and his wife Gladys, witnessed young servicemembers being buried without any family members present on one of their walks through the cemetery. Just a chaplain and a military honor guard, the standard attendees, were usually present. The lack of anyone honoring the young airman being buried prompted Gladys to form a group of members of the Officers' Wives Club to attend all Air Force funerals. In 1972, the wife of Army Chief of Staff General Creighton Abrams, Julia, founded the Army's version of the group. In 1985, the Navy also followed suit by creating a group of their own. The Coast Guard Arlington Ladies group formed in 2006. The Marine Corps Arlington Ladies were established in 2016.

Originally, the women worked alone at the funerals. Escorts were eventually added as it was decided that they should appear to be a more official part of the ceremony. The escorts are also members of the Army's 3rd Infantry Regiment. The Army soldiers typically spend four months as escorts while the Navy men are permanently assigned and will spend their entire tours on assignment.

The group initially included military wives, but it now includes military daughters and even a gentleman. The Army Arlington ladies must be wives or widows of Army men and be referred by a current wife. The Navy and Air Force follow similar requirements for their ladies.
