= Hoyt Vandenberg =

U.S. Air Force general (1899–1954)

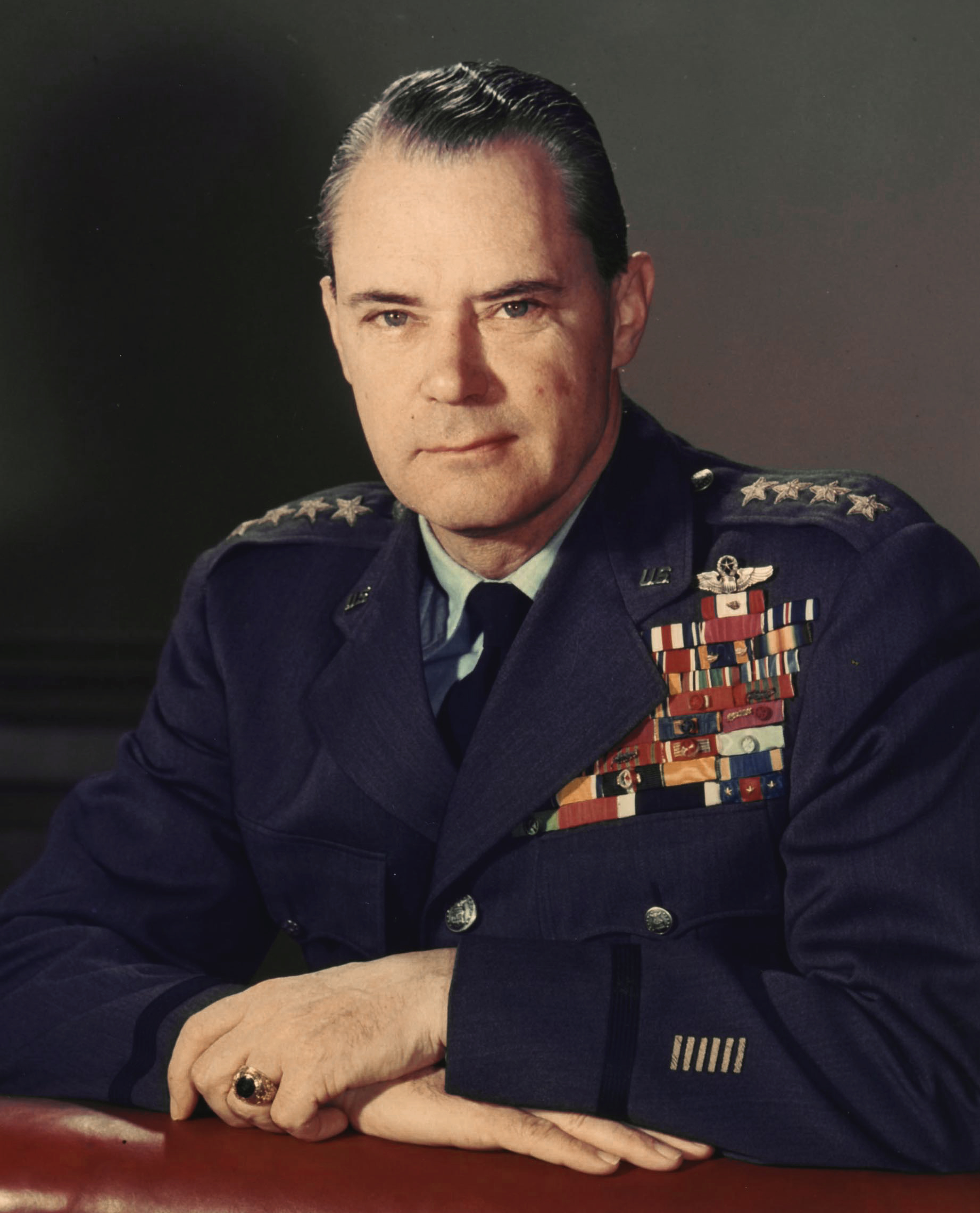

Chief of Staff of the Air Force
- In office April 30, 1948 – June 29, 1953
- President: Harry Truman; Dwight Eisenhower
- Deputy: Muir S. Fairchild; Nathan F. Twining
- Preceded by: Carl Spaatz
- Succeeded by: Nathan Twining

Vice Chief of Staff of the Air Force
- In office October 1, 1947 – April 30, 1948
- President: Harry Truman
- Preceded by: Position established
- Succeeded by: Muir S. Fairchild

2nd Director of Central Intelligence
- In office June 10, 1946 – May 1, 1947
- President: Harry Truman
- Deputy: Kingman Douglass; Edwin K. Wright
- Preceded by: Sidney Souers
- Succeeded by: Roscoe H. Hillenkoetter

Personal details
- Born: Hoyt Sanford Vandenberg; January 24, 1899 Milwaukee, Wisconsin, U.S.
- Died: April 2, 1954 (aged 55) Washington D.C., U.S.
- Spouse: Gladys Rose (m. 1923)
- Relations: Leon W. Johnson (father-in-law of Hoyt Jr.) Arthur Vandenberg (uncle)
- Children: Gloria (Vandenberg) Miller, Hoyt S. Vandenberg, Jr.
- Education: United States Military Academy (BA)

Military service
- Allegiance: United States
- Branch/service: United States Army; United States Air Force
- Years of service: 1923–1953
- Rank: General
- Commands: Chief of Staff of the United States Air Force; Twelfth Air Force; Ninth Air Force
- Battles/wars: World War II; Korean War
- Awards: Army Distinguished Service Medal (3); Silver Star; Legion of Merit; Distinguished Flying Cross; Bronze Star Medal; Air Medal (5)

Hoyt Sanford Vandenberg (January 24, 1899 – April 2, 1954) was a United States Air Force general. He served as the second Chief of Staff of the Air Force, and the second Director of Central Intelligence.

During World War II, Vandenberg was the commanding general of the Ninth Air Force, a tactical air force in England and in France, supporting the Army, from August 1944 until V-E Day. Vandenberg Space Force Base on the central coast of California is named after him. In 1946, he was briefly the U.S. Chief of Military Intelligence. He was the nephew of Arthur H. Vandenberg, a former U.S. Senator from Michigan, and the father of Hoyt S. Vandenberg Jr., a retired major general in the United States Air Force.

== Early life ==
Vandenberg was born in Milwaukee, Wisconsin, the son of Pearl Kane and William Collins Vandenberg, both from Dutch ancestry. He was named in honor of a family's business partner, Eli W. Hoyt, and his maternal grandfather, Sanford Kane. He had a younger brother named Aaron Shedd Vandenberg. He grew up in Lowell, Massachusetts, spending his teenage years there. While there he was one of the first Eagle Scouts in the Boy Scouts of America's Lowell Council. Graduated from Lowell High School. Vandenberg was appointed to in the United States Military Academy in 1919, graduated from the academy on June 12, 1923, and was commissioned a second lieutenant in the United States Army Air Service.

== Military career ==
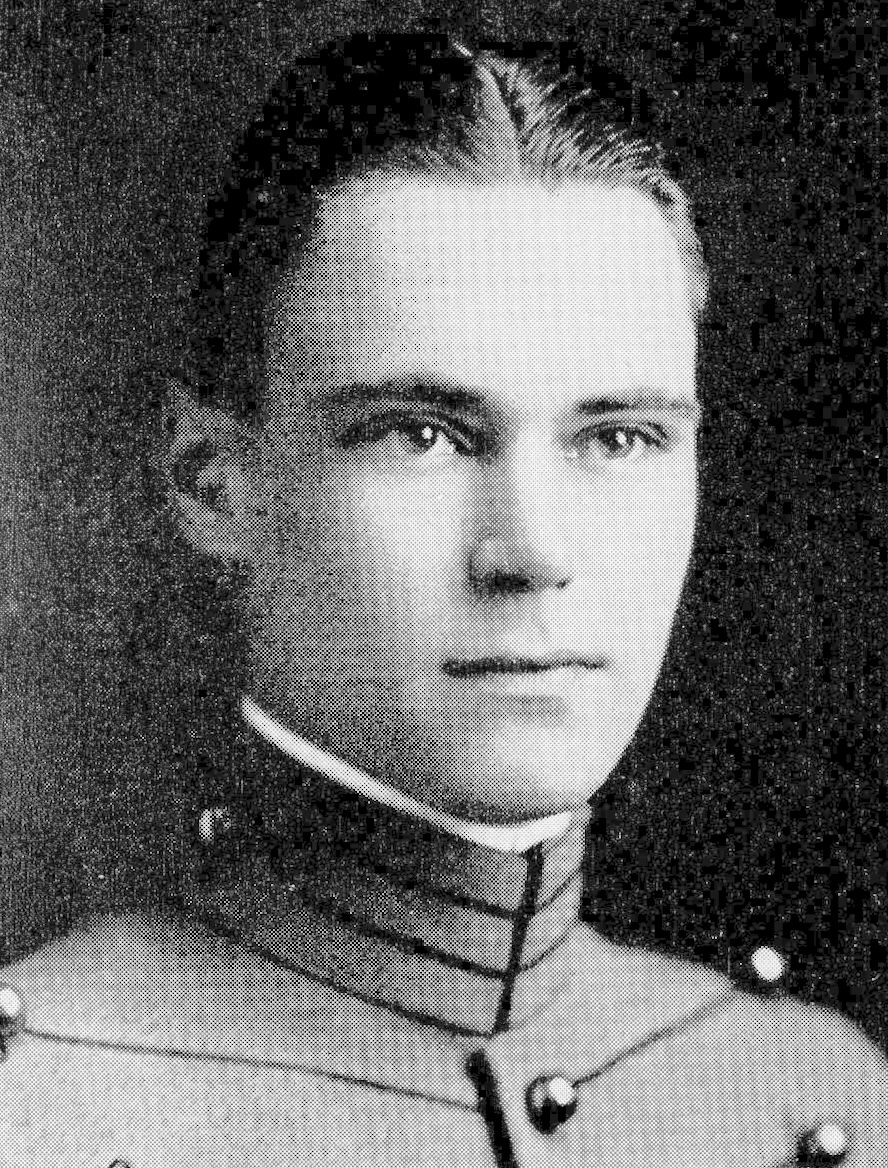
At West Point in 1923

Vandenberg graduated from the Air Service Flying School at Brooks Field, Texas, in February 1924, and from the Air Service Advanced Flying School at Kelly Field, Texas, in September 1924.

Vandenberg's first assignment was with the 90th Attack Squadron, part of the 3rd Attack Group at Kelly Field. (In 1926 Lt. Van was also a stunt pilot for the silent film Wings which was filming in San Antonio. Wings won the first Academy Award for a motion picture.) Vandenberg was appointed commander of the 90th AS on January 1, 1926. In 1927, he became an instructor at the Air Corps Primary Flying School at March Field, Calif. In 1928 he was promoted to first lieutenant. In May 1929 he went to Wheeler Field, Hawaii, to join the 6th Pursuit Squadron, and assumed command of it the following November.

Returning in September 1931, Vandenberg was appointed a flying instructor at Randolph Field, Texas, and became a flight commander and deputy stage commander there in March 1933. He entered the Air Corps Tactical School at Maxwell Field, Alabama, in August 1934, and graduated the following June. Two months later he enrolled in the Command and General Staff School at Fort Leavenworth, Kansas; he completed the course in June 1936 and was promoted to the rank of captain. He then became an instructor in the Pursuit Section of the Air Corps Tactical School, where he taught until September 1936, when he entered the Army War College, where he specialized in air defense planning for the Philippines.

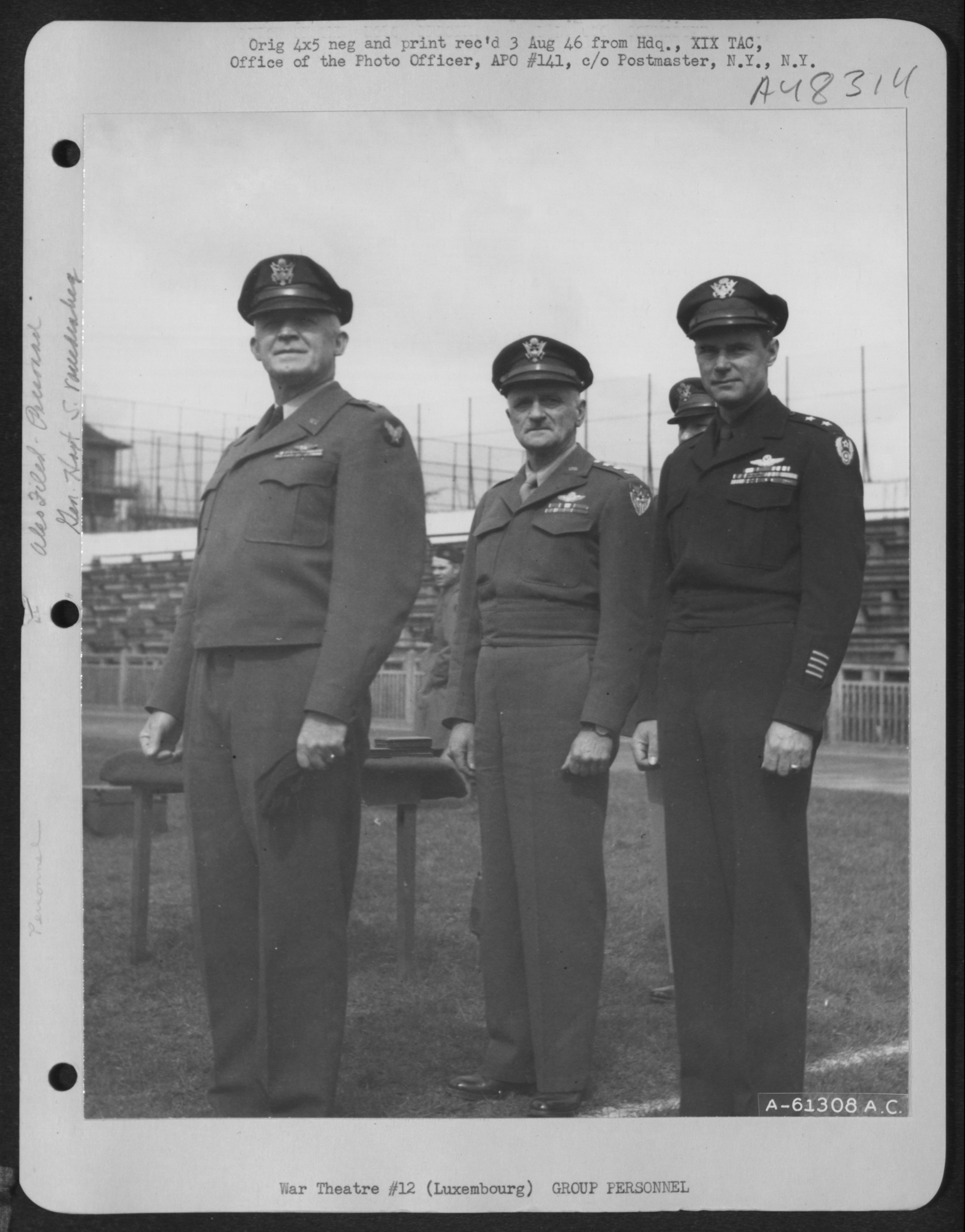
Major General Hoyt Vandenberg (right), with Generals Carl A. Spaatz (middle) Henry H. Arnold, at decoration ceremonies in Luxembourg City on April 7, 1945

After graduating from the War College in June 1939, Vandenberg was assigned to the Plans Division in the Office of the Chief of Air Corps, selected personally by its head, Brigadier General Carl Spaatz, whom he had met at the Command and General Staff College. In September 1939 and the autumn of 1940, Vandenberg developed two air plans for the Philippine Department, the second based on Royal Air Force interceptor operations in the Battle of Britain, but neither was adopted by the War Department when the Roosevelt Administration reaffirmed its long-standing opposition to any plan that called for extensive reinforcement of the defenses in the Philippines. In 1940 Vandenberg was promoted to major and in 1941 to lieutenant colonel.

A few months after the United States entered World War II, Vandenberg was promoted to colonel and became operations and training officer of the Air Staff. For his services in these two positions he received the Distinguished Service Medal.

In June 1942, Vandenberg was assigned to the United Kingdom and assisted in the organization of the Air Forces in North Africa. While in Great Britain he was appointed the chief of staff of the Twelfth Air Force, which he helped organize. In December 1942 Vandenberg earned the promotion to brigadier general. On February 18, 1943, Vandenberg became the chief of staff of the Northwest African Strategic Air Force (NASAF), which was under the command of Major General James Doolittle. NASAF was the strategic arm of the new Northwest African Air Forces (NAAF) under Lieutenant General Carl Spaatz. With NASAF, Vandenberg flew on numerous missions over Tunisia, Pantelleria, Sardinia, Sicily, and Italy. He was awarded both the Silver Star and the Distinguished Flying Cross for his services during this time. For his organizational ability with the Twelfth Air Force and his work as chief of staff of the NASAF, he was awarded the Legion of Merit.

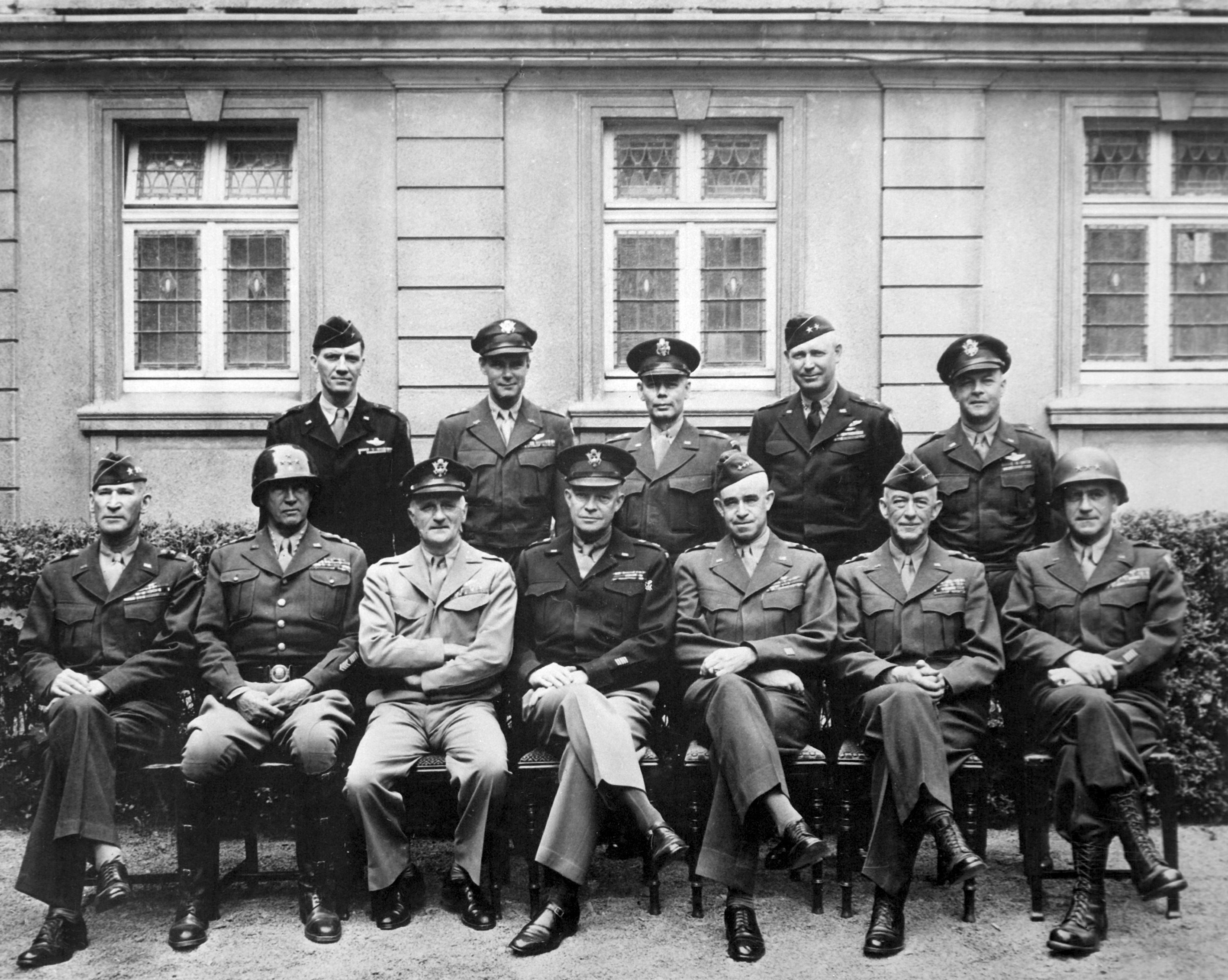
Eisenhower (seated, middle) with other US Army officers, 1945. From left to right, the front row includes Simpson, Patton, Spaatz, Eisenhower, Bradley, Hodges, and Gerow. Vandenberg is second from the left in the second row.

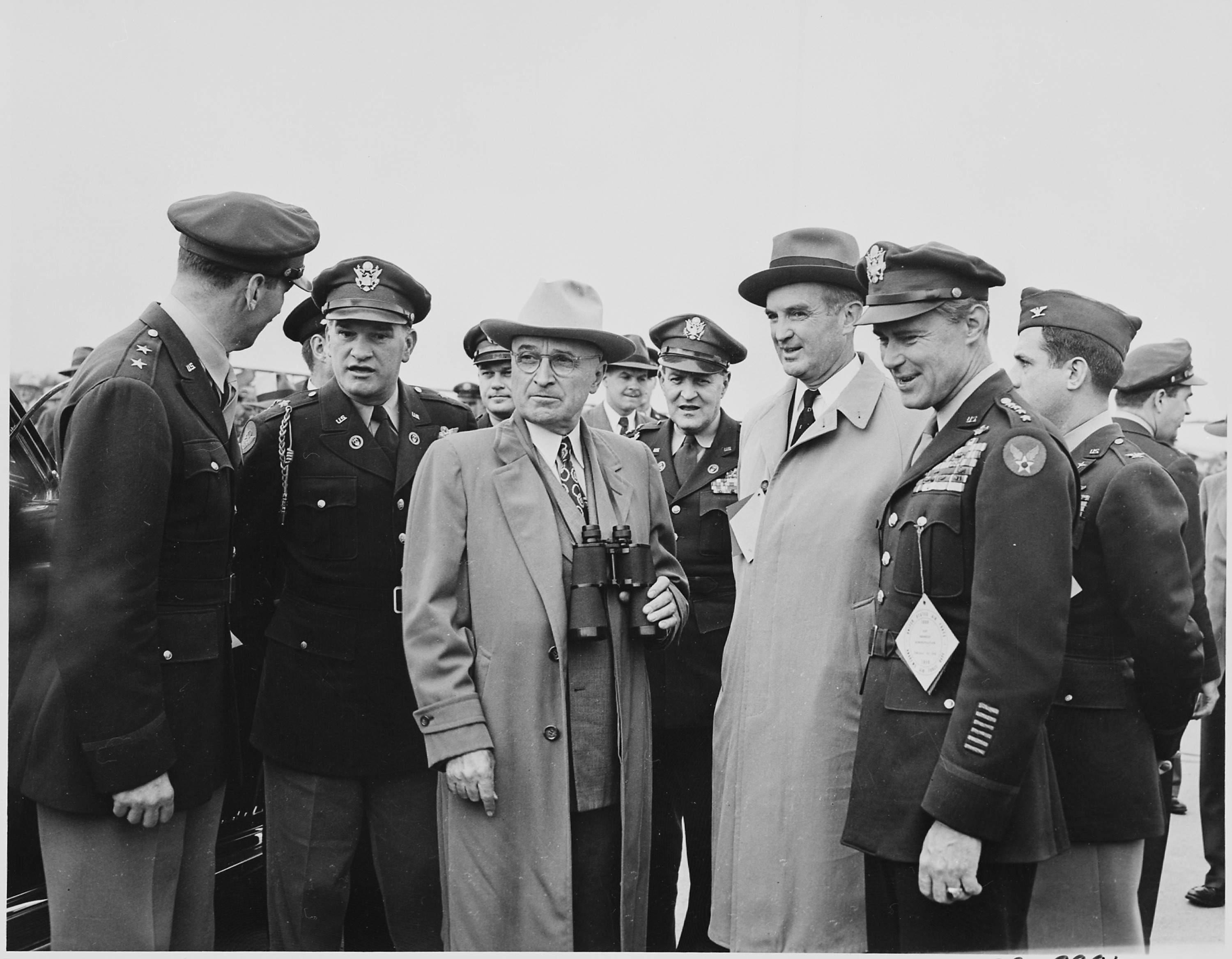
U.S. Air Force Chief of Staff General Hoyt Vandenberg with U.S. President Harry S. Truman and U.S. Secretary of the Air Force Stuart Symington at an air show at Andrews Air Force Base, February 15, 1949.

In August 1943, Vandenberg was assigned to Air Force headquarters as Deputy Chief of Air Staff. In September 1943, he became head of an air mission to the Soviet Union, under Ambassador Averell Harriman, and returned to the United States in January 1944. In March 1944, he earned the promotion to major general and then he was transferred to the European theater; in April 1944, he was designated the Deputy Air Commander in Chief of the Allied Expeditionary Forces and the Commander of its American Air Component. In August 1944, Vandenberg assumed command of the Ninth Air Force. On November 28, 1944, he received an oak leaf cluster to his Distinguished Service Medal for his part in planning the Normandy invasion. He was promoted to lieutenant general in March 1945.

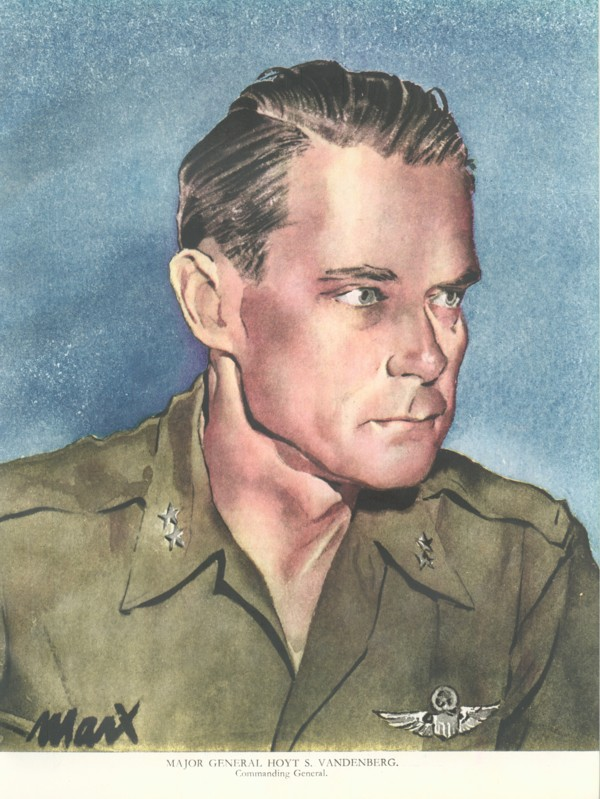
Watercolor portrait of Major General Hoyt S. Vandenberg, 9th Air Force, United States Army Air Force 1945

Vandenberg was appointed the Assistant Chief of Air Staff at the U.S. Army Air Forces (USAAF) headquarters in July 1945. In January 1946, he became Director of Intelligence on the War Department general staff where he served until his appointment in June 1946, as Director of Central Intelligence, a position he held until May 1947.

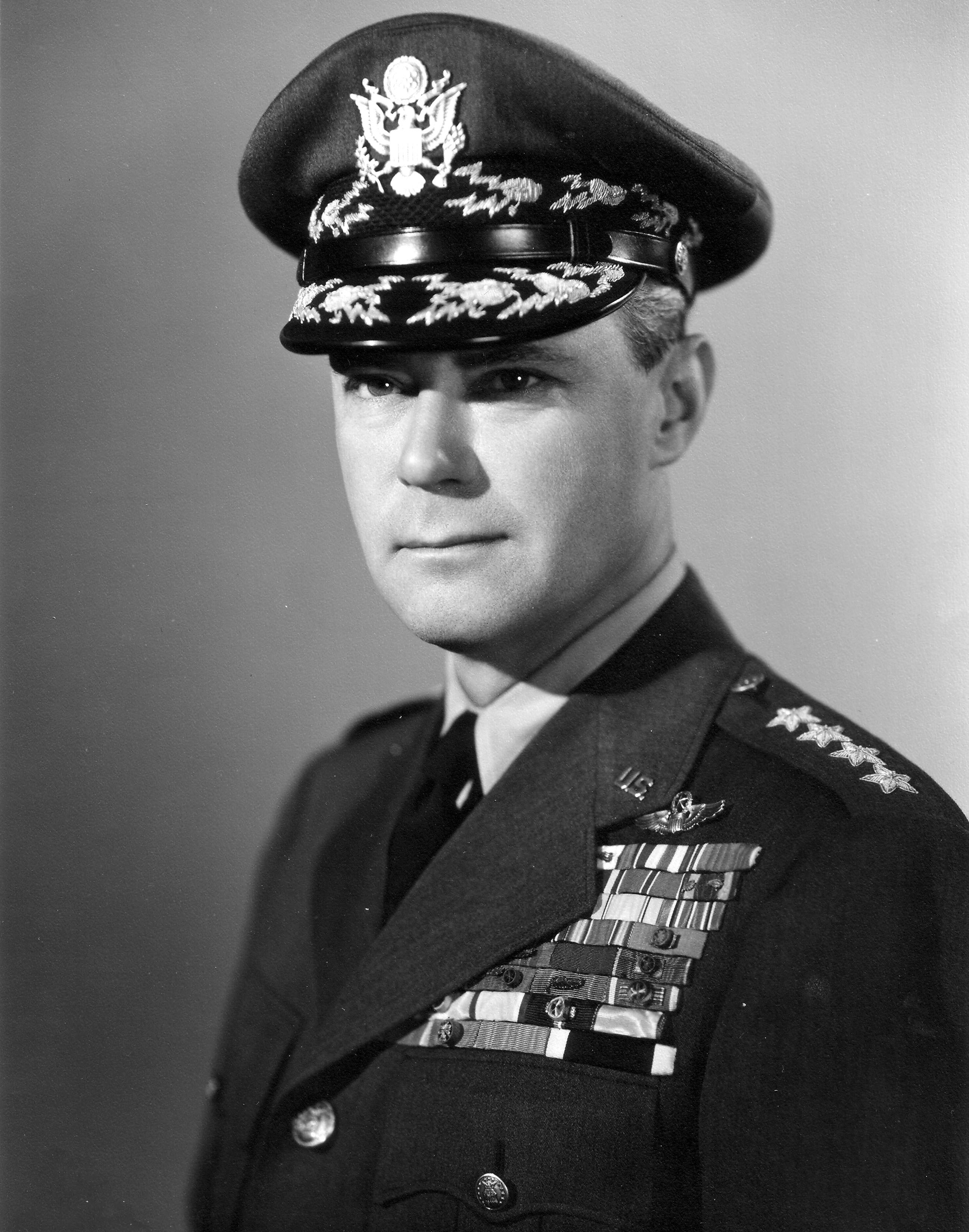
General Hoyt S. Vandenberg

Vandenberg returned to duty with the Air Force in April 1947, and on June 15 became the Deputy Commander in Chief of the Air Staff. Following the division of the United States Department of War into the Departments of the Army and the Air Force, Vandenberg was designated the Vice Chief of Staff of the United States Air Force on October 1, 1947, and promoted to the rank of general.

Even when Vandenberg was at the pinnacle of his military career, his boyish good looks and outgoing personality often made him the target of attacks on his credibility and experience. However, the attention that his appearance brought on was not all bad. He appeared on the covers of Time and Life magazines. The Washington Post once described him as "the most impossibly handsome man on the entire Washington scene," and Marilyn Monroe once named Vandenberg, along with Joe DiMaggio and Albert Einstein, as one of the three people with whom she would want to be stranded on a deserted island.

On April 30, 1948, Vandenberg became the Chief of Staff of the United States Air Force, succeeding General Carl Spaatz. He was renominated by President Harry S. Truman for a second term as Air Force Chief of Staff on March 6, 1952. The nomination was confirmed on April 28, with Vandenberg serving until June 30, 1953.

A controversy arose while Vandenberg was the Air Force Chief of Staff, when he opposed the United States Secretary of Defense Charles Erwin Wilson on a proposed $5 billion budget reduction for the Air Force. Vandenberg maintained that the cut backed by Wilson would reduce military aviation to a "one-shot Air Force," inferior to that of the Soviet Union. He said it was another instance of "start-stop" planning of a kind that had impeded Air Force development in previous years. The cut in appropriations went into effect in July 1953, immediately after his retirement from the Air Force.

== Later life ==
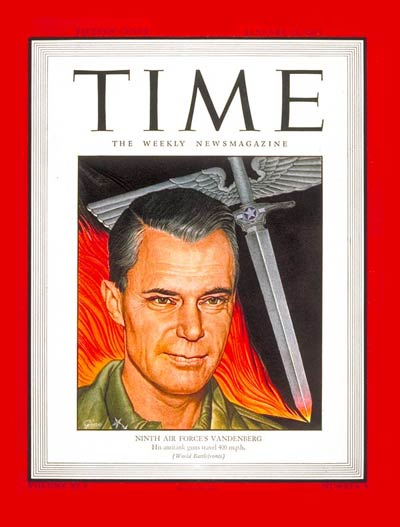
On the January 15, 1945, cover of Time magazine

A scratch golfer, he spent much time on golf courses. He was also a lover of movies, Westerns, and scotch. Vandenberg retired from active duty on June 30, 1953, and he died nine months later, at the Walter Reed Army Medical Center of prostate cancer at the age of 55. He is interred in Section 30 of Arlington National Cemetery.

His wife, Gladys Merritt (Rose) Vandenberg (1898–1978), started the concept of the Arlington Ladies while he was Air Force Chief of Staff. The program provides that a woman of the appropriate military service represents the service chief at all military funerals at Arlington National Cemetery. She was buried, alongside her husband, in Arlington National Cemetery upon her death on January 9, 1978. They are survived by their children, Gloria Vandenberg Miller (1925–2022) and Hoyt S. Vandenberg, Jr., who had married the daughter of another Air Force general, Leon W. Johnson.

== Namesakes ==
On October 4, 1958, the missile and space base at Camp Cooke in Lompoc, California, was renamed Vandenberg Air Force Base (which was redesignated Vandenberg Space Force Base in 2021). In July 1963, the instrument ship USNS General Hoyt S. Vandenberg (T-AGM-10) was renamed at Cape Canaveral, Florida, for duty on the Eastern Space and Missile Range in the Atlantic. One of the two cadets' dormitories at the United States Air Force Academy, Vandenberg Hall, is also named in his honor. In addition, Vandenberg Community Center, a "hangout" for technical school Airmen at Keesler AFB, Mississippi, is named in his honor, as was the Vandenberg Esplanade, along the Merrimack River in Lowell, Massachusetts and part of the Lowell Heritage State Park.

== Dates of rank ==
Insignia	Rank	Component	Date
None	Cadet	United States Military Academy	June 13, 1919
	Second lieutenant	Regular Army (United States Army Air Service)	June 12, 1923
	First lieutenant	Regular Army (United States Army Air Corps)	August 19, 1928
	Captain	Regular Army (United States Army Air Corps)	August 1, 1935
	Temporary Major	Regular Army (United States Army Air Corps)	March 11, 1940
	Major	Regular Army (United States Army Air Corps)	July 1, 1940
	Temporary Lieutenant colonel	Regular Army (United States Army Air Corps)	November 15 (accepted December 5) 1941
	Lieutenant colonel	Army of the United States	December 24, 1941
	Colonel	Army of the United States	January 27, 1942
	Brigadier general	Army of the United States	December 3, 1942
	Major general	Army of the United States	March 13, 1944
	Lieutenant general	Army of the United States	March 17, 1945
	Lieutenant colonel	Regular Army (United States Army Air Forces)	June 12, 1946
	Brigadier general	Regular Army (United States Army Air Forces)	June 22 (rank from April 30) 1946
	Major general	Regular Army (United States Army Air Forces)	August 1, 1947
	General	Army of the United States	October 1, 1947
	General	United States Air Force	April 30, 1948

== Awards and decorations ==
Command Pilot

Distinguished Service Medal with two oak leaf clusters
Silver Star
Legion of Merit
Distinguished Flying Cross
Bronze Star Medal
Air Medal with four oak leaf clusters
World War I Victory Medal
American Defense Service Medal
American Campaign Medal
European-African-Middle East Campaign Medal
World War II Victory Medal
National Defense Service Medal

Foreign awards

Unidentified Order, Officer (Italy)
Grand Officer (with swords) of the Order of Orange Nassau (Netherlands)
Grand Officer of the National Order of the Southern Cross (Brazil)
Medal of War (Brazil)
Grand Cross of the Order of Adolphe of Nassau (Luxembourg)
Croix de Guerre (Luxembourg)
Officer with Palm of the Order of Leopold (Belgium)
Grand Officer of the Legion of Honor (France)
Croix de Guerre with bronze Palm (France)
Knight Commander of the Order of the Bath (Britain)
Commander's Cross (with Star) of the Order of Polonia Restituta (Poland)
Grand Cross of the Order of Aviz (Portugal)
Grand Cordon of the Order of the Nile (Egypt)
Grand Cordon Order of Pao Ting (Republic of China)
Medalla Militar de Primera Clase (Chile)
General Staff Emblem (Argentina)
Knight Grand Cross of the Military Order of Italy

The Manuscript Collection of Hoyt S. Vandenberg at the Library of Congress as of November 2005 is Classified information.

Government offices
Preceded by Sidney Souers	Director of Central Intelligence; 1946–1947	Succeeded by Roscoe H. Hillenkoetter
Military offices
New office	Vice Chief of Staff of the Air Force; 1947–1948	Succeeded by Muir S. Fairchild
Preceded by Carl Spaatz	Chief of Staff of the Air Force; 1948–1953	Succeeded by Nathan Twining
