= Hoyt S. Vandenberg Jr. =

United States Air Force general

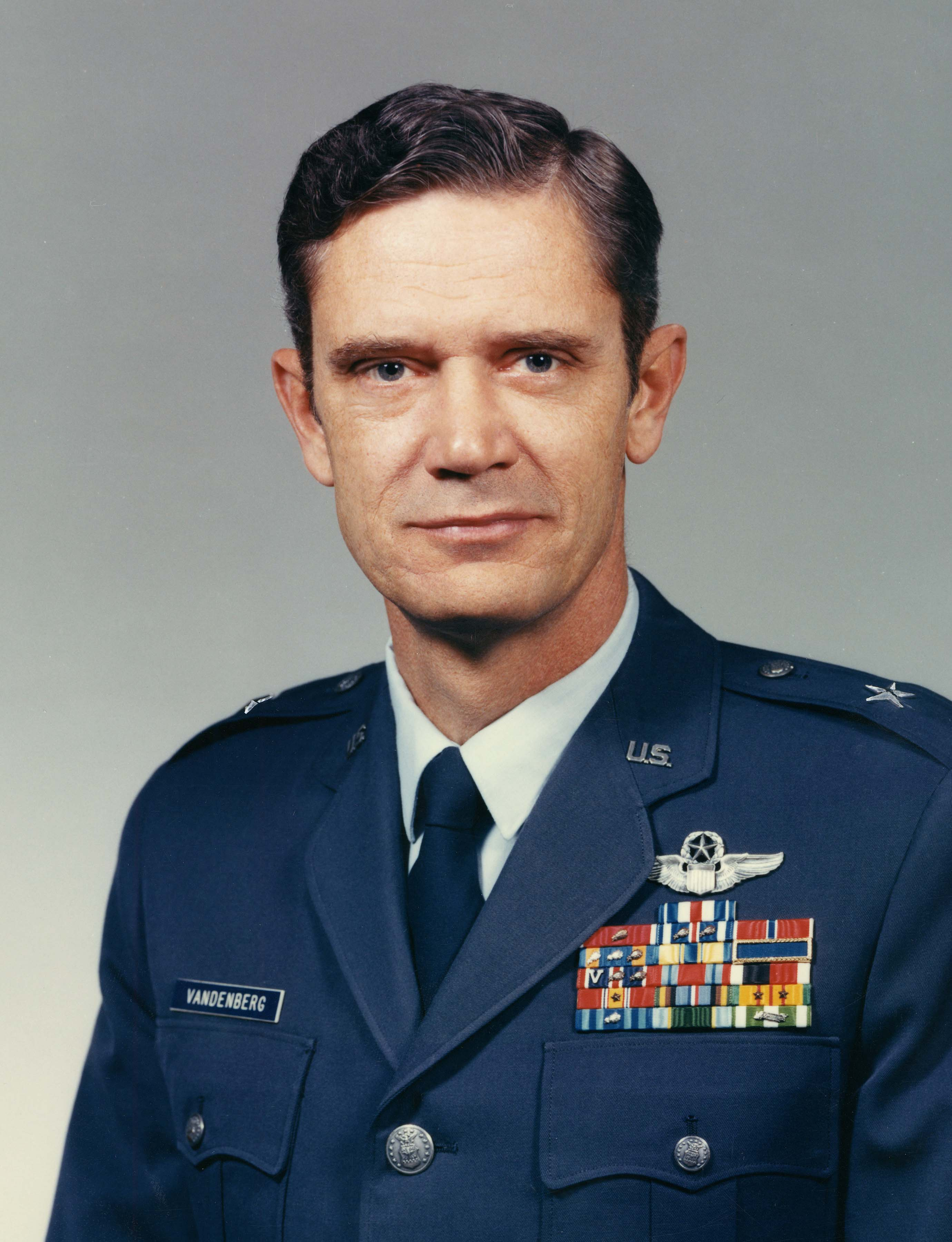
- Hoyt Vandenberg Jr. pictured as brigadier general as Commandant of the United States Air Force Academy, c. 1970s
- Born: August 12, 1928 (age 98); Riverside, California, U.S.
- Military career
- Allegiance: United States of America
- Branch: United States Air Force
- Service years: 1951–1981
- Rank: Major General
- Commands: United States Air Force Academy; 12th Flying Training Wing; 390th Tactical Fighter Squadron
- Conflicts: Vietnam War
- Awards: Air Force Distinguished Service Medal (2); Silver Star; Legion of Merit (3); Distinguished Flying Cross (3); Bronze Star Medal; Air Medal (12)

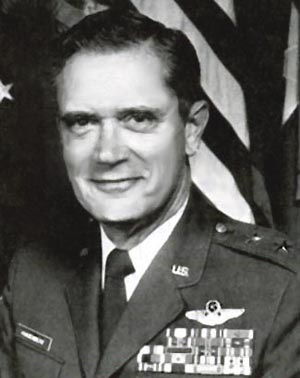
Major General Hoyt S. Vandenberg Jr

Hoyt Sanford Vandenberg Jr. (born August 12, 1928) is a retired major general in the United States Air Force.

== Early life and education ==
Vandenberg was born in Riverside, California, on August 12, 1928, to Dutch parents. His father was General Hoyt Vandenberg and his great uncle was U.S. Senator Arthur H. Vandenberg. Vandenberg obtained a Master of Science degree in international relations from George Washington University in 1969.

== Military career ==
Vandenberg graduated from the United States Military Academy in 1951 (where Buzz Aldrin was one of his classmates). In 1953, Vandenberg was assigned to the 86th Fighter-Bomber Wing. Later he would serve as a flight commander with the 413th Tactical Fighter Wing and the 31st Tactical Fighter Wing. He graduated from the Air Command and Staff College in 1961, after which he was assigned to the 4th Tactical Fighter Wing. In 1963, Vandenberg was appointed operations officer with the 23rd Tactical Fighter Squadron. During the Vietnam War, Vandenberg commanded the 390th Tactical Fighter Squadron. Upon returning stateside he was assigned to The Pentagon to work in the Office of the Director of Plans. He would graduate from the National War College in 1969 and return to The Pentagon to work with the Joint Chiefs of Staff. In 1971, Vandenberg became commander of the 12th Flying Training Wing. Vandenberg was named Vice Commandant of Cadets at the United States Air Force Academy in 1972. He would serve as Commandant from 1973 to 1975, during which time he assumed the rank of brigadier general. From 1976 to 1979, Vandenberg served at Headquarters U.S. Air Force, first as Deputy Director of Plans, later as Director of Operations and Readiness, and finally as Assistant Deputy Chief of Staff for Operations, Plans, and Readiness. Vandenberg was ultimately named Vice Commander in Chief of the Pacific Air Forces. His retirement was effective as of January 1, 1981.

== Awards and decorations ==
Command Pilot badge
Office of the Joint Chiefs of Staff Identification Badge

Air Force Distinguished Service Medal with one bronze oak leaf cluster
Silver Star
Legion of Merit with two bronze oak leaf clusters
Distinguished Flying Cross with two oak leaf clusters
Bronze Star Medal
Air Medal with two silver and one bronze oak leaf clusters
Air Force Commendation Medal
Air Force Presidential Unit Citation
Air Force Outstanding Unit Award with Valor device and two oak leaf clusters
Combat Readiness Medal
Army of Occupation Medal
National Defense Service Medal with one bronze service star
Armed Forces Expeditionary Medal
Vietnam Service Medal with two service stars
Air Force Longevity Service Award with silver and bronze oak leaf clusters
Small Arms Expert Marksmanship Ribbon
Vietnam Gallantry Cross Unit Citation
Vietnam Campaign Medal

Inducted in the National Aviation Hall of Fame in Dayton, Ohio.

== Meeting Charles Lindbergh ==
In an interview with journalist David Leighton, published in the Arizona Daily Star newspaper, on May 27, 2014, Vandenberg shared this story about meeting well-known aviator Charles Lindbergh:

In 1949, on summer leave from West Point, I flew with my father to Europe to visit some of the headquarters he had during World War II. Aboard the aircraft was Charles Lindbergh, with whom I had an all-night visit. He had refused a bunk and told me he had trouble sleeping over the Atlantic ever since his famous solo flight. I wasn't about to sleep and pass up the chance to talk to him. We talked all night. He was very interested in the type of girls that West Point graduates married. It was almost as though he felt the offspring of graduates should perpetuate the sterling qualities embodied in our motto, "Duty, Honor, Country."
