= 301st Fighter Squadron =

US Air Force unit

301st Fighter Squadron

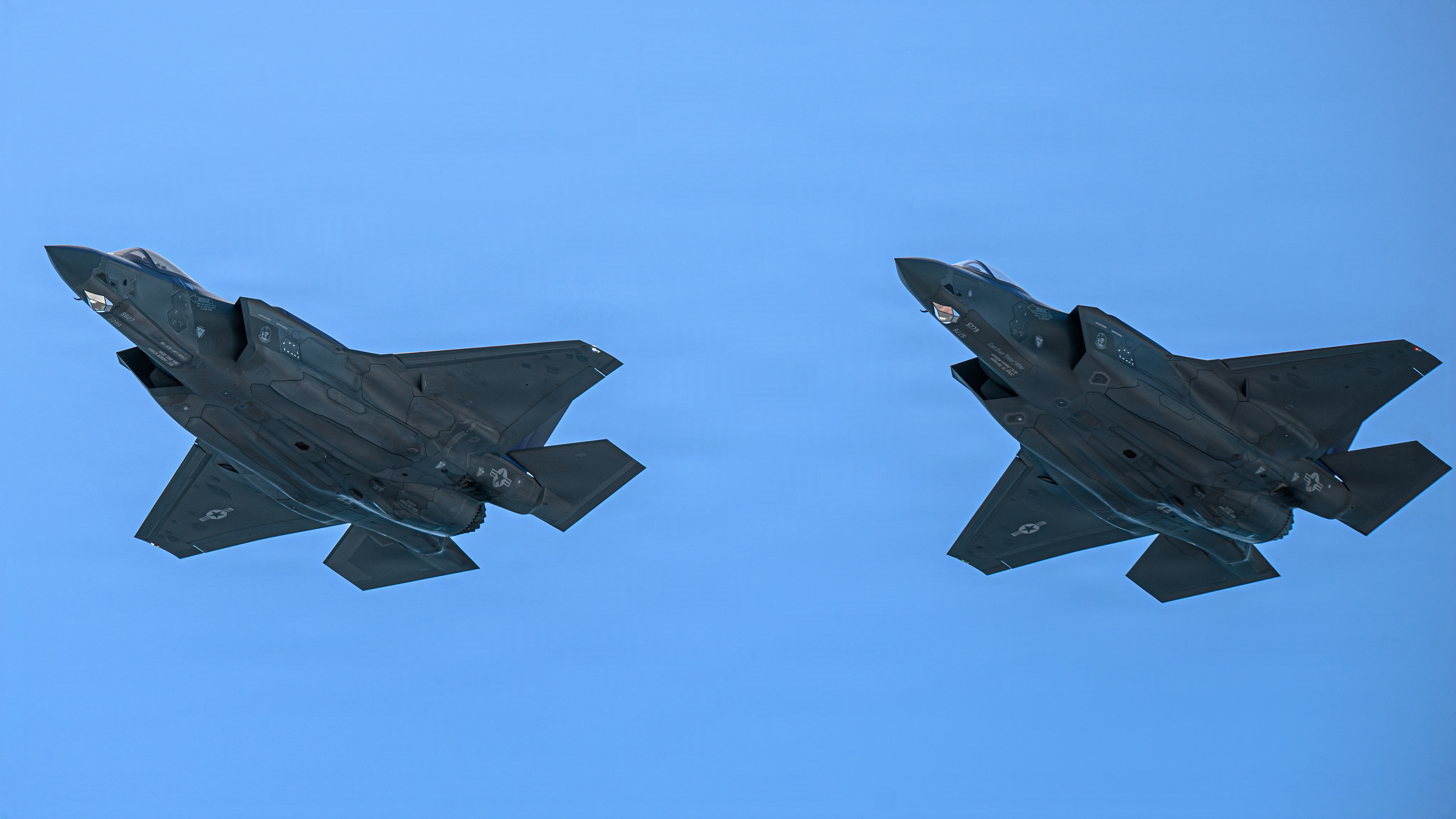
- Two U.S. Air Force F-35A Lightning II aircraft assigned to the 95th Fighter Squadron perform during the Gulf Coast Salute Air Show at Panama City Beach, Florida, April 11, 2026.
- Active: 1942–1945; 1947–1949; 1958–1969; 2000 – present
- Country: United States
- Branch: United States Air Force
- Role: Fighter training
- Part of: Air Force Reserve Command
- Garrison/HQ: Tyndall AFB, Florida
- Motto: First – Tops (1958–1969)
- Engagements: Mediterranean Theater of Operations
- Decorations: Distinguished Unit Citation; Air Force Outstanding Unit Award

Commanders
- Current commander: Lt Col Brandon “Rebel” Harris

Insignia
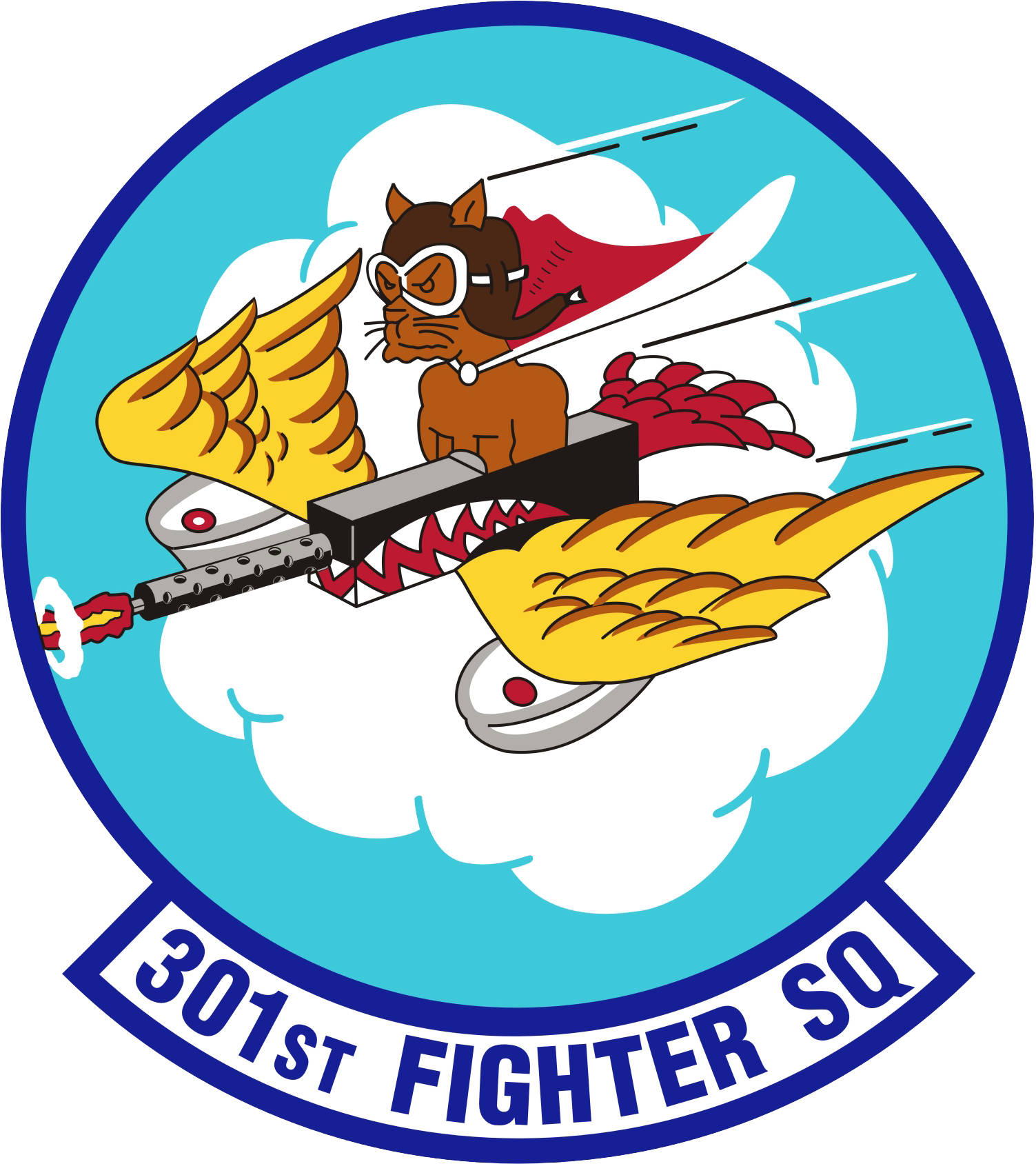
- 301st Fighter Squadron emblem (Note: Approved 29 June 1945. Description: On a light turquoise blue disc, edged black, a caricatured cat wearing a red cape, brown aviator's helmet and white goggles, piloting a gray .50 caliber aerial machine gun with red and white tail, winged yellow orange, with an auxiliary gray wing tank under each wing, all in flight toward dexter, in front of a large white cloud formation.)

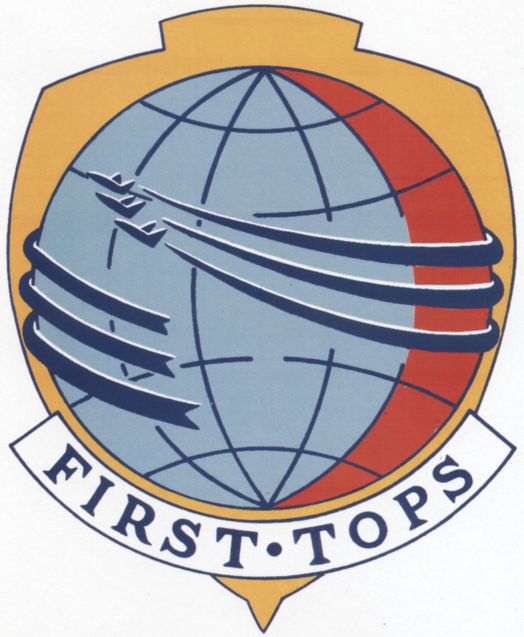
- 901st Air Refueling Squadron emblem

The 301st Fighter Squadron is a United States Air Force Reserve squadron, assigned to the 325th Operations Group, stationed at Tyndall Air Force Base, Florida. It is an associate unit of the active duty 325th Fighter Wing.

The squadron was first activated as the 301st Fighter Squadron during World War II as part of the famous Tuskegee Airmen. It saw combat in the Mediterranean Theater of Operations and earned a Distinguished Unit Citation for its actions. The squadron was inactivated in 1945, but activated again at Lockbourne Army Air Base, Ohio in 1947. It was inactivated in 1949 after President Harry S. Truman issued Executive Order 9981 ending segregation in the Armed Forces, and its personnel reassigned to other units.

In 1958 USAF activated the 901st Air Refueling Squadron, flying Boeing KC-135 Stratotankers at Columbus Air Force Base, Mississippi. It performed air refueling and deployed to the Pacific to support operations in Southeast Asia until it was inactivated eleven years later. In 1985 the 301st was consolidated with this unit.

In 1999, the consolidated unit was again designated the 301st Fighter Squadron and activated as a fighter pilot training squadron with General Dynamics F-16 Fighting Falcons at Luke Air Force Base. In 2007 it moved from Luke to Holloman and assumed a combat mission, flying the F-22 Raptor. In 2014, the Squadron moved, along with the rest of Holloman's F-22 fleet, to Tyndall Air Force Base.

In June 2023, The 44 FG began its transition from the F-22 Raptor to the F-35 Lightning II. Together, the 301st and 95th Fighter Squadrons support Air Combat Command missions.

== History ==
=== World War II ===
The 301st was one of four African-American fighter squadrons to enter combat during World War II.

One of the famous all-black squadrons of the 332d Fighter Group, it was activated on 19 February 1942 at Tuskegee Army Air Field, Alabama, but remained largely unmanned until it arrived at Selfridge Field, Michigan late in March 1943. There it received a full complement of personnel and the squadron began operational training with Bell P-39 Airacobra and Curtiss P-40 Warhawk aircraft. The unit completed training in December 1943 and prepared to move overseas.

The squadron sailed in early January 1944 aboard the SS William Few and arrived in Italy in early February 1944, becoming part of the Twelfth Air Force in the Mediterranean Theater of Operations. The 301st flew its first combat mission on 19 February 1944. The squadron became engaged in various missions, including harbor protection, point-to-point patrol, convoy escort, and armed reconnaissance. It also performed air rescue and strafing missions. In May 1944 the 301st was reassigned to the Fifteenth Air Force and thereafter the squadron's primary duty was providing escort for bombers striking enemy oil and industrial targets in central Europe and the Balkans. Although initially equipped with Bell P-39 Airacobra and Republic P-47 Thunderbolt aircraft, in June 1944 the squadron received P-51 aircraft which they retained throughout the remainder of the war.

In August 1944, the unit attacked enemy positions on the French coast in preparation for the invasion of southern France. They escorted bombers of the Fifteenth Air Force in attacks on the assault beaches on 15 August 1944. After this they returned to escorting heavy bombers to targets in Germany, Austria, Czechoslovakia, and Romania. They also attacked targets of opportunity, including enemy airdromes, troop concentrations, communications lines, and enemy aircraft when the opportunity arose. The unit received a Distinguished Unit Citation for its performance during an escort to Berlin on 24 March 1945. The squadron, along with other squadrons of the 332d group, fought off a large enemy force, including Me 262 jets, allowing the bomber formation to complete their mission. The 301st flew its last mission in Europe on 30 April 1945. On 30 September 1945, the 301st sailed for the United States aboard the SS Levi Woodbury and arrived at Camp Kilmer, New Jersey on 17 October 1945. The squadron was inactivated on 19 October 1945.

=== Cold War ===
==== 301st Fighter Squadron ====
The 301st trained with Republic P-47 Thunderbolt aircraft between 1947 and 1949 at Lockbourne Air Force Base, Ohio. It participated in firepower demonstrations, gunnery training and operational missions to maintain its combat proficiency. In 1949, the 332d wing participated in the National Gunnery Meet at Las Vegas Air Force Base, Nevada, taking first place in the conventional aircraft portion of the competition.

In 1948 President Harry S. Truman issued Executive Order 9981 ending segregation in the Armed Forces. In response, the Air Force inactivated the all black 332d Fighter Wing and its units, including the 301st, on 1 July 1949 and reassigned its personnel to previously all white units. Lockbourne was closed and turned over to the Ohio Air National Guard. Captain Alva Temple of the 301st was one of the two pilots on the team and placed second overall in the fighter pilot individual competition. He scored perfect scores in two of the meet's five events, skip bombing and rocketry.

On 19 September 1985, the Air Force consolidated the 301st Fighter Squadron with the 901st Air Refueling Squadron, but it remained inactive.

==== 901st Air Refueling Squadron ====
The 901st Air Refueling Squadron was activated at Columbus Air Force Base, Mississippi on 1 August 1958 as the first operational squadron of the 4228th Strategic Wing, which had been activated the previous month. The 4228th wing had been activated as part of Strategic Air Command (SAC)'s program to disperse its Boeing B-52 Stratofortress force, making it less vulnerable to a Soviet Union first strike.

The squadron was equipped with Boeing KC-135 Stratotankers. The 901st concentrated on becoming combat ready before the wing's 492d Bombardment Squadron moved to Columbus from Carswell Air Force Base, Texas in June 1959. Starting in 1960, one third of the squadron's aircraft were maintained on fifteen-minute alert, fully fueled and ready for combat to reduce vulnerability to a Soviet missile strike. This was increased to half the squadron's aircraft in 1962. The squadron continued to maintain an alert commitment until it was inactivated, with the exception of the periods it deployed to the Pacific.

The 901st provided air refueling to Boeing B-52 Stratofortresses on a worldwide basis, and to other aircraft as required. On 1 February 1963, the 454th Bombardment Wing assumed the aircraft, personnel and equipment of the discontinued 4228th wing. The 4228th was a Strategic Air Command (SAC) Major Command controlled (MAJCON) unit and could not carry a permanent history or lineage. With this change the 901st was reassigned to the newly activated 454th wing.

Between 1965 and the end of 1968, the squadron frequently deployed to the Pacific to support combat operations with refueling over the Gulf of Tonkin and South China Sea. In July 1969, the 454th wing was inactivated as older model B-52s were removed from the inventory and Columbus was transferred to Air Training Command. The squadron was inactivated along with the wing. In September 1985 the 301st Fighter Squadron was consolidated with the 901st, but the unit remained inactive.

=== Southeast Asia ===
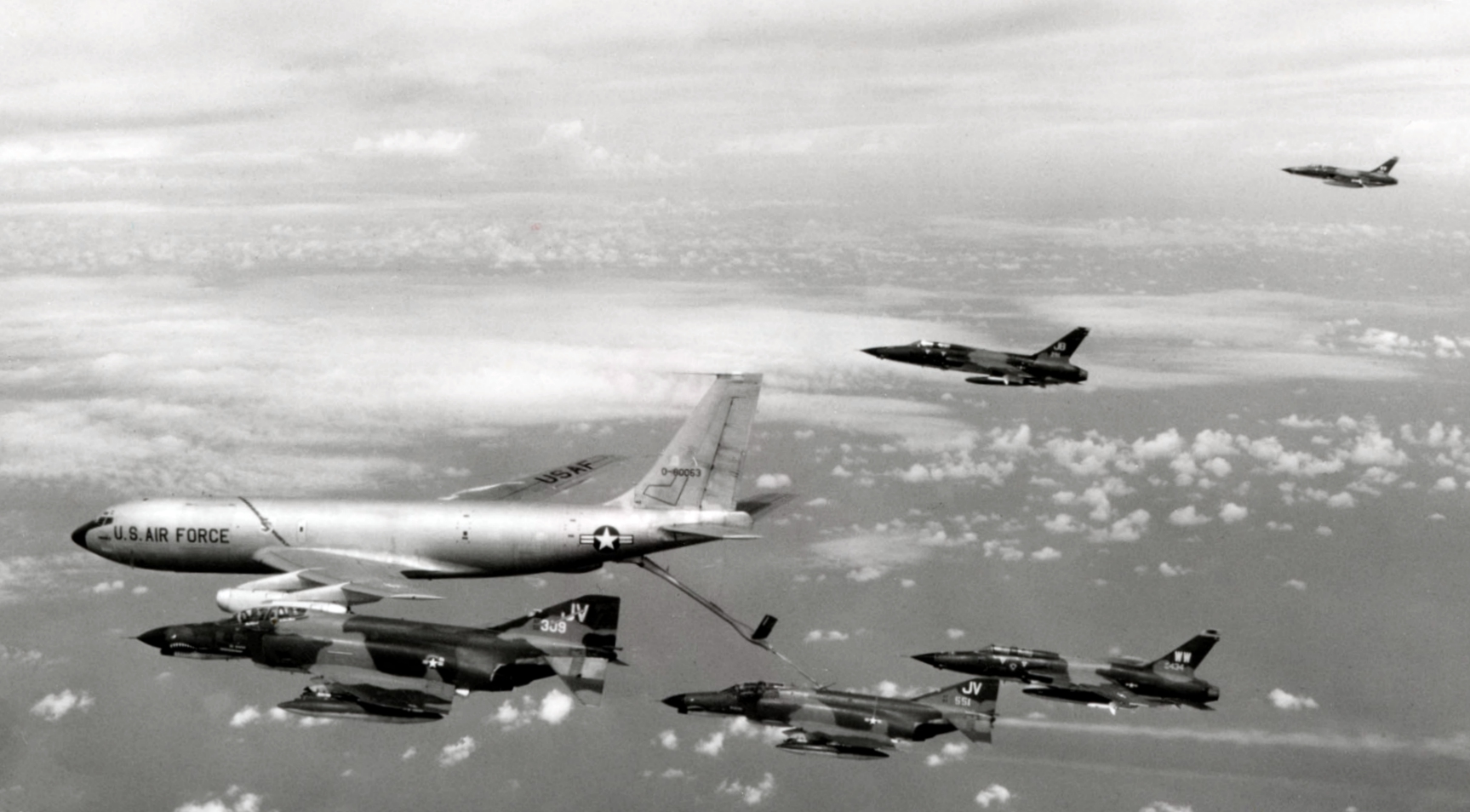
KC-135A refueling F-4E Phantom IIs and F-105G Thunderchief Wild Weasels over Thailand in 1972

.

On 1 June 1972 SAC expanded its forces at U-Tapao Royal Thai Navy Airfield, Thailand by forming a provisional air division and two provisional wings. The Strategic Wing, Provisional, 310th had two operational squadrons, one of which was the Air Refueling Squadron, Provisional, 901st. This squadron was manned and equipped with aircrews and KC-135s deployed from SAC units in the United States. Despite the similarity in its designation, the provisional squadron is not related to the 901st Air Refueling Squadron.

The provisional squadron flew combat operations as part of Operation Young Tiger at the end of the Vietnam War and during expeditionary combat operations over Cambodia and Laos between 1972 and August 1973. It supported United States tactical forces in Thailand from 1973 to 1976 including Operation Eagle Pull, the evacuation of United States citizens from Phnom Penh, Cambodia in March 1975. On 1 July 1974 the provisional 310th wing was inactivated and the squadron was attached to the 307th Strategic Wing. SAC operations in Thailand continued to be reduced and the 307th was inactivated on 30 September 1975. The provisional 901st was then attached to the 17th Air Division and supported the withdrawal of SAC aircraft from Thailand until it was inactivated on 20 March 1976.

=== Modern era ===
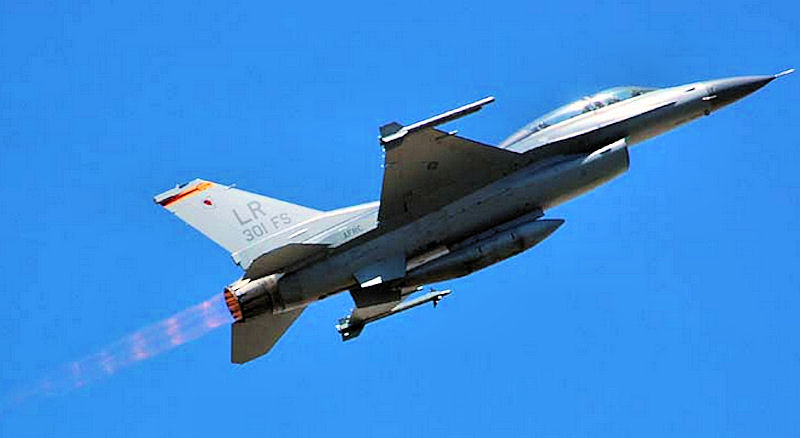
F-16 of the 301st Fighter Squadron taking off from Luke AFB

The squadron resumed its name as the 301st Fighter Squadron and was reactivated as an element of Air Force Reserve Command at Luke AFB, Arizona. It became a General Dynamics F-16 Fighting Falcon flying training squadron, part of the 944th Fighter Wing. Sixty-four Air Force Reserve Command pilots integrated with the 56th Operations Group fighter squadrons providing instruction to teach the F-16 pilots for the combat air forces. The 56th Fighter Wing was one of the first units to integrate Reservists into its flying operation in 2000.

As a tenant unit at Luke the 301st's F-16s carried the LR (Luke Reserve) tail code as opposed to the LF of the host 56th Fighter Wing. The squadron operated Block 32 F-16C/D models in the air to ground role until losing its aircraft as a result of 2005 Base Realignment and Closure Commission decisions. The reserve F-16s were transferred to Nellis Air Force Base, Nevada; Tucson Air National Guard Base, Arizona and Fresno Air National Guard Base, California. The 301st pilots continued to teach active duty student pilots.

During 2007 the Air Force decided that the Tuskegee Airmen heritage should be preserved with a unit flying the new F-22 Raptor. As a result, on 9 March 2010, the 301st Fighter Squadron transferred its mission, personnel and equipment to the 69th Fighter Squadron which simultaneously activated at Luke. The event marked the end of almost a decade of Tuskegee heritage at Luke.

The 301st Fighter Squadron moved to Holloman Air Force Base, New Mexico and was assigned to the reserve 44th Fighter Group on 9 April 2010. Preparation for the move began as early as December 2008, when the first reservists were assigned to Detachment 1, 301st Fighter Squadron at Holloman. The reservists of the 301st were integrated with Regular Air Force members of the 49th Fighter Wing and operated and maintained the same aircraft.

In 2014, the squadron moved again, along with the rest of Holloman's F-22 fleet, to Tyndall Air Force Base, Florida. As they were at Holloman, the 301st remains part of the 44th Fighter Group, but now integrated with the 325th Fighter Wing, the tenant Regular Air Force host wing at Tyndall Air Force Base.

Following the destruction of Tyndall AFB due to Hurricane Michael in October 2018, 325 FW Formal Training Unit (FTU) flight operations with the F-22 and T-38 relocated to Eglin AFB, Florida with instructor pilots and maintenance personnel of the 44 FG including, the 301st Fighter Squadron following suit.

With the F-22A FTU mission slated to transfer to the 1st Fighter Wing (1 FW) at Joint Base Langley-Eustis, Virginia, and the transition of both the 325 FW and the 44 FG's "parent" AFRC wing, the 301 FW, to the F-35A Lightning II, the 301st Fighter Squadron would also transition to the F-35A and eventually locate back to Tyndall AFB in 2023. In lieu of Tyndall's ACC mission, the 44th Fighter Group became a combat coded F-35A Associate unit to the 325 Fighter Wing.

== Lineage ==
301st Fighter Squadron

- Constituted as the 301st Fighter Squadron on 4 July 1942

Activated on 13 October 1942
Redesignated 301st Fighter Squadron, Single Engine c. 21 August 1944
Inactivated on 19 October 1945

- Activated on 1 July 1947

Inactivated on 1 July 1949

- Consolidated on 19 September 1985 with the 901st Air Refueling Squadron, Heavy as the 901st Air Refueling Squadron, Heavy' (remained inactive)

901st Air Refueling Squadron

Constituted as the 901st Air Refueling Squadron, Heavy on 7 April 1958
Activated on 1 August 1958
Inactivated on 2 July 1969

- Consolidated on 19 September 1985 with the 301st Fighter Squadron
- Redesignated 301st Fighter Squadron on 1 December 1999

Activated in the Reserve on 1 January 2000

=== Assignments ===
- 332d Fighter Group, 13 October 1942 – 19 October 1945
- 332d Fighter Group, 1 July 1947 – 1 July 1949
- 4228th Strategic Wing, 1 August 1958
- 454th Bombardment Wing, 1 February 1963 – 2 July 1969 (attached to 4252d Strategic Wing, December 1965 – March 1966 and July 1967 – December 1967)
- 944th Operations Group, 1 January 2000
- 44th Fighter Group, 9 April 2010 – present

=== Stations ===
- Tuskegee Army Air Field, Alabama, 13 October 1942
- Selfridge Field, Michigan, 29 March 1943
- Oscoda Army Air Field, Michigan, 9 November 1943
- Selfridge Field, Michigan, 19 November 1943 – 23 December 1943
- Torretto Airfield, Italy, 29 January 1944
- Montecorvino Airfield, Italy, 8 February 1944
- Capodichino Airfield, Italy, 15 April 1944
- Ramitelli Airfield, Italy, 30 May 1944
- Cattolica Airfield, Italy, c. 4 May 1945
- Lucera Airfield, Italy, c. 18 July 1945 – 30 September 1945
- Camp Kilmer, New Jersey, 17–19 October 1945
- Lockbourne Army Air Base (later Lockbourne Air Force Base), Ohio, 1 July 1947 – 1 July 1949
- Columbus Air Force Base, Mississippi, 1 August 1958 – 2 July 1969
- Luke Air Force Base, Arizona, 1 January 2000
- Holloman Air Force Base, New Mexico, 9 April 2010 – December 2013
- Tyndall Air Force Base, Florida, January 2014 – present

=== Aircraft ===
- Bell P-39 Airacobra (1943–1944)
- Curtiss P-40 Warhawk (1943–1944)
- Republic P-47 (later F-47) Thunderbolt (1944, 1947–1949)
- North American P-51 Mustang (1944–1945)
- Boeing KC-135 Stratotanker (1958–1969)
- General Dynamics F-16 Fighting Falcon (2000–2010)
- F-22A Raptor, 2010 –2023
- F-35 Lightning II, 2024–present

=== Awards and campaigns ===
Award streamer	Award	Dates	Notes
	Distinguished Unit Citation	24 March 1945 Germany	301st Fighter Squadron
	Air Force Outstanding Unit Award	6 October 1959 – 15 July 1960	901st Air Refueling Squadron
	Air Force Outstanding Unit Award	1 July 1965 – 31 July 1965; 1 December 1965 – 1 March 1966	901st Air Refueling Squadron
	Air Force Outstanding Unit Award	2 March 1966 – 1 April 1966; 1 July 1967 – 31 December 1967	901st Air Refueling Squadron
	Air Force Outstanding Unit Award	1 July 1968 – 1 December 1968	901st Air Refueling Squadron
	Air Force Outstanding Unit Award	[1 January 2000] – 5 September 2000	301st Fighter Squadron
	Air Force Outstanding Unit Award	1 July 2005 – 30 September 2006	301st Fighter Squadron
	Air Force Outstanding Unit Award	1 July 2006 – 30 September 2007	301st Fighter Squadron

Campaign Streamer	Campaign	Dates	Notes
	Rome-Arno	22 January 1944 – 9 September 1944	301st Fighter Squadron
	Southern France	15 August 1944 – 14 September 1944	301st Fighter Squadron
	North Apennines	10 September 1944 – 4 April 1945	301st Fighter Squadron
	Po Valley	3 April 1945 – 8 May 1945	301st Fighter Squadron
	Normandy	6 June 1944 – 24 July 1944	301st Fighter Squadron
	Northern France	25 July 1944 – 14 September 1944	301st Fighter Squadron
	Rhineland	15 September 1944 – 21 March 1945	301st Fighter Squadron
	Central Europe	22 March 1944 – 21 May 1945	301st Fighter Squadron
	Air Combat, EAME Theater	7 December 1941 – 11 May 1945	301st Fighter Squadron

== See also ==
- Tuskegee Airmen
- List of MAJCOM wings of the United States Air Force
