= 68th Missile Squadron =

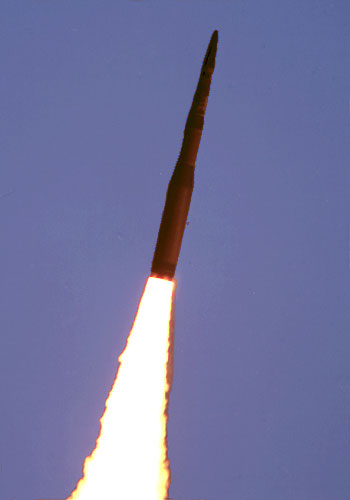
- LGM-30F Minuteman II test launch at Vandenberg AFB, California
- Active: 1940-1946; 1947-1948; 1951-1960; 1962-1994
- Country: United States
- Branch: United States Air Force
- Type: Squadron
- Role: Intercontinental ballistic missile
- Engagements: World War II (American Campaign) (EAME Theater)

- Decorations: Distinguished Unit Citation (2x) Air Force Outstanding Unit Award

Insignia
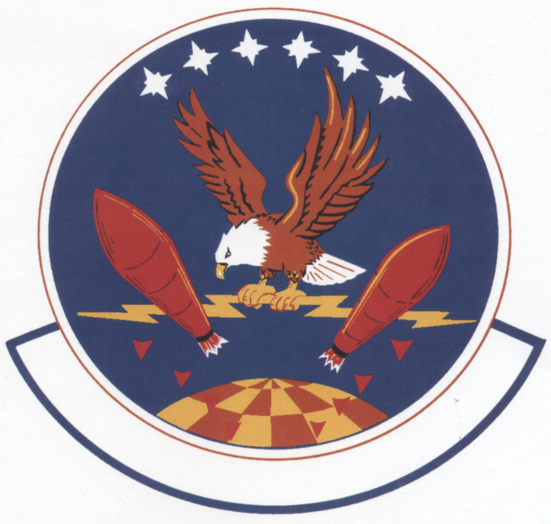
- 68th Missile Squadron emblem

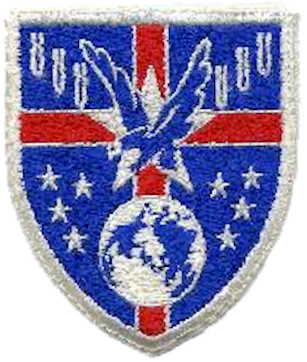
- Patch with 68th Bombardment Squadron emblem (Note: Approved 18 February 1952. Description: On a shield sky blue, between a cross red, edged white, in the two upper quarters, six bombs, points downward, three on either side of the cross, white, shaded blue, in the two lower quarters eight stars, four on each side of the cross, white, markings blue, in base over the cross a sphere white, markings blue, over the center of the cross a star white. thereover an eagle flying blue, markings white.)

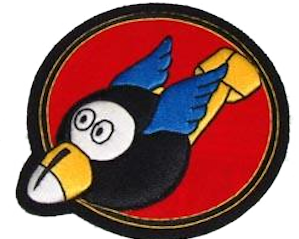
- 68th Bombardment Squadron emblem (World War II) (Note: In England during World War II, the four squadrons of the 44th Bombardment Group used the same 8 Ball emblem with the squadron color on the tip of the nose. Watkins, pp. 32-33)

The 68th Missile Squadron is an inactive United States Air Force unit. It was last assigned to the 44th Operations Group, stationed at Ellsworth Air Force Base, South Dakota.

The 68th was equipped with the LGM-30F Minuteman II intercontinental ballistic missile, with a mission of nuclear deterrence. With the end of the Cold War, the 68th was inactivated on 5 July 1994.

== History ==
=== World War II ===
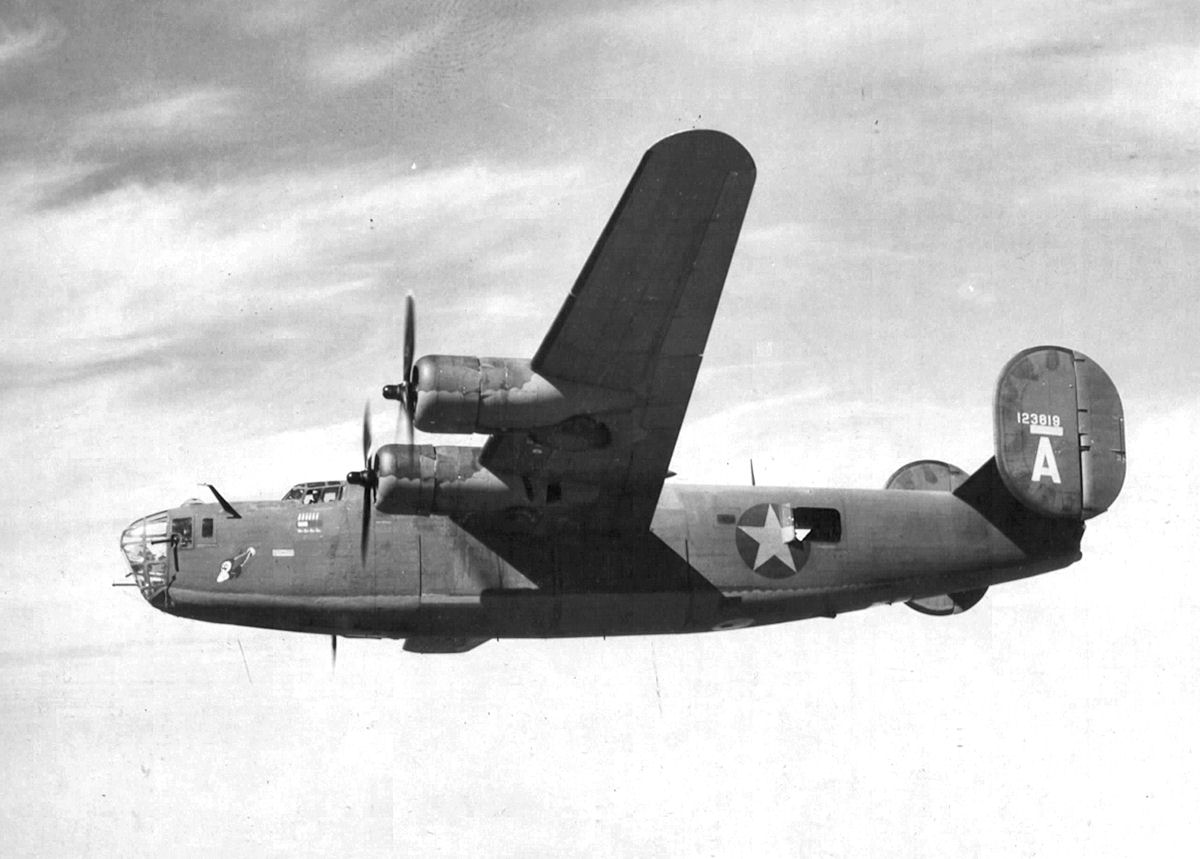
Squadron B-24D Liberator (Note: Aircraft is Consolidated B-24D-5-CO Liberator, serial 41-23819. This plane was lost on the 14 May 1943 mission to Kiel, Germany.)

The squadron was first activated in January 1941 as the 68th Bombardment Squadron at MacDill Field, Florida as one of the original squadrons of the 44th Bombardment Group. The squadron was equipped with Consolidated B-24 Liberators. Following the Japanese attack on Pearl Harbor, the squadron began to participate in antisubmarine patrols. Although the squadron briefly became an Operational Training Unit in February 1942, it began intensive training for deployment to the European Theater of Operations in July.

It deployed to the European Theater of Operations (ETO), where it was assigned to VIII Bomber Command in England during the summer of 1942. One of the first B-24 Liberator units assigned to the ETO, it was soon engaged in very long range strategic bombardment missions over Occupied Europe and Nazi Germany, attacking strategic targets in France, Belgium, the Netherlands and Germany. Among the targets attacked were submarine installations, industrial establishments, airfields, harbors and shipyards.

A detachment deployed to the Twelfth Air Force in Algeria in June 1943 to help facilitate the Allied invasion of Sicily by bombing airfields and marshalling yards in Italy. The detachment also participated in the low-level raid on the Ploiești oil fields in Romania on 1 August 1943. Most of the detachment returned to England at the end of August, however some crews and aircraft remained in the Mediterranean Theater of Operations and flew very long range attacks over Italy, Romania, Austria and Sicily and supported Allied ground forces in Sicily as well as attacking Axis forces in Italy opposing the Salerno landing. All aircraft and personnel returned to England in October.

The squadron returned to VIII Bomber Command operations, and supported the Allied Invasion of France in June 1944 by attacking strongpoints in the beachhead area and transportation targets behind the front line. The group aided the Caen offensive and the Saint-Lô breakthrough in July. It also dropped food, ammunition and other supplies to troops engaged in the airborne attack on the Netherlands in September. The unit attacked enemy targets during the Battle of the Bulge, December 1944-January 1945, by striking bridges, tunnels, rail and road junctions and communications in the battle area. The squadron attacked airfields and transportation in support of the Western Allied Invasion of Germany, and flew a resupply mission during the airborne assault across the Rhine in March 1945. Combat operations ceased with the German surrender in May 1945.

The squadron returned to the United States in June 1945, being reassigned to the Second Air Force and reorganized as a Boeing B-29 Superfortress very heavy bombardment unit. It trained with B-29s and planned to deploy to the Western Pacific, however the Japanese capitulation in August canceled these plans. It was assigned to Kansas as part of the Continental Air Forces (later Strategic Air Command or SAC), but it was inactivated in July 1946 as part of the general demobilization of the AAF.

=== Strategic Air Command ===
==== Bomber operations ====
The squadron was reactivated in 1947 under SAC as a paper unit; it was not manned or equipped and inactivated in 1949 due to budget constraints.

Reactivated once more in 1950, it was used as an operational training unit for B-29 aircrews and maintenance personnel. It was deployed to the Far East Air Forces during the Korean War. The unit replaced its propeller-driven B-29s with new Boeing B-47E Stratojet swept-wing medium bombers in 1953. These machines were capable of flying at high subsonic speeds and primarily designed for penetrating the airspace of the Soviet Union. In the late 1950s, the B-47 was considered to be reaching obsolescence, and was being phased out of SAC's strategic arsenal. The squadron began sending aircraft to other B-47 wings as replacements in late 1959, while being phased down for inactivation in 1960.

==== Intercontinental Ballistic Missile Squadron ====
68th Missile Squadron Launch Facilities

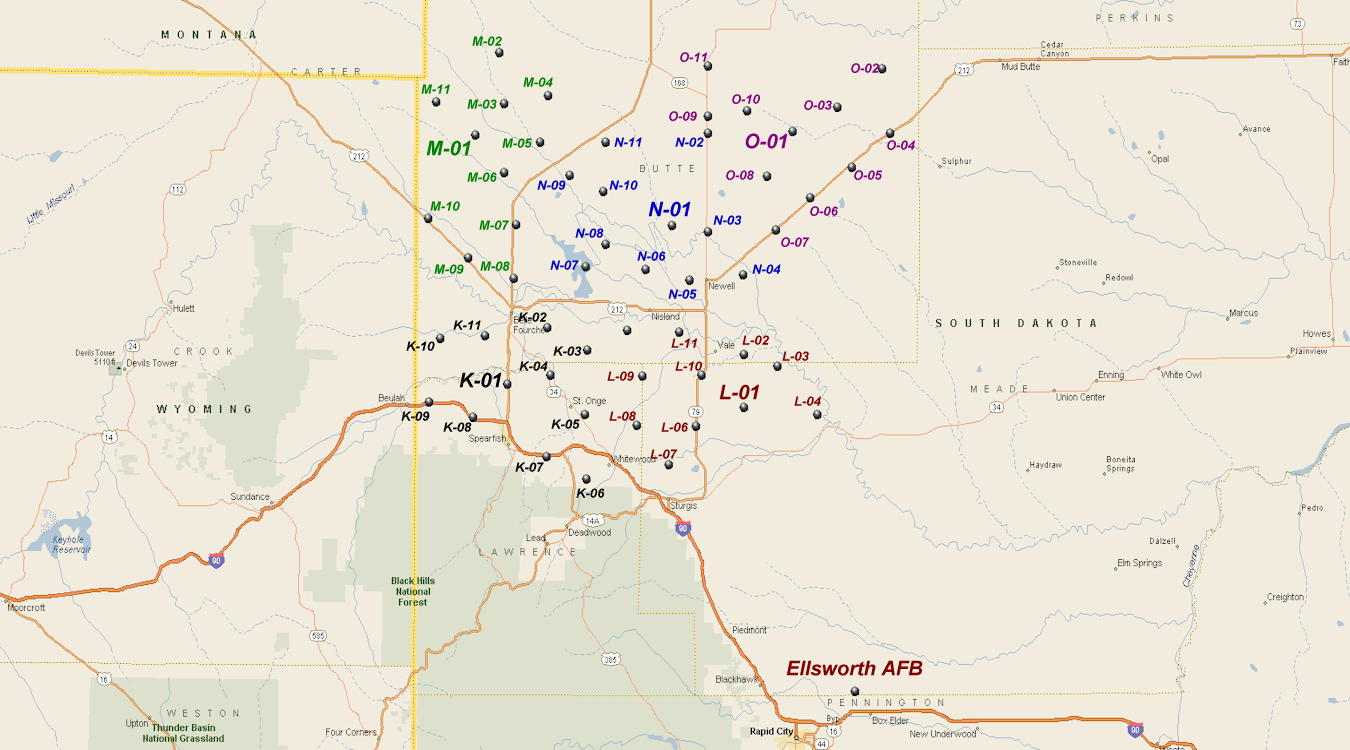
LGM-30 Minuteman Missile Alert and Launch Facilities

Missile Alert Facilities (K-O flights, each controlling 10 missiles) are located as follows:

K-01 5.6 mi N of Spearfish SD, 44°34′22″N 103°51′42″W
L-01 6.2 mi SxSE of Vale SD, 44°32′29″N 103°20′42″W
M-01 17.7 mi NxNW of Belle Fourche SD, 44°55′09″N 103°56′07″W
N-01 6.7 mi NW of Newell SD, 44°47′41″N 103°30′09″W
O-01 38.5 mi W of opal, SD, 44°55′29″N 103°14′13″W

The unit was reactivated in 1962 as a SAC intercontinental ballistic missile squadron. It trained with the 850th Strategic Missile Squadron in HGM-25A Titan I operations in 1962 and was made operational with LGM-30B Minuteman I missiles in 1963.

During March 1965 the squadron was responsible for the missile that was launched from a November Flight LF, 10 miles north of Newell, South Dakota. The program was called Project Longlife and was the only successful launch of a LGM-30 Minuteman missile from an operational site. The Project Longlife purpose was to test the launch capabilities from an operational site and to see how much damage the missile caused to the launch silo. The missile contained only enough fuel to burn for 7 seconds with a total flight time of 43 seconds. Many Minuteman missiles have been launched successfully from Vandenberg Air Force Base.

The squadron was upgraded to the LGM-30F Minuteman II in 1972. It was located just north of the Black Hills, South Dakota, as part of the 44th SMW.

The squadron was responsible for 50 missile silos, also called Launch Facilities, broken down into groups of 10. Each ten missile silos had a control center, or Launch Control Facility (LCF), where two missile officers were on duty 24 hours a day. These LCFs were named after the phonetic alphabet, starting with Kilo. Lima, Mike, November, and Oscar were the other LCFs. The LCFs were designated as "one", hence Kilo 1 was the LCF, and Kilo 2 through 11 represented the actual missile silos controlled from Kilo 1. In addition to being a normal LCF, Kilo 1 was also the Alternate Command Post. All of the other missile sites within the 44th Missile Wing (including the 66th and 67th Missile Squadrons reported to Kilo 1.

The squadron remained on Cold War nuclear alert until President Bush's directive to stand the Minuteman II down. It dissipated launch codes and pin safety control switches at 15 launch control facilities. Deactivation of the entire missile complex ended in the spring of 1994; the squadron was inactivated on 5 July.

===== Airborne Launch Control System =====
In 1967, the Airborne Launch Control System (ALCS) was created to provide a survivable launch capability for the Minuteman ICBM force. From 1967 to 1970, one of the squadrons that ALCS missile crews belonged to was the 68th. These crews worked together with the 28th Air Refueling Squadron, which operated several Boeing EC-135 variants to include the EC-135A, EC-135G, and EC-135L, all of which had ALCS equipment installed on board.

== Lineage ==
- Constituted as the 68th Bombardment Squadron (Heavy) on 20 November 1940

Activated on 15 January 1941
Redesignated 68th Bombardment Squadron, Heavy on 20 August 1943
Redesignated 68th Bombardment Squadron, Very Heavy on 5 August 1945
Inactivated on 12 July 1946
Activated on 1 July 1947
Inactivated on 6 September 1948
Redesignated 68th Bombardment Squadron, Medium on 20 December 1950
Activated on 2 January 1951
Discontinued on 15 June 1960
Redesignated 68th Strategic Missile Squadron on 19 March 1962
Organized on 1 September 1962
Redesignated 68th Missile Squadron on 1 September 1991
Inactivated on 1 July 1994

=== Assignments ===
- 44th Bombardment Group, 15 January 1941 – 12 July 1946
- 44th Bombardment Group, 1 July 1947 – 6 September 1948
- 44th Bombardment Group, 2 January 1951 (attached to 44th Bombardment Wing after 10 February 1951)
- 44th Bombardment Wing, 16 June 1952
- Department of the Air Force, 15 June 1960 (not organized)
- Strategic Air Command, 19 March 1962 (not organized)
- 44th Strategic Missile Wing, 1 July 1962
- 44th Operations Group, 1 September 1991 – 1 September 1993

=== Stations ===
- MacDill Field, Florida, 15 January 1941
- Barksdale Field, Louisiana, c. 7 February 1942
- Will Rogers Field, Oklahoma, c. 25 July-3 September 1942
- RAF Cheddington (Station 113), England, c. 12 September 1942
- RAF Shipdham (Station 115), England, c. 10 October 1942 – c. 15 June 1945
- Sioux Falls Army Air Field, South Dakota, 26 June 1945
- Great Bend Army Air Field, Kansas, 24 July 1945
- Smoky Hill Army Air Field, Kansas, c. 12 December 1945 – 12 July 1946
- Andrews Field (later Andrews Air Force Base), Maryland, 1 July 1947 – 6 September 1948
- March Air Force Base, California, 2 January 1951
- Lake Charles Air Force Base (later Chenault Air Force Base), Louisiana, c. 3 August 1951 – 15 June 1960
- Ellsworth Air Force Base, South Dakota, 1 September 1962 – 1 September 1993

=== Aircraft and missiles ===
- Consolidated B-24 Liberator, 1941–1945
- Boeing B-29 Superfortress, 1945–1946; 1951–1952
- Boeing B-47 Stratojet, 1953–1960
- LGM-30B Minuteman I, 1963–1973
- LGM-30F Minuteman II, 1972–1993

== See also ==
- List of United States Air Force missile squadrons
