= James R. McCarthy =

United States Air Force officer

James Russell McCarthy
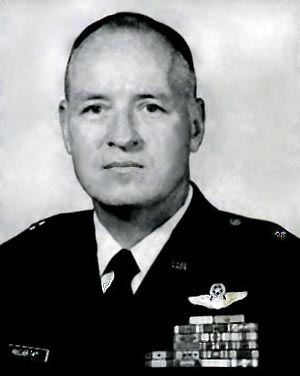
- Born: 3 September 1930; Memphis, Tennessee
- Died: 15 February 2024 (aged 93); San Antonio, Texas
- Burial place: Arlington National Cemetery
- Military career
- Allegiance: United States of America
- Branch: United States Air Force
- Service years: 1952-1980
- Rank: Brigadier general
- Commands: 43rd Strategic Wing; 303rd Consolidated Maintenance Wing; 42nd Air Division
- Conflicts: Vietnam War
- Awards: Air Force Cross; Legion of Merit (2); Distinguished Flying Cross (2); Bronze Star Medal (2); Air Medal (23); Republic of Vietnam Gallantry Cross

Brigadier general James Russell McCarthy (3 September 1930 - 15 February 2024) was a United States Air Force (USAF) officer.

== Early life and education ==
He was born in 1930, in Memphis, Tennessee. He graduated from Virginia Military Institute, Lexington, Virginia, in 1952 with a bachelor of science degree in civil engineering.

== Military career ==
He entered active duty in July 1952 as a squadron maintenance officer at Eglin Air Force Base, Florida. In January 1954 he graduated from pilot training at Reese Air Force Base, Texas. He then served as an instructor in nuclear physics at Randolph Air Force Base, Texas, from May 1954 to February 1956. While at Randolph he also had several flying assignments piloting Boeing B-17 Flying Fortresses, Boeing B-29 Superfortresses and Boeing B-50 Superfortresses.

He completed radar navigator's school for pilots in September 1956 and was then assigned to the 67th Bombardment Squadron, Strategic Air Command, at Chennault Air Force Base, Louisiana. He served there as a radar navigator, Boeing B-47 Stratojet aircraft commander and wing maintenance plans officer until May 1960. From May 1960 to October 1963, he served at Dow Air Force Base, Maine, as a Boeing B-52 Stratofortress aircraft commander and wing director of safety. In 1963 he was selected as aide-de-camp to the commander of Eighth Air Force, Westover Air Force Base, Massachusetts.

Upon graduation from the Air Command and Staff College in October 1965, he was assigned to the 309th Air Commando Squadron, Tan Son Nhut Air Base, South Vietnam, as a Fairchild C-123 Provider pilot and operations officer. Returning to the United States in October 1966, he served as a plans and programs officer and executive officer for the Directorate of Plans, Office of the Deputy Chief of Staff for Plans and Operations, Headquarters U.S. Air Force, Washington, D.C. He returned to South Vietnam for his second combat tour in May 1968. He served as a squadron commander, first in Saigon and later at Nha Trang Air Base. Following graduation from the Army War College in 1970, he was assigned to the Organization of the Joint Chiefs of Staff, Washington, D.C., as a staff assistant for arms control.

In September 1971 he was assigned as the deputy commander for operations, 416th Bombardment Wing, Griffiss Air Force Base, New York. While on this assignment he was sent on temporary duty to Southeast Asia as part of the Bullet Shot Task Force, where he served as a Boeing KC-135 Stratotanker squadron commander, assistant deputy chief of staff for operations and commander of the 310th Air Refueling Wing. He was assigned as vice commander, 43rd Strategic Wing at Andersen Air Force Base, Guam, in September 1972 and became wing commander in December 1972. The 43rd flew B-52D's in support of combat operations in Southeast Asia. While commander of the 43rd Strategic Wing, he was awarded the Air Force Cross for leading his wing in the largest B-52 raid against heavily defended targets in the Hanoi area during Operation Linebacker II on 26 December 1972. From June until November 1973, he was commander of the 303rd Consolidated Maintenance Wing. The 303rd was responsible for all maintenance on 150 B-52D's and B-52G's flown from Andersen Air Force Base in support of Operation Arc Light.

When the 303rd was deactivated he was again assigned as commander of the 43rd Strategic Wing. He served in this position until July 1974 when he moved to Offutt Air Force Base, Nebraska, as assistant deputy chief of staff, personnel, for Headquarters Strategic Air Command. He became commander of the 42nd Air Division at Blytheville Air Force Base, Arkansas, in May 1975. He was promoted to brigadier general on 1 July 1975, with date of rank of 19 June 1975. In July 1978 he was appointed as deputy for strategic, space and electronic programs, Air Force Acquisition Logistics Division, Air Force Logistics Command, Wright-Patterson Air Force Base, Ohio. He retired from the USAF in 1980.

He was a command pilot and a radar navigator with more than 7,000 hours of flying experience. He flew more than 1,200 combat missions in Southeast Asia in such diverse aircraft as the B-52, C-123, Lockheed C-130 Hercules, McDonnell Douglas F-4E Phantom II and KC-135.

== Later life ==
He was co-author of Linebacker II: A view from the rock, the official USAF history of Operation Linebacker II B-52 operations from Guam, first published in 1976.

He died on 15 February 2014 in San Antonio, Texas. He was buried at Arlington National Cemetery.

== Decorations ==
His military decorations and awards include the Air Force Cross, Legion of Merit with oak leaf cluster, Distinguished Flying Cross with oak leaf cluster, Bronze Star Medal with oak leaf cluster, Air Medal with 22 oak leaf clusters, Joint Service Commendation Medal with oak leaf cluster, Air Force Commendation Medal, Republic of Vietnam Gallantry Cross with palm and Republic of Vietnam Air Service Medal.
