= 66th Missile Squadron =

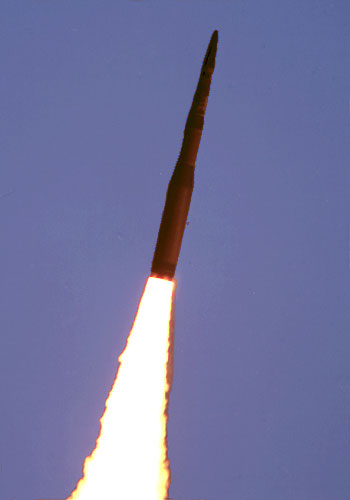
- LGM-30F Minuteman II test launch at Vandenberg AFB, California
- Active: 1940-1946; 1947-1948; 1950-1960; 1962-1993
- Country: United States
- Branch: United States Air Force
- Type: Squadron
- Role: Intercontinental ballistic missile
- Nickname: Flying 8 Balls (World War II)
- Motto: The Peace Keeper
- Engagements: World War II Antisubmarine (American Theater) European Theater of Operations

- Decorations: Distinguished Unit Citation (2x) Air Force Outstanding Unit Award (6x)

Insignia
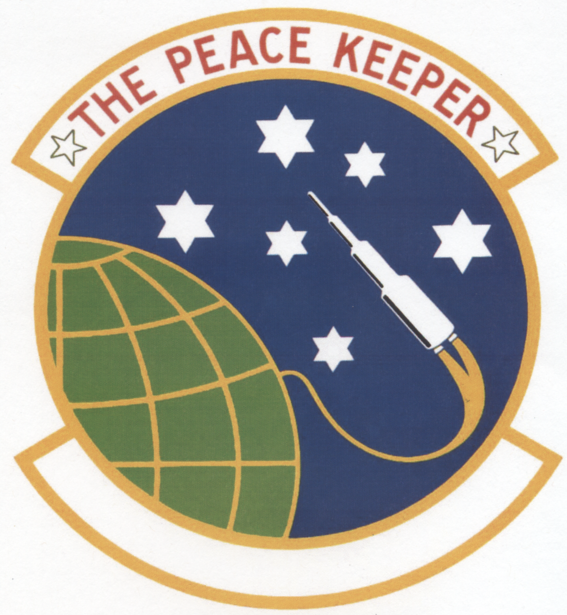
- 66th Missile Squadron emblem (Note: Approved 31 March 1970. Description: On a blue disc edged with a yellow border issuing from dexter base a green demi-sphere grid-lined yellow from which a white missile is ascending bendwise emitting a yellow arched vapor trail, the missile between six white six-pointed stars. Attached below the disc a blank white scroll edged yellow. Attached above the disc a white scroll edged yellow and inscribed [with the motto] in scarlet letters between two white stars edged black. Significance: The overall theme of the design illustrates the mission of the unit – to maintain the peace through deterrence and, if necessary, launch the force of missiles. The six stars, each with six points, symbolize the 66th Strategic Missile Squadron. The missile crossing the water illustrates the intercontinental nature of the force. The demi-globe is representative of the land mass over which the missiles traverse.)

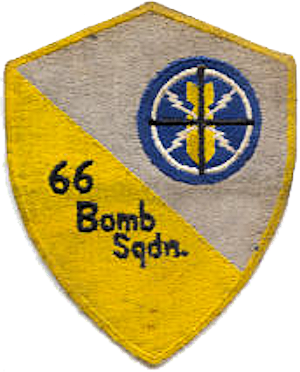
- Patch with 66th Bombardment Squadron emblem SAC era

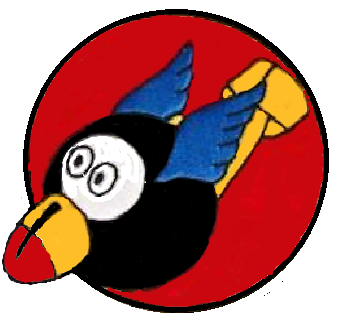
- 66th Bombardment Squadron emblem World War II
- World War II fuselage code: QK

The 66th Missile Squadron is an inactive United States Air Force unit. It was last assigned to the 44th Operations Group, stationed at Ellsworth Air Force Base, South Dakota. The 66th was equipped with the LGM-30F Minuteman II Intercontinental ballistic missile, with a mission of nuclear deterrence. With the end of the Cold War, the 66th was inactivated on 1 September 1993. Number of flights 100

== History ==
=== World War II ===
The squadron was first activated in January 1941 as the 66th Bombardment Squadron at MacDill Field, Florida as one of the original squadrons of the 44th Bombardment Group. The squadron was equipped with Consolidated B-24 Liberators. Following the Japanese attack on Pearl Harbor, the squadron began to participate in antisubmarine patrols. Although the squadron briefly became an Operational Training Unit in February 1942, it began intensive training for deployment to the European Theater of Operations in July.

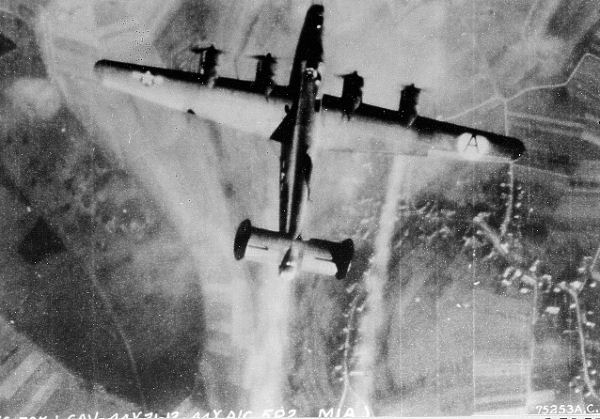
A 44th Bombardment Group B-24 Liberator

Deployed to the European Theater of Operations, being assigned to VIII Bomber Command in England during the summer of 1942. One of the first B-24 Liberator units assigned to the England. The squadron flew long range strategic bombardment missions over Occupied Europe and Germany, attacking strategic targets in France, Belgium, the Netherlands and Germany. Among the targets attacked were submarine installations, industrial establishments, airfields, harbors, shipyards, and other objectives.

A detachment deployed to Twelfth Air Force in Algeria in June 1943. It helped facilitate the Allied invasion of Sicily by bombing airfields and marshalling yards in Italy. It also participated in the famous low-level raid on the Ploiești oil fields in Romania on 1 August 1943. Most of the detachment returned to England at the end of August, however some crews and aircraft remained in the Mediterranean Theater of Operations (MTO) and flew very long range attacks over Italy, Romania, Austria, and Sicily and supported Allied ground forces in Sicily as well as attacking Axis forces in Italy supporting the Salerno Invasion of Italy. All aircraft and personnel returned to England in October.

Returned to VIII Bomber Command operations, and supported the Allied Invasion of France in June 1944 by attacking strong points in the beachhead area and transportation targets behind the front lines. The group aided the Caen offensive and the Saint-Lô breakthrough in July. Dropped food, ammunition, and other supplies to troops engaged in the airborne attack on the Netherlands in September. Attacked enemy targets during the Battle of the Bulge, December 1944-January 1945, by striking bridges, tunnels, choke points, rail and road junctions, and communications in the battle area. The squadron attacked airfields and transportation in support of the Western Allied Invasion of Germany, and flew a resupply mission during the airborne assault across the Rhine in March 1945. Combat operations concluded with the German Capitulation in May 1945.

Returned to the United States in June 1945, being reassigned to Second Air Force and reorganized as a Boeing B-29 Superfortress very heavy bombardment squadron. Trained with B-29s and planned to deploy to the Western Pacific, however the Japanese Capitulation in August canceled deployment plans. Stationed in Kansas as part of Continental Air Forces (later Strategic Air Command) but inactivated in July 1946 as part of the general demobilization of the AAF.

=== Strategic Air Command ===
Reactivated in 1947 under SAC as a paper unit; not manned or equipped and inactivated in 1949 due to budget constraints.

Reactivated in 1950 and used as an Operational Training Unit for B-29 aircrews and maintenance personnel being deployed to for Far East Air Forces during the Korean War. Replaced the propeller-driven B-29s with new Boeing B-47E Stratojet swept-wing medium bombers in 1953, capable of flying at high subsonic speeds and primarily designed for penetrating the airspace of the Soviet Union. In the late 1950s, the B-47 was considered to be reaching obsolescence, and was being phased out of SAC's strategic arsenal. Began sending aircraft to other B-47 wings as replacements in late 1959, being phased down for inactivation in 1960.

=== Intercontinental Ballistic Missile Squadron ===
66th Missile Squadron Launch Facilities Reactivated in 1962 as a SAC ICBM missile squadron. Trained with the 850th Strategic Missile Squadron in HGM-25A Titan I operations in 1962, being made operational with LGM-30B Minuteman I missiles in 1963. Upgraded to the LGM-30F Minuteman II in 1972. Remained on Cold War nuclear alert until in response to President Bush's directive to stand down the Minuteman II. Dissipated launch codes and pin safety control switches at 15 launch control facilities. Deactivation of the entire missile complex ended in the summer of 1993; squadron inactivated on 1 September.

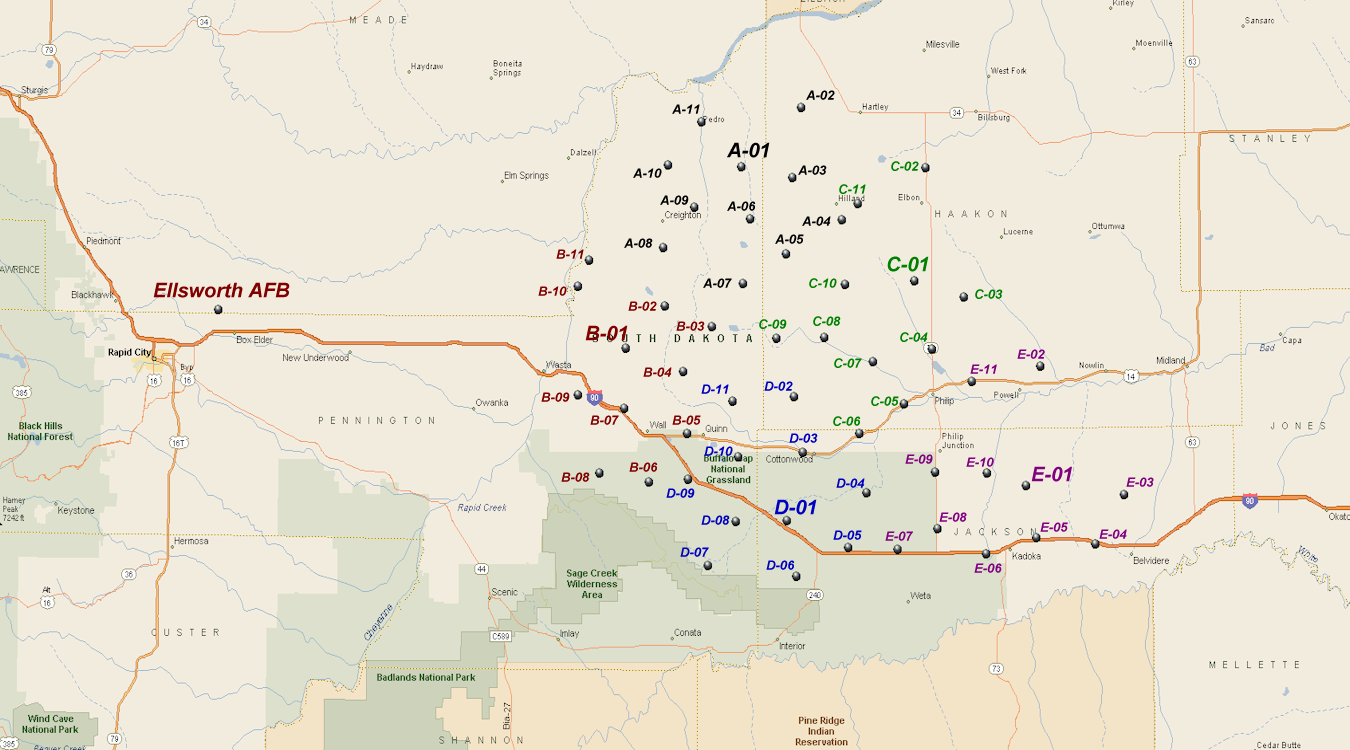
LGM-30 Minuteman Missile Alert and Launch Facilities

Missile Alert Facilities (A-E flights, each controlling 10 missiles) are located as follows:

A-01 19.9 mi S of Howes, SD, 44°19′52″N 102°03′03″W
B-01 7.5 mi NxNW of Wall SD, 44°05′56″N 102°17′01″W
C-01 10.1 mi N of Philip SD, 44°11′01″N 101°42′09″W
D-01 6.7 mi SxSW of Cottonwood SD, 43°52′40″N 101°57′42″W
E-01 6.3 mi NxNE of Kadoka SD, 43°55′12″N 101°28′52″W

=== Lineage ===
- Constituted as the 66th Bombardment Squadron (Heavy) on 20 November 1940

Activated on 15 Jan 1941
Redesignated 66th Bombardment Squadron, Heavy on 20 August 1943
Redesignated 66th Bombardment Squadron, Very Heavy on 5 August 1945
Inactivated on 12 July 1946
Activated on 1 July 1947
Inactivated on 6 September 1948
Redesignated 66th Bombardment Squadron, Medium on 20 December 1950
Activated on 2 January 1951
Discontinued on 15 June 1960
Redesignated 66th Strategic Missile Squadron on 19 March 1962
Organized on 1 July 1962
Redesignated 66th Missile Squadron on 1 September 1991
Inactivated on 1 September 1993

=== Assignments ===
- 44th Bombardment Group, 15 January 1941 – 12 July 1946
- 44th Bombardment Group, 1 July 1947 – 6 September 1948
- 44th Bombardment Group, 2 January 1951 (attached to 44th Bombardment Wing after 10 February 1951)
- 44th Bombardment Wing, 16 June 1952
- Department of the Air Force, 15 June 1960 (not organized)
- Strategic Air Command, 19 March 1962 (not organized)
- 44th Strategic Missile Wing, 1 July 1962
- 44th Operations Group, 1 September 1991 – 1 September 1993

=== Stations ===
- MacDill Field, Florida, 15 January 1941
- Barksdale Field, Louisiana, 9 February 1942
- Will Rogers Field, Oklahoma, 26 July-25 August 1942
- RAF Cheddington (Station 113), England, 12 September 1942
- RAF Shipdham (Station 115), England, 10 October 1942 – c. 15 June 1945
- Sioux Falls Army Air Field, South Dakota, 26 June 1945
- Great Bend Army Air Field, Kansas, 24 July 1945
- Smoky Hill Army Air Field, Kansas, c. 12 October 1945 – 12 July 1946
- Andrews Field (later Andrews Air Force Base), Maryland, 1 July 1947 – 6 September 1948
- March Air Force Base, California, 2 January 1951
- Lake Charles Air Force Base (later Chenault Air Force Base), Louisiana, 1 August 1951 – 15 June 1960
- Ellsworth Air Force Base, South Dakota, 1 September 1962 – 1 September 1993

=== Aircraft and missiles ===
- Consolidated B-24 Liberator, 1941–1945
- Boeing B-29 Superfortress, 1945–1946; 1951–1952
- Boeing TB-29 Superfortress, 1951
- Boeing B-47 Stratojet, 1953–1960
- LGM-30B Minuteman I, 1963–1973
- LGM-30F Minuteman II, 1972–1993

== See also ==
- Minuteman Missile National Historic Site - one of the squadron's launch control facilities and launch facilities left over from the Cold War.
- List of United States Air Force missile squadrons
