= 44th Missile Wing LGM-30 Minuteman Missile Launch Sites =

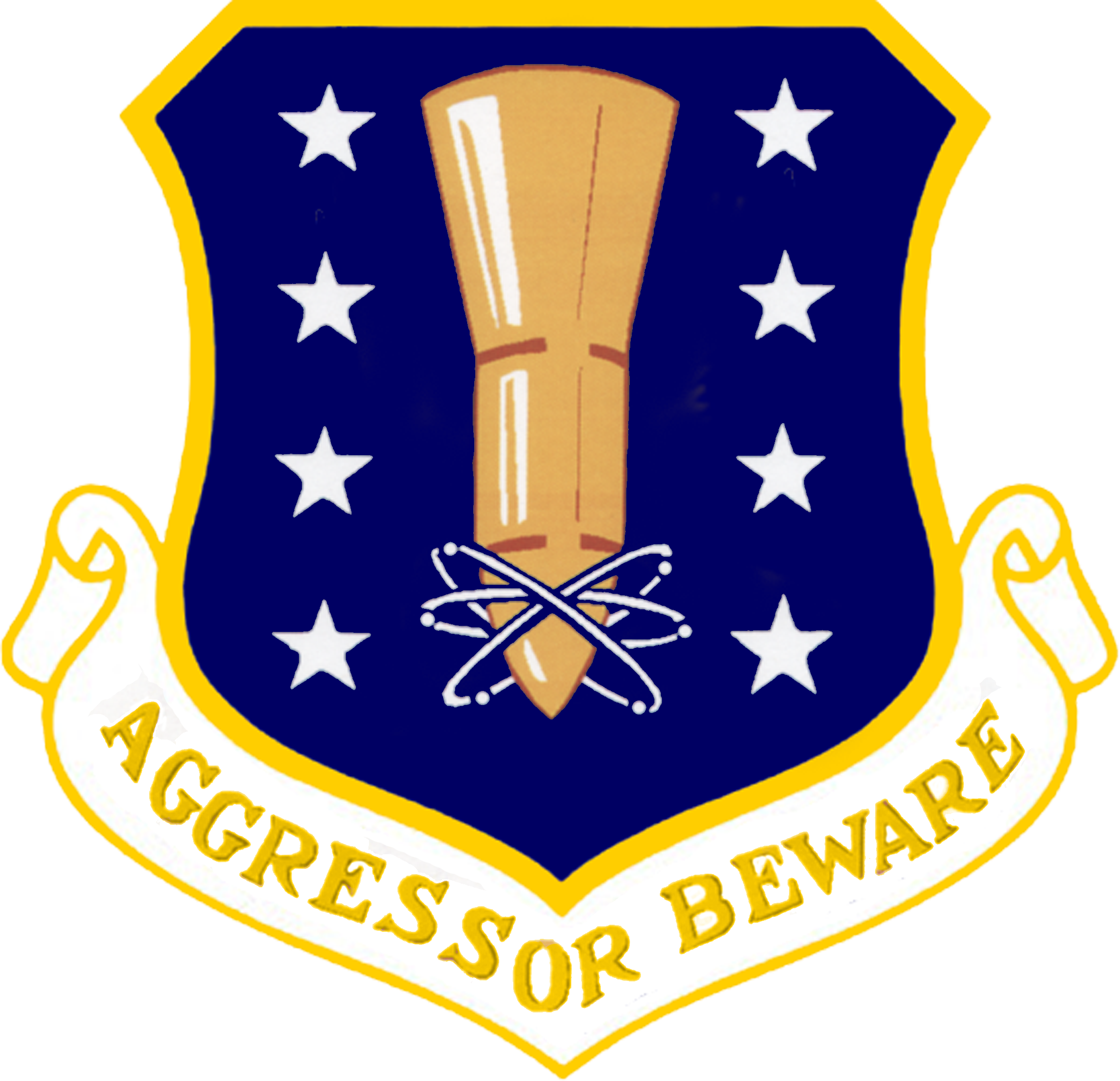
Emblem of the 44th Missile Wing

This is a list of the LGM-30 Minuteman missile, Missile Alert Facilities and Launch Facilities of the 44th Missile Wing, 20th Air Force, assigned to Ellsworth AFB, South Dakota.

The 44th SMW executed the unique 'Long Life' test of a Minuteman ICBM. The 68th Strategic Missile Squadron performed the only launch of a United States ICBM from an operational inland US missile site from LF November-02 (N-02) on 1 March 1965. The first stage was loaded with only enough propellant for seven seconds of burn time and the upper stages were inert. It successfully demonstrated the ability of a Strategic Air Command missile crew to launch an ICBM.

== Overview ==
The 44th Missile Wing was the second United States Air Force LGM-30 Minuteman ICBM wing. Deployment of the Minuteman ICBM began in 1961 with the initiation of construction of 150 silos and associated launch control facilities. Activation of the 44th Strategic Missile Wing on 1 January 1962, marked the initiation of SAC's first LGM-30B Minuteman I wing (the 341st SMW was equipped with the Minuteman 1A). The assignment of the 66th Strategic Missile Squadron on 1 September marked the beginning of SAC's first Minuteman IB squadron. During 1962 the 67th and 68th SMS stood up. In April 1963, the first missile was emplaced into a prepared silo. Two months later, SAC accepted the first flight of 10 Minuteman IB ICBMs and in July, some of these missiles were placed on alert status. The last of 150 missiles was placed on alert by the end of 1963.

Between October 1971 and March 1973 the Minuteman IBs were replaced by LGM-30F Minuteman II missiles. The end of the Cold War and President Bush's order of 28 September 1991 to remove Minuteman II missiles from alert status profoundly affected the 44th MW. To comply with the pending START I treaty, the Air Force immediately began removing missiles from their silos. The 67th MS inactivated in August 1992, with the 66th in 1993 and 68th lastly on 5 July 1994. Destruction of silos and alert facilities finished in 1996 when Kilo-06, was imploded on 13 September 1996.

Delta-01 and Delta-09 were left intact and are now the Minuteman Missile National Historic Site under the control of the National Park Service.

== Facilities ==
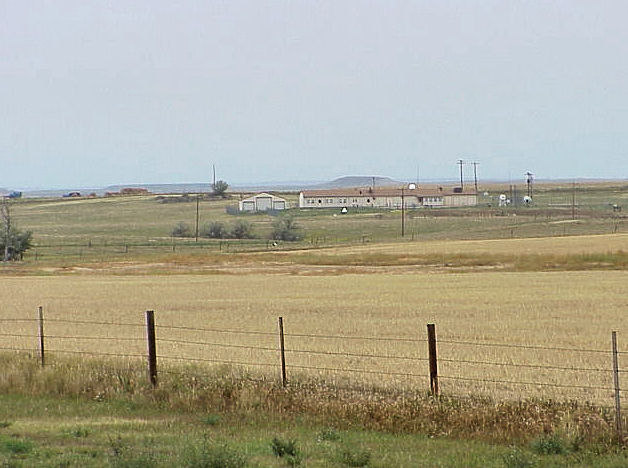
D-01 Missile Alert Facility

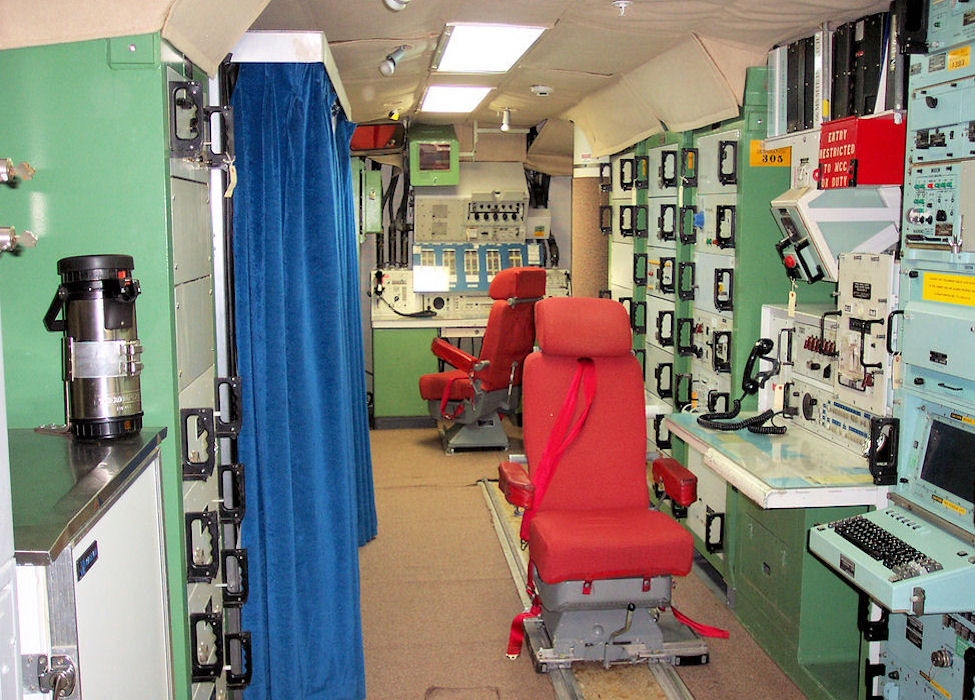
D-01 Launch Control Center

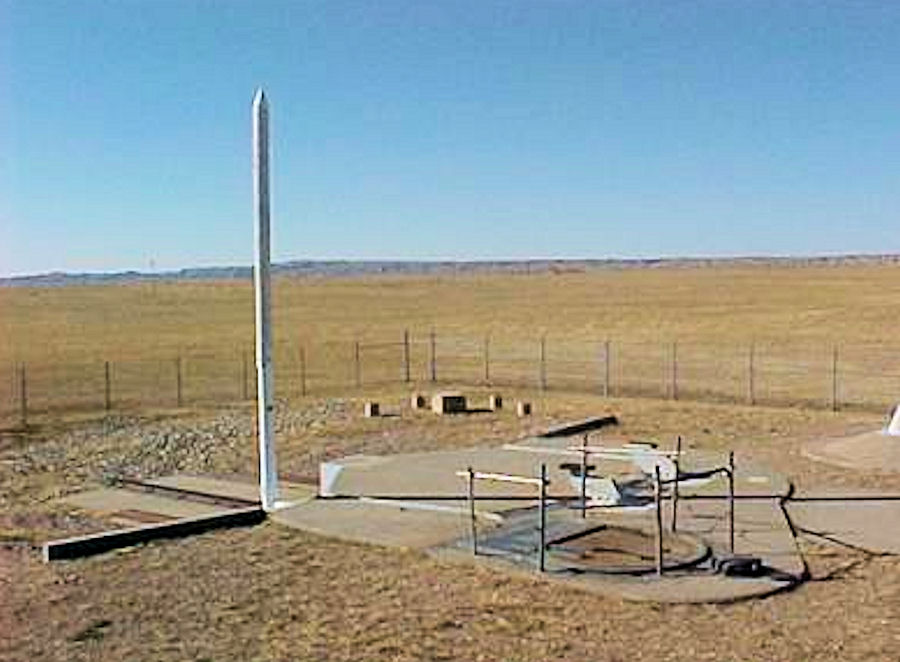
D-09 Minuteman III Launch Facility

The Missile Alert Facility (MAF) consists of a buried and hardened Launch Control Center (LCC) and an above-ground Launch Control Support Building (LCSB). MAFs were formerly known as Launch Control Facilities (LCFs) but terminology was changed in 1992 with the inactivation of Strategic Air Command (SAC). In addition, a MAF has a landing pad for helicopters; a large radio tower; a large "top hat" HF antenna; a vehicle garage for security vehicles; recreational facilities, and one or two sewage lagoons. The entire site, except for the helicopter pad and sewage lagoons are secured with a fence and security personnel. About a dozen airmen and officers are assigned to a MAF.

The underground LCC Launch Control Center (LCC) contains the command and control equipment for missile operations. It is staffed by the two launch officers who have primary control and responsibility for the 10 underground and hardened Launch Facilities (LF)s within its flight which contains the operational missile. Each of the five LCCs also has the ability to command and monitor all 50 LFs within the squadron. The LF is unmanned, except when maintenance and security personnel are needed.

A squadron is composed of five flights; flights are denoted by a letter of the alphabet with the facilities controlled by the flight being designated by a number, 01 through 11, with 01 being the MAF.

== Units and locations ==
=== 66th Missile Squadron ===
Activated by Strategic Air Command on 19 March 1962. Organized on 1 September 1962. Inactivated on 1 September 1993.

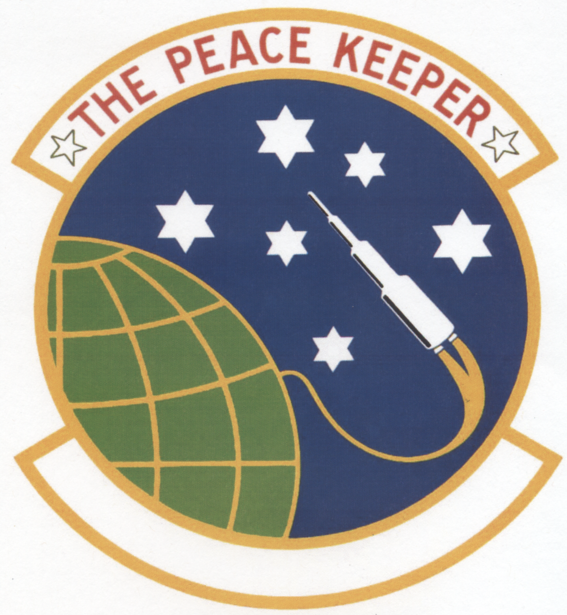
Emblem of the 66th Missile Squadron

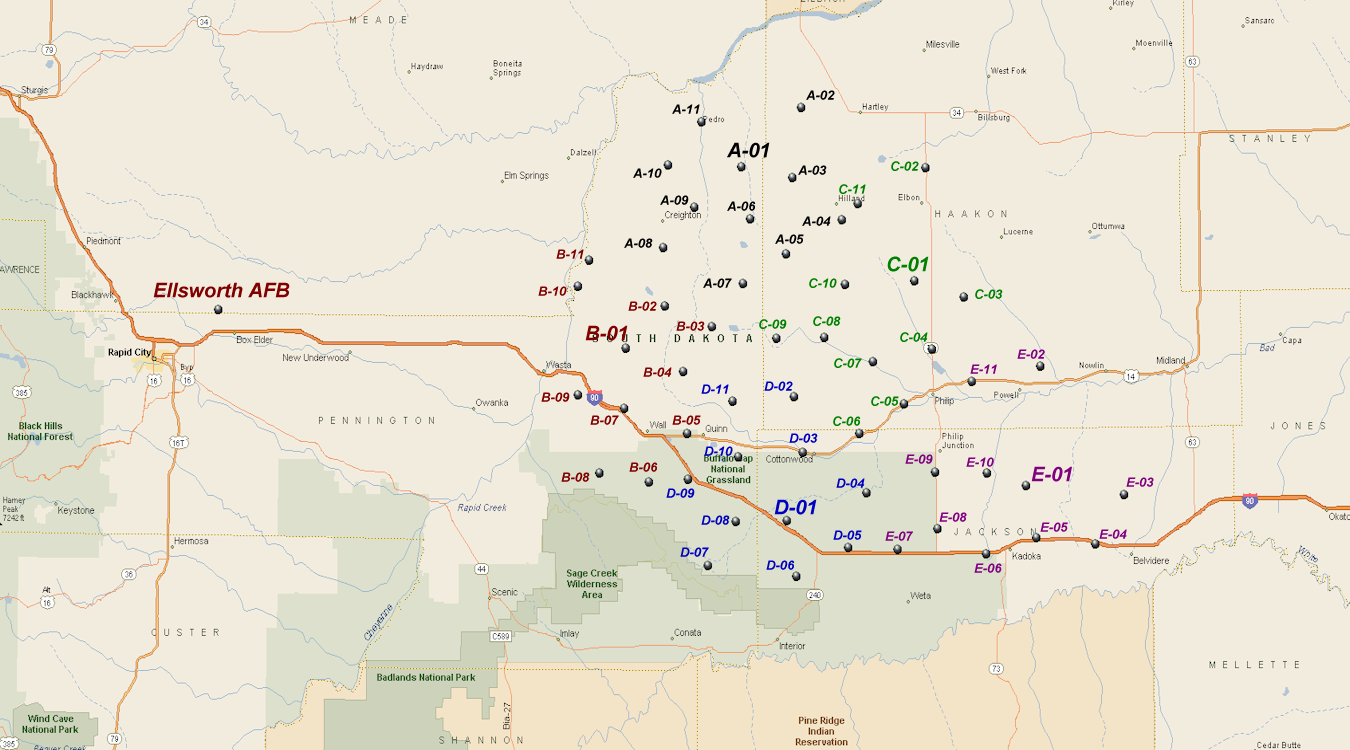
66th Missile Squadron – Missile Alert Facilities and Launch Facilities

- A-01 (MAF) 25.3 mi NxNE of Wall, SD; 52.4 mi ExNE of Ellsworth AFB
  44°19′52″N 102°03′05″W

A-02 32.6 mi NxNE of Wall SD, 44°24′27″N 101°55′50″W
A-03 26.6 mi NxNE of Wall SD, 44°19′02″N 101°56′56″W
A-04 26.9 mi NE of Wall SD, 44°15′48″N 101°50′56″W
A-05 20.9 mi NE of Wall SD, 44°13′12″N 101°57′39″W
A-06 21.3 mi NxNE of Wall SD, 44°15′50″N 102°02′01″W
A-07 16.1 mi NE of Wall SD, 44°10′54″N 102°02′53″W
A-08 16.2 mi N of Wall SD, 44°13′41″N 102°12′33″W
A-09 20.2 mi NxNE of Wall SD, 44°16′46″N 102°08′47″W
A-10 23.5 mi N of Wall SD, 44°20′02″N 102°11′57″W
A-11 27.8 mi N of Wall SD, 44°23′21″N 102°07′56″W

- B-01 (MAF) 8.3 mi ExNE of Wasta SD; 39.4 mi E of Ellsworth AFB
  44°05′56″N 102°17′01″W

B-02 13.3 mi ExNE of Wasta SD, 44°09′10″N 102°12′22″W
B-03 17.1 mi ExNE of Wasta SD, 44°07′34″N 102°06′41″W
B-04 13.8 mi E of Wasta SD, 44°04′10″N 102°10′08″W
B-05 15.3 mi ExSE of Wasta SD, 43°59′23″N 102°09′37″W
B-06 14.4 mi SE of Wasta SD, 43°55′37″N 102°14′13″W
B-07 8.6 mi ExSE of Wasta SD, 44°01′20″N 102°17′11″W
B-08 10.6 mi SxSE of Wasta SD, 43°56′20″N 102°20′13″W
B-09 3.9 mi ExSE of Wasta SD, 44°02′19″N 102°22′48″W
B-10 8.2 mi NxNE of Wasta SD, 44°10′43″N 102°22′47″W
B-11 10.8 mi NxNE of Wasta SD, 44°12′43″N 102°21′30″W

- C-01 (MAF) 10.1 mi N of Philip SD; 68.2 mi E of Ellsworth AFB
  44°11′01″N 101°42′09″W

C-02 20.0 mi N of Philip SD, 44°19′46″N 101°40′44″W
C-03 9.1 mi NxNE of Philip SD, 44°09′48″N 101°36′21″W
C-04 3.9 mi N of Philip SD, 44°05′48″N 101°40′08″W
C-05 3.0 mi WxSW of Philip SD, 44°01′35″N 101°43′29″W
C-06 8.1 mi WxSW of Philip SD, 43°59′21″N 101°48′56″W
C-07 6.9 mi WxNW of Philip SD, 44°04′50″N 101°47′43″W
C-08 11.9 mi WxNW of Philip SD, 44°06′42″N 101°53′08″W
C-09 16.3 mi WxNW of Philip SD, 44°06′41″N 101°58′49″W
C-10 13.0 mi NW of Philip SD, 44°10′49″N 101°50′35″W
C-11 17.3 mi NxNW of Philip SD, 44°16′59″N 101°44′58″W

- D-01** (MAF) 6.7 mi SxSW of Cottonwood SD; 58.4 mi ExSE of Ellsworth AFB
  43°52′40″N 101°57′42″W

D-02 5.2 mi NxNW of Cottonwood SD, 44°02′11″N 101°56′44″W
D-03 1.1 mi W of Cottonwood SD, 43°57′54″N 101°55′41″W
D-04 6.4 mi SE of Cottonwood SD, 43°54′47″N 101°48′05″W
D-05 9.2 mi SxSE of Cottonwood SD, 43°50′35″N 101°50′20″W
D-06 11.2 mi S of Cottonwood SD, 43°48′22″N 101°56′33″W
D-07 14.7 mi SW of Cottonwood SD, 43°49′12″N 102°07′08″W
D-08 10.0 mi SW of Cottonwood SD, 43°52′34″N 102°03′49″W
D-09** 12.8 mi W of Cottonwood SD, 43°55′52″N 102°09′35″W
D-10 7.5 mi W of Cottonwood SD, 43°57′36″N 102°03′28″W
D-11 9.2 mi WxNW of Cottonwood SD, 44°01′53″N 102°04′07″W

- E-01 (MAF) 6.3 mi NxNE of Kadoka SD; 80.8 mi E of Ellsworth AFB
  43°55′12″N 101°28′52″W

E-02 15.8 mi N of Kadoka SD, 44°03′24″N 101°27′03″W
E-03 12.5 mi ExNE of Kadoka SD, 43°54′26″N 101°17′05″W
E-04 8.4 mi E of Kadoka SD, 43°50′40″N 101°20′39″W
E-05 2.9 mi ExNE of Kadoka SD, 43°51′12″N 101°27′40″W
E-06 2.6 mi W of Kadoka SD, 43°49′59″N 101°33′47″W
E-07 11.4 mi W of Kadoka SD, 43°50′25″N 101°44′23″W
E-08 7.7 mi WxNW of Kadoka SD, 43°51′57″N 101°39′33″W
E-09 10.6 mi NW of Kadoka SD, 43°56′19″N 101°39′46″W
E-10 9.9 mi NxNW of Kadoka SD, 43°58′12″N 101°33′37″W
E-11 15.9 mi NxNW of Kadoka SD, 44°03′19″N 101°35′18″W

.** Now part of the Minuteman Missile National Historic Site.

=== 67th Missile Squadron ===
Activated by Strategic Air Command on 19 March 1962. Organized on 1 September 1962. Inactivated on 15 August 1992.

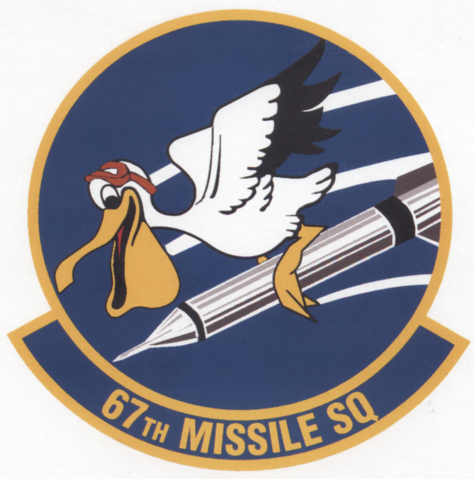
Emblem of the 67th Missile Squadron

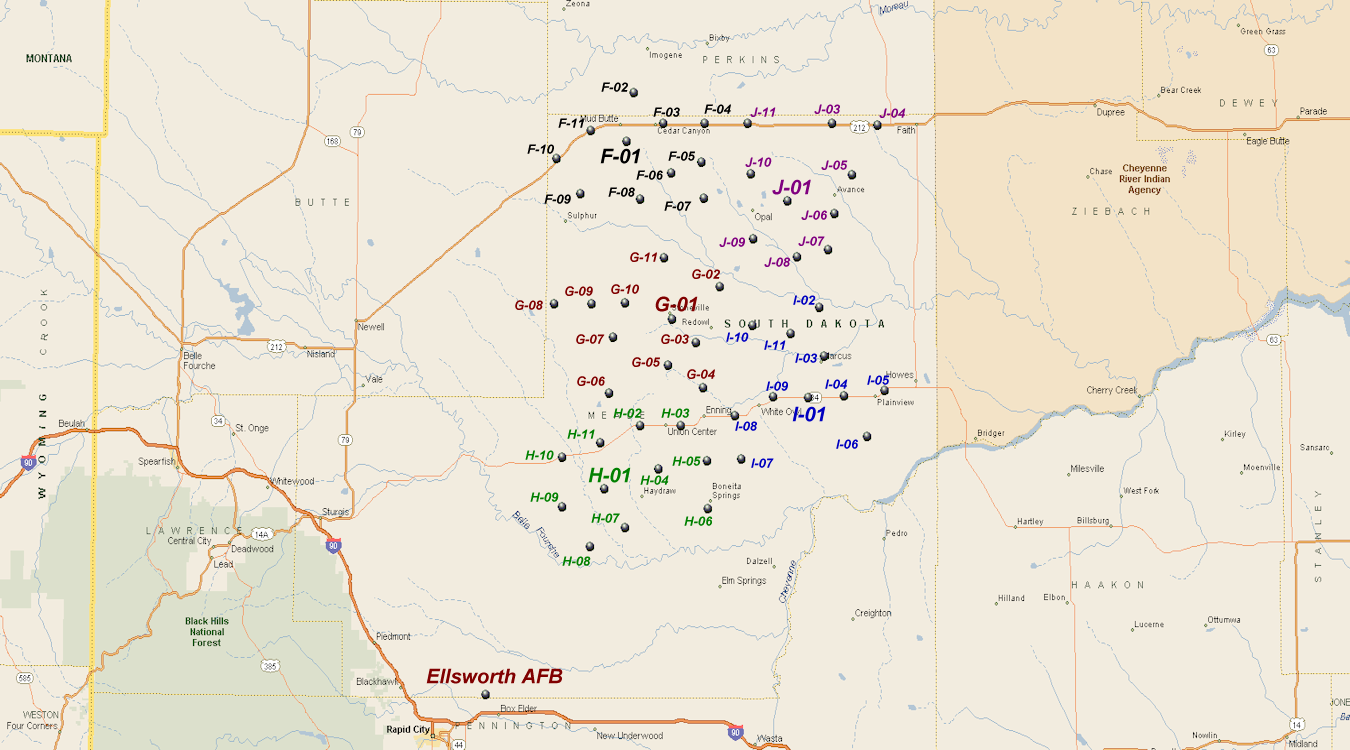
67th Missile Squadron – Missile Alert Facilities and Launch Facilities

- F-01 (MAF) 35.5 mi W of Faith, SD; 61.0 mi NxNE of Ellsworth AFB
  44°59′49″N 102°45′43″W

F-02 34.6 mi W of Faith SD, 45°04′20″N 102°44′40″W
F-03 30.9 mi W of Faith SD, 45°01′34″N 102°40′16″W
F-04 26.0 mi W of Faith SD, 45°01′30″N 102°34′14″W
F-05 26.6 mi W of Faith SD, 44°57′58″N 102°34′37″W
F-06 30.5 mi W of Faith SD, 44°56′54″N 102°39′11″W
F-07 27.2 mi WxSW of Faith SD, 44°54′38″N 102°34′18″W
F-08 34.7 mi WxSW of Faith SD, 44°54′32″N 102°43′46″W
F-09 41.6 mi W of Faith SD, 44°55′01″N 102°52′32″W
F-10 43.9 mi W of Faith SD, 44°58′14″N 102°56′05″W
F-11 41.6 mi W of Faith SD, 45°00′50″N 102°51′01″W

- G-01 (MAF) 11.1 mi NxNW of Enning SD; 45.3 mi NxNE of Ellsworth AFB
  44°43′25″N 102°39′00″W

G-02 13.8 mi N of Enning SD, 44°46′25″N 102°32′01″W
G-03 7.8 mi N of Enning SD, 44°41′17″N 102°33′52″W
G-04 3.0 mi N of Enning SD, 44°37′05″N 102°34′26″W
G-05 7.2 mi NW of Enning SD, 44°39′10″N 102°39′38″W
G-06 12.2 mi WxNW of Enning SD, 44°36′35″N 102°48′18″W
G-07 14.1 mi NW of Enning SD, 44°41′44″N 102°47′42″W
G-08 22.0 mi WxNW of Enning SD, 44°44′51″N 102°56′22″W
G-09 18.4 mi NW of Enning SD, 44°44′51″N 102°50′52″W
G-10 15.6 mi NW of Enning SD, 44°44′58″N 102°45′54″W
G-11 17.6 mi NxNW of Enning SD, 44°49′04″N 102°40′12″W

- H-01 (MAF) 10.0 mi SW of Union Center SD; 25.5 mi NxNE of Ellsworth AFB
  44°27′43″N 102°48′55″W

H-02 3.0 mi W of Union Center SD, 44°33′35″N 102°43′31″W
H-03 1.8 mi E of Union Center SD, 44°33′35″N 102°37′44″W
H-04 4.7 mi SxSW of Union Center SD, 44°29′34″N 102°41′02″W
H-05 6.2 mi SE of Union Center SD, 44°30′20″N 102°33′50″W
H-06 10.2 mi SxSE of Union Center SD, 44°25′55″N 102°33′49″W
H-07 11.9 mi SxSW of Union Center SD, 44°24′09″N 102°45′53″W
H-08 15.8 mi SW of Union Center SD, 44°22′26″N 102°51′05″W
H-09 15.3 mi SW of Union Center SD, 44°26′06″N 102°55′12″W
H-10 13.0 mi WxSW of Union Center SD, 44°30′40″N 102°55′10″W
H-11 8.1 mi WxSW of Union Center SD, 44°32′01″N 102°49′31″W

- I-01 (MAF) 13.1 mi W of Howes, SD; 49.2 mi NE of Ellsworth AFB
  44°36′10″N 102°18′57″W

I-02 14.4 mi NW of Howes, SD, 44°44′31″N 102°17′15″W
I-03 11.6 mi WxNW of Howes, SD, 44°40′00″N 102°16′39″W
I-04 8.8 mi W of Howes, SD, 44°36′19″N 102°13′41″W
I-05 3.8 mi W of Howes, SD, 44°36′45″N 102°07′41″W
I-06 8.0 mi SW of Howes, SD, 44°32′32″N 102°10′20″W
I-07 22.5 mi WxSW of Howes, SD, 44°30′30″N 102°28′48″W
I-08 22.1 mi W of Howes, SD, 44°34′28″N 102°29′44″W
I-09 17.3 mi W of Howes, SD, 44°36′12″N 102°24′06″W
I-10 20.8 mi WxNW W of Howes, SD, 44°42′50″N 102°27′09″W
I-11 16.1 mi WxNW W of Howes, SD, 44°42′05″N 102°21′29″W

- J-01 (MAF) 13.8 mi SE of Maurine SD; 63.3 mi NxNE of Ellsworth AFB
  44°54′20″N 102°21′55″W

J-02 11.3 mi E of Maurine SD, 45°01′16″N 102°21′41″W
J-03 16.6 mi E of Maurine SD, 45°01′28″N 102°15′17″W
J-04 22.0 mi E of Maurine SD, 45°01′18″N 102°08′36″W
J-05 19.6 mi ExSE of Maurine SD, 44°56′45″N 102°12′24″W
J-06 19.3 mi ExSE of Maurine SD, 44°53′11″N 102°14′58″W
J-07 20.8 mi SE of Maurine SD, 44°49′51″N 102°16′01″W
J-08 18.7 mi S of Maurine SD, 44°49′07″N 102°20′36″W
J-09 14.1 mi SxSE of Maurine SD, 44°50′49″N 102°27′00″W
J-10 8.5 mi SE of Maurine SD, 44°56′50″N 102°27′21″W
J-11 6.3 mi E of Maurine SD, 45°01′32″N 102°27′48″W

=== 68th Missile Squadron ===
Activated by Strategic Air Command on 19 March 1962. Organized on 1 September 1962. Inactivated on 5 July 1994.

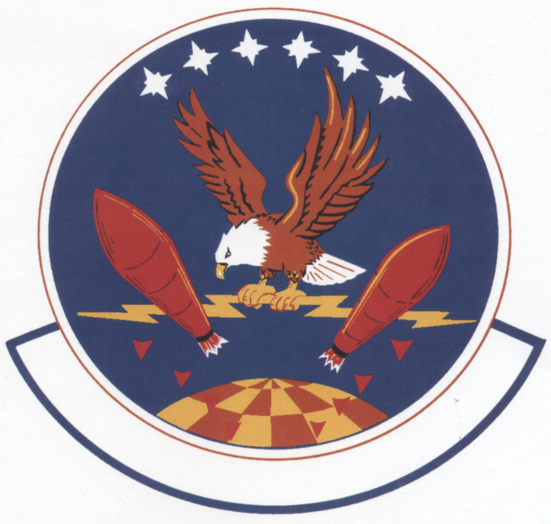
Emblem of the 68th Missile Squadron

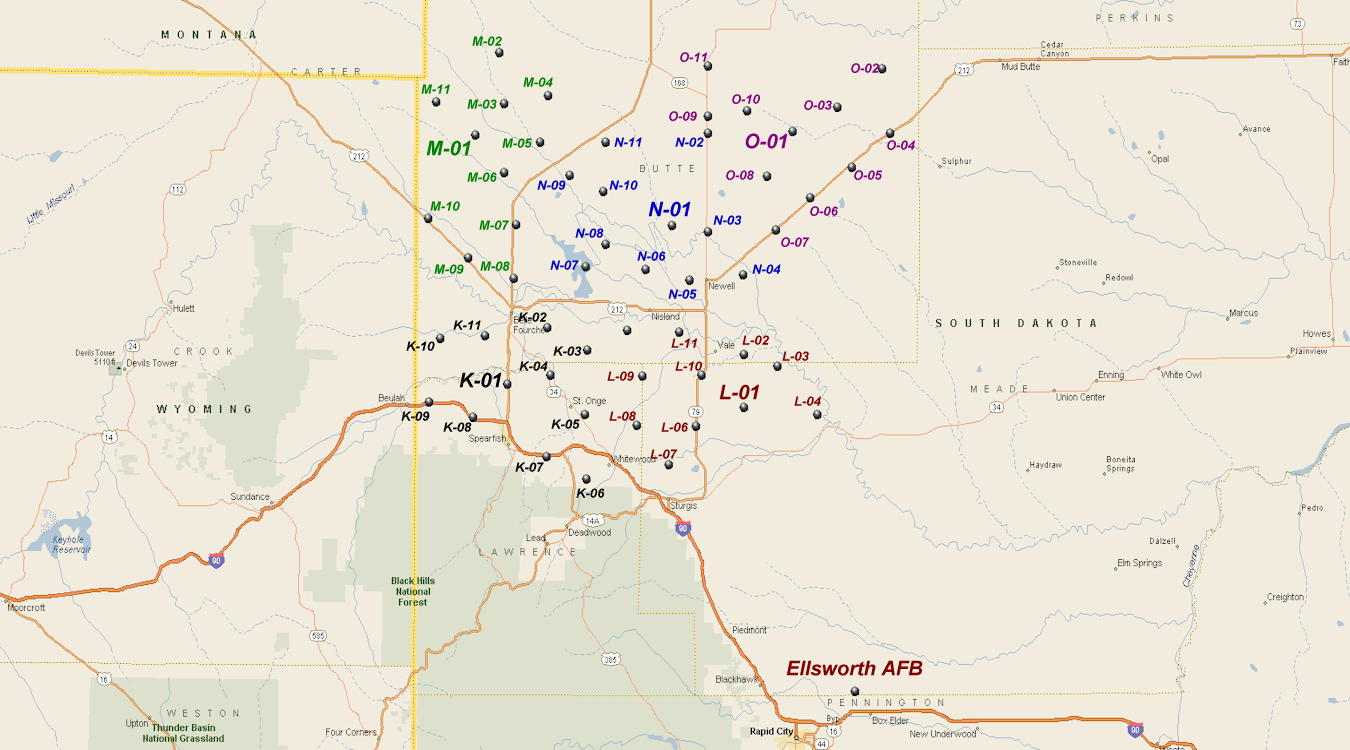
68th Missile Squadron – Missile Alert Facilities and Launch Facilities

- K-01 (MAF) 5.6 mi N of Spearfish SD; 48.9 mi NW of Ellsworth AFB
  44°34′22″N 103°51′42″W

K-02 11.9 mi NxNE of Spearfish SD, 44°39′09″N 103°46′32″W
K-03 12.4 mi NE of Spearfish SD, 44°37′14″N 103°41′13″W
K-04 8.0 mi NE of Spearfish SD, 44°35′11″N 103°46′03″W
K-05 8.8 mi ExNE of Spearfish SD, 44°31′52″N 103°41′31″W
K-06 9.2 mi ExSE of Spearfish SD, 44°26′29″N 103°41′17″W
K-07 4.4 mi ExSE of Spearfish SD, 44°28′22″N 103°46′34″W
K-08 4.4 mi WxNW of Spearfish SD, 44°31′34″N 103°56′14″W
K-09 9.4 mi WxNW of Spearfish SD, 44°32′53″N 104°02′04″W
K-10 12.4 mi NW of Spearfish SD, 44°38′11″N 104°00′39″W
K-11 10.6 mi NxNW of Spearfish SD, 44°38′25″N 103°54′45″W

- L-01 (MAF) 6.2 mi SxSE of Vale SD; 30.6 mi NxNW of Ellsworth AFB
  44°32′29″N 103°20′42″W

L-02 2.9 mi E of Vale SD, 44°36′53″N 103°20′41″W
L-03 6.7 mi ExSE of Vale SD, 44°35′55″N 103°16′13″W
L-04 12.4 mi ExSE of Vale SD, 44°31′49″N 103°11′04″W
L-05 12.1 mi SxSW of Vale SD, 44°27′43″N 103°30′35″W
L-06 7.6 mi SxSW of Vale SD, 44°30′53″N 103°26′58″W
L-07 11.2 mi SW of Vale SD, 44°31′00″N 103°34′41″W
L-08 8.4 mi WxSW of Vale SD, 44°35′04″N 103°33′59″W
L-09 9.6 mi WxNW of Vale SD, 44°38′56″N 103°35′39″W
L-10 2.9 mi SW of Vale SD, 44°35′09″N 103°26′11″W
L-11 4.5 mi WxNW of Vale SD, 44°38′46″N 103°29′09″W

- M-01 (MAF) 17.7 mi NxNW of Belle Fourche SD; 68.4 mi NW of Ellsworth AFB
  44°55′09″N 103°56′07″W

M-02 25.1 mi N of Belle Fourche SD, 45°02′03″N 103°53′00″W
M-03 20.2 mi N of Belle Fourche SD, 44°57′46″N 103°52′21″W
M-04 21.3 mi N of Belle Fourche SD, 44°58′31″N 103°46′28″W
M-05 16.7 mi N of Belle Fourche SD, 44°54′37″N 103°47′34″W
M-06 13.6 mi N of Belle Fourche SD, 44°52′01″N 103°52′18″W
M-07 8.6 mi N of Belle Fourche SD, 44°47′43″N 103°50′39″W
M-08 3.4 mi N of Belle Fourche SD, 44°43′14″N 103°51′00″W
M-09 7.3 mi NW of Belle Fourche SD, 44°44′54″N 103°57′01″W
M-10 12.9 mi NW of Belle Fourche SD, 44°48′09″N 104°02′15″W
M-11 22.0 mi NxNW of Belle Fourche SD, 44°57′53″N 104°01′19″W

- N-01 (MAF) 6.7 mi NW of Newell SD; 49.7 mi NxNW of Ellsworth AFB
  44°47′41″N 103°30′09″W

N-02** 9.6 mi N of Newell SD, 44°51′21″N 103°25′23″W
N-03 4.8 mi N of Newell SD, 44°47′10″N 103°25′24″W
N-04 3.8 mi E of Newell SD, 44°43′31″N 103°20′44″W
N-05 2.1 mi W of Newell SD, 44°43′08″N 103°27′48″W
N-06 7.0 mi W of Newell SD, 44°44′00″N 103°33′39″W
N-07 13.5 mi W of Newell SD, 44°41′12″N 103°41′32″W
N-08 11.7 mi WxNW of Newell SD, 44°46′05″N 103°38′51″W
N-09 18.1 mi NW of Newell SD, 44°51′52″N 103°43′36″W
N-10 14.3 mi NW of Newell SD, 44°50′29″N 103°39′10″W
N-11 17.4 mi NW of Newell SD, 44°54′37″N 103°38′54″W

- O-01 (MAF) 38.5 mi W of Opal, SD; 54.6 mi N of Ellsworth AFB
  44°55′29″N 103°14′13″W

O-02 30.0 mi WxNW of Opal, SD, 45°00′44″N 103°02′20″W
O-03 34.0 mi W of Opal, SD, 44°57′31″N 103°08′14″W
O-04 28.0 mi W of Opal, SD, 44°55′17″N 103°01′15″W
O-05 32.2 mi W of Opal, SD, 44°52′30″N 103°06′25″W
O-06 36.9 mi W of Opal, SD, 44°49′58″N 103°11′50″W
O-07 41.0 mi W of Opal, SD, 44°47′16″N 103°16′27″W
O-08 41.4 mi W of Opal, SD, 44°51′47″N 103°17′36″W
O-09 47.7 mi W of Opal, SD, 44°56′46″N 103°25′20″W
O-10 43.6 mi W of Opal, SD, 44°57′15″N 103°20′10″W
O-11 48.4 mi W of Opal, SD, 45°00′58″N 103°25′21″W

.** Only operational silo ever to launch an ICBM, 1 March 1965. Was refurbished after the launch and returned to service. Imploded in 1996 and now being used for storage of hay bales.
