= RAF Shipdham =

Former RAF station in Norfolk, England

RAF Shipdham USAAF Station 115
- Located Near Dereham, Norfolk, England
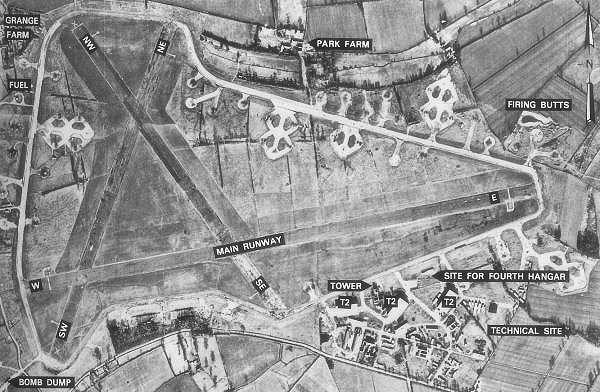
- Shipdham Airfield - 31 January 1946

Site information
- Type: Royal Air Force station
- Code: SJ
- Owner: Air Ministry
- Operator: Royal Air Force; United States Army Air Forces
- Controlled by: Twelfth Air Force; Eighth Air Force

Location
- Location in Norfolk
- Coordinates: 52.62°N 0.92°E

Site history
- Built: 1942
- In use: 1942-1957
- Battles/wars: European Theatre of World War II; Air Offensive, Europe July 1942 - May 1945

Garrison information
- Garrison: 319th Bombardment Group (Medium); 44th Bombardment Group (Heavy)

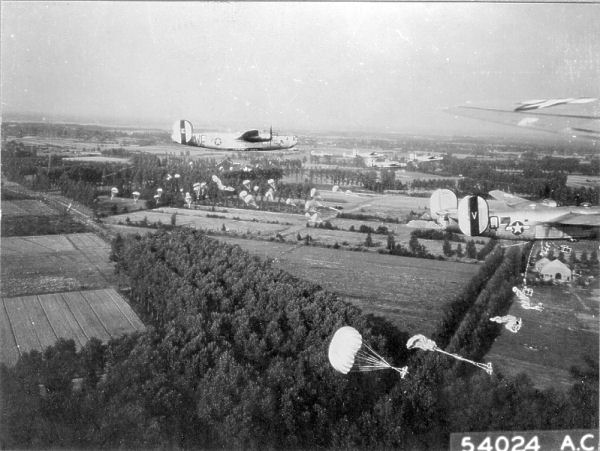
Consolidated B-24 Liberators of the 44th Bomb Group on a parachute drop.

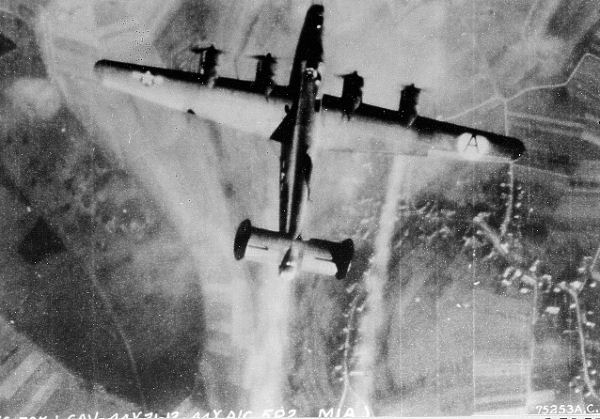
B-24 of the 44th Bomb Group hit by enemy fire on a mission over enemy territory.

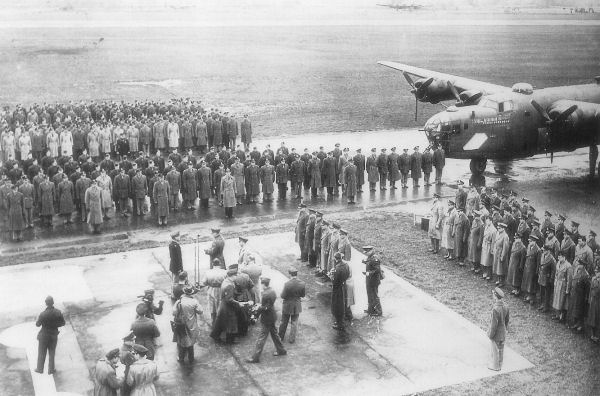
Medal of Honor Ceremony for Col Leon Johnson at Shipdham Airfield, 1943.

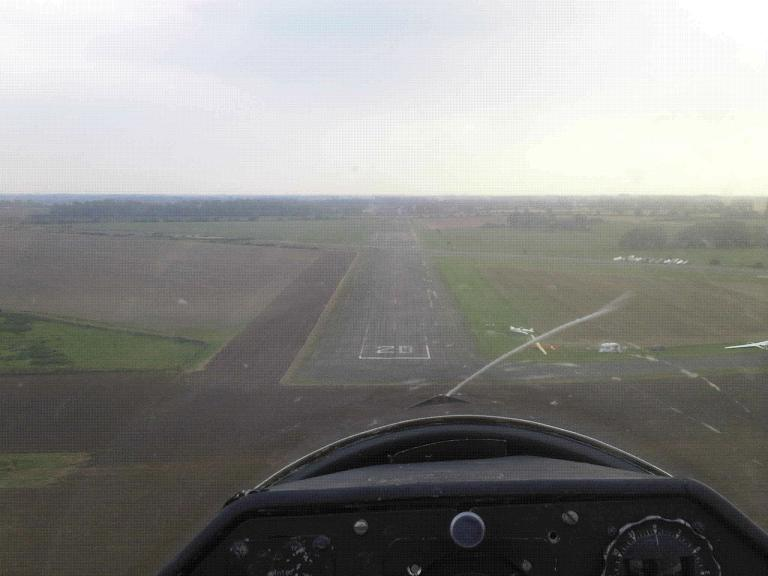
Final approach on NE-SW runway, September 2008.

Royal Air Force Shipdham or more simply RAF Shipdham is a former Royal Air Force station located 3 miles (5 km) south of Dereham, Norfolk, England.

The airfield now operates as Shipdham Airfield.

== History ==
=== USAAF use ===
RAF Shipdham was the first US heavy bomber base in Norfolk and was also the continuous host to Consolidated B-24 Liberators longer than any other Eighth Air Force combat airfield in Britain - from October 1942 to late 1945. It was constructed 1941-42 and was assigned USAAF designation Station 115 (SJ).

From 13 September 1943 though 13 June 1945, Shipdham served as headquarters for the 14th Combat Bombardment Wing, 2d Air Division, VIII Bomber Command (later Eighth Air Force).

==== 319th Bombardment Group (Medium) ====
The 319th Bombardment Group (Medium) was a Twelfth Air Force Martin B-26 Marauder medium bomber group which arrived at Shipdham on 12 September 1942 from Harding Army Air Field, Louisiana.

The personnel of the group used the base as a staging and assembly point before moving in early October for RAF Horsham St Faith in Norfolk. From there the unit moved to Algeria in the Mediterranean Theater of Operations (MTO) in November as part of the Operation Torch invasion forces.

==== 44th Bombardment Group (Heavy) ====
With the departure of the 319th BG, Shipdham was assigned to the 44th Bombardment Group (Heavy), arriving from Will Rogers Field, Oklahoma on 10 October 1942.

The 44th was assigned to the 14th Combat Bombardment Wing, and the group tail code was a "Circle-A". Its operational squadrons were:

- 66th Bombardment Squadron (WQ)
- 67th Bombardment Squadron (NB)
- 68th Bombardment Squadron (QK)
- 506th Bombardment Squadron (GJ)

The group flew Consolidated B-24 Liberators as part of the Eighth Air Force's strategic bombing campaign. The 44th was the first USAAF group to be equipped with the Liberator and the unit had helped form other groups destined to fly the type. The Group was initially under strength, one of its four squadrons having been detached in the US. In March 1943 the 506th Squadron was assigned to the group.

The 44th Bomb Group's operations consisted primarily of assaults against strategic targets in France, Belgium, the Netherlands, Germany, Italy, Romania, Austria, Poland, and Sicily. Among the targets attacked were submarine installations, industrial establishments, airfields, harbors, shipyards, and other objectives, November 1942 - June 1943.

The unit received a Distinguished Unit Citation (DUC) for an extremely hazardous mission against naval installations at Kiel on 14 May 1943: Its B-24's flew in the wake of the main formation and carried incendiaries to be dropped after three Boeing B-17 Flying Fortress groups had released high explosive bombs, thus the group's aircraft were particularly vulnerable lacking the protection of the firepower of the main force. This vulnerability increased when the group opened its own formation for the attack; but the 44th blanketed the target with incendiaries in spite of the concentrated flak and continuous interceptor attacks it encountered.

Late in June 1943 a large detachment moved to Libya to help facilitate the Allied invasion of Sicily by bombing airfields and marshalling yards in Italy. The detachment also participated in the famous low-level raid on the Ploesti oil fields on 1 August 1943. The group was awarded a DUC for its part in this raid and its commander, Colonel Leon W. Johnson, was awarded the Medal of Honor for his daring and initiative in leading his men into smoke, flame, and alerted fighter and antiaircraft opposition over the target, which already had been bombed in error by another group.

Before returning to England at the end of August, the detachment bombed an aircraft factory in Austria and supported ground forces in Sicily. In September 1943 the group struck airfields in the Netherlands and France and convoys in the North Sea. Also in September, a detachment was sent to North Africa to support the Salerno operations.

This proved to be the 44th's last detachment and in October when several new B-24 groups were arriving in Norfolk, the 44th was fully committed to the combined bomber offensive from the UK. From November 1943 to April 1945, the group carried out operations against targets in western Europe, concentrating on airfields, oil installations, and marshalling yards.

The group took part in the intensive campaign of heavy bombers against the German aircraft industry during Big Week, 20–25 February 1944. The group flew support and interdictory missions; struck airfields, railroads, and V-weapon sites in preparation for the Normandy invasion; supported the invasion in June 1944 by attacking strong points in the beachhead area and transportation targets behind the front lines. The group aided the Caen offensive and the Saint-Lô breakthrough in July; and dropped food, ammunition, and other supplies to troops engaged in the airborne attack on the Netherlands in September. The group also helped to check the enemy offensive during the Battle of the Bulge, December 1944–January 1945, by striking bridges, tunnels, choke points, rail and road junctions, and communications in the battle area. The group attacked airfields and transportation in support of the advance into Germany, and flew a resupply mission during the airborne assault across the Rhine in March 1945.

The 44th Bomb Group flew its last combat mission on 25 April 1945. During the course of hostilities, the 44th flew a total of 343 missions and its gunners were credited with 330 enemy fighters shot down; its own losses, the highest of any B-24 group in the Eighth, were 153. The unit returned to Sioux Falls Army Airfield, South Dakota in June 1945.

Legacy

Reassigned to Great Bend Army Airfield, Kansas 25 July 1945. In preparation for Operation Downfall, the overall Allied plan for the invasion of Japan, the group was redesignated the 44th Bombardment Group (Very Heavy) in August 1945 in preparation for receiving Boeing B-29 Superfortresses. Assigned to Strategic Air Command on 21 March 1946. Reassigned to Smoky Hill Army Airfield, Kansas, 14 December 1945. Inactivated 12 July 1946.

=== Air Ministry use ===
Between 1946 and 1947, the airfield was used as a transit centre for German POWs en route from the United States for repatriation to Germany.

The base was also home to No. 258 Maintenance Unit RAF

Part of Shipdham was sold in 1957 and the remainder between 1962 and 1963.

== Current use ==
With the end of military control Arrow Air Services acquired the airfield from a local farmer and applied for planning permission to re-open the airfield. This was granted in September 1969, and the following April. work began on refurbishing the facility. Two of the concrete runways were refurbished, together with the approach road and perimeter track. The runway lights were found to be still serviceable, although they had to be brought up to modern standards.

Shipdham was opened to private flying on 16 June 1970 and currently is the home of the Shipdham Aero Club. Its clubhouse is home to their museum and the airfield is unlicensed. Most of the airfield buildings remain in various states of decay, and part of the site is in use as an industrial estate.

In 2012, Powererd Paraglider training operation - Ufly4fun Pilots Club moved to the airfield from Northrepps Aerodrome.

It was reported in July 2023 that the airfield would close for good in November 2023 and would be redeveloped as a solar farm.

== See also ==
- List of former Royal Air Force stations
- List of Norfolk airfields
