= 28th Expeditionary Air Refueling Squadron =

US Air Force unit

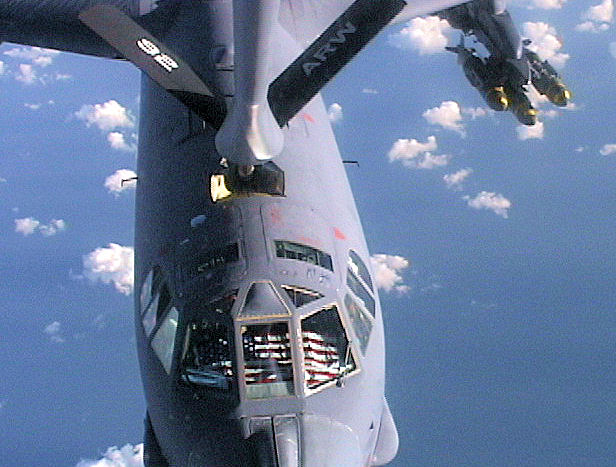
- A squadron Boeing KC-135 Stratotanker refuels a B-52 Stratofortress of the 40th Air Expeditionary Wing
- Active: 1942–1944; 1944–1946; 1960–1994; 2002-Undetermined
- Country: United States
- Branch: United States Air Force
- Role: Aerial refueling
- Part of: 379th Expeditionary Operations Group
- Garrison/HQ: Al Udeid Air Base

Insignia
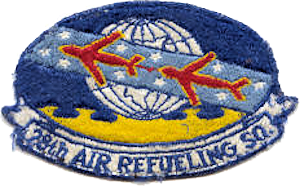
- Patch with 28th Air Refeueling Squadron emblem

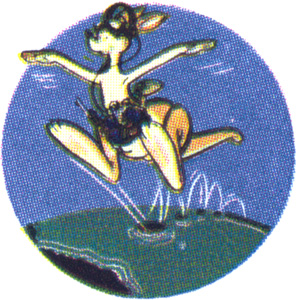
- 28th Ferrying Squadron emblem

The 28th Expeditionary Air Refueling Squadron is a provisional United States Air Force unit. It was last known to be assigned to the 40th Air Expeditionary Group. Diego Garcia Air Base, British Indian Ocean Territory. Its current status is at Al Udeid Air Base under the 379th Expeditionary Operations Group.

== History ==
=== World War II ===
The first predecessor of the squadron, the 28th Ferrying Squadron was activated at Hamilton Field, California in 1942. It soon moved to Long Beach Army Air Field, California, near the production facilities of Douglas Aircraft. It ferried aircraft within the United States until a major reorganization of the Army Air Forces (AAF) in 1944 replaced the squadron and other Air Transport Command units at Long Beach with an AAF Base Unit.

Shortly after this, the second predecessor of the squadron, the 328th Ferrying Squadron was activated in Italy to ferry aircraft in the Mediterranean Theater of Operations. It continued operations until shortly after the end of World War II, when it was inactivated. It was disbanded in October 1948.

=== Cold War ===
During the Cold War, the 28th Air Refueling Squadron was assigned to the 28th Bombardment Wing at Ellsworth Air Force Base, South Dakota. It was inactivated on 15 March 1994. The squadron was formed from the personnel and equipment of the 928th Air Refueling Squadron, which was simultaneously inactivated, on 1 October 1960. The 28th refuelled 28th Bombardment Wing Boeing B-52 Stratofortress bombers with Boeing KC-135 Stratotankers between 1960 and the retirement of the wing's "Buffs" in 1990.

In 1962, SAC organized four Post-Attack Command and Control System (PACCS) squadrons and equipped them with Boeing EB-47 Stratojets. The establishment of Boeing EC-135 airborne command post aircraft at SAC headquarters and at each of its Numbered Air Forces resulted in the inactivation of the less capable B-47 units by 1965. The communications relay mission of the B-47 units was assumed by the 28th and 906th Air Refueling Squadrons, which received a variety of EC-135s for this mission. By the mid-1960s, improved accuracy of Soviet ballistic missiles made underground Minuteman missile launch control centers more vulnerable, so the Airborne Launch Control System (ALCS) was created to provide a survivable launch capability. The ALCS was eventually installed aboard all PACCS aircraft assigned to the 28th. Launch crews came from the 68th Strategic Missile Squadron. In April 1970, the squadron's ALCS aircraft were transferred to the new 4th Airborne Command and Control Squadron at Ellsworth.

In 1985 the 28th Air Refueling Squadron was consolidated with the 28th Ferrying Squadron and the 328th Ferrying Squadron. The 28th continued its air refueling mission as part of the 28th Operations Group at Ellsworth until Strategic Air Command was inactivated in June 1992. The squadron was reassigned to the 43d Operations Group of Air Mobility Command at Malmstrom Air Force Base, Montana until 1994.

=== Twenty-first century ===
The squadron was reactivated as a provisional KC-135 organization approximately 2002, ahead of the 2003 invasion of Iraq. The squadron has taken part in Operation Enduring Freedom and Operation Iraqi Freedom. It may have inactivated in 2006.

The squadron was reactivated under the command of LtCol. Menola Guthrie and joined the 379th Expeditionary Operations Group at Al Udeid Air Base.

== Lineage ==
28th Ferrying Squadron

- Constituted as the 28th Ferrying Squadron c. 9 July 1942

Activated on 10 July 1942
Disbanded 31 March 1944

- Reconstituted on 19 September 1985 and consolidated with the 328th Ferrying Squadron and 928th Air Refueling Squadron as the 928th Air Refueling Squadron

328th Ferrying Squadron

- Constituted as the 328th Ferrying Squadron

Activated c. 1 June 1944
Inactivated c. June 1946
Disbanded 8 October 1948

- Reconstituted on 19 September 1985 and consolidated with the 28th Ferrying Squadron and 928th Air Refueling Squadron as the 928th Air Refueling Squadron

28th Expeditionary Air Refueling Squadron

- Constituted as the 28th Air Refueling Squadron, Heavy on 19 April 1960 and activated (not organized) (Note: A 28th Air Refueling Squadron, Heavy was constituted on 22 August 1958 for assignment to the 28th Bombardment Wing, but this action was revoked)

Organized on 1 October 1960

- Consolidated on 19 September 1985 with the 28th Ferrying Squadron and 328th Ferrying Squadron

Redesignated 28th Air Refueling Squadron on 1 September 1991
Inactivated on 15 May 1994
Redesignated 28th Expeditionary Air Refueling Squadron and converted to provisional statuson 12 June 2002
Active during 2003

=== Assignments ===
- Domestic Wing, Air Transport Command: 10 July 1942
- 6th Ferrying Group: September 1942 – 31 March 1944
- Mediterranean Air Transport Service: c. 1 June 1944 – c. June 1946
- Strategic Air Command: 19 April 1960 (not organized)
- 28th Bombardment Wing: 1 October 1960
- 28th Operations Group: 1 September 1991
- 43d Operations Group: 1 June 1992 – 15 May 1994
- Air Mobility Command to activate or inactivate as needed, 12 June 2002

40th Air Expeditionary Wing: c. 2003
379th Expeditionary Operations Group: c. 2018

=== Stations ===
- Hamilton Field, California, 10 July 1942
- Long Beach Army Air Field, California, September 1942 – 31 March 1944
- Unknown, c. 1 June 1944
- Capodichino Airport Aug 1944 – c. June 1946
- Ellsworth Air Force Base, South Dakota, 1 October 1960 – 15 May 1994
- Diego Garcia Naval Station, British Indian Ocean Territories, c. 2003
- Al Udeid Air Base, c. 2018

=== Aircraft ===
- Boeing KC-135 Stratotanker, 1960–1994, 2003, 2018
- Boeing EC-135, c. 1966–1970

== See also ==
- List of United States Air Force air refueling squadrons
