= 44th Missile Wing =

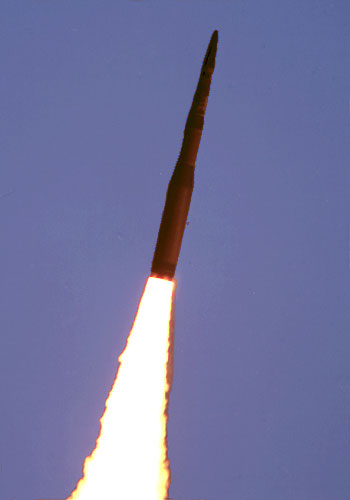
- LGM-30F Minuteman II test launch at Vandenberg AFB, California
- Active: 1950–1960; 1962–1994
- Country: United States}
- Branch: United States Air Force
- Type: Wing
- Role: Intercontinental ballistic missile
- Motto: Aggressor Beware
- Decorations: Air Force Outstanding Unit Award

Commanders
- Notable commanders: Howell M. Estes II

Insignia
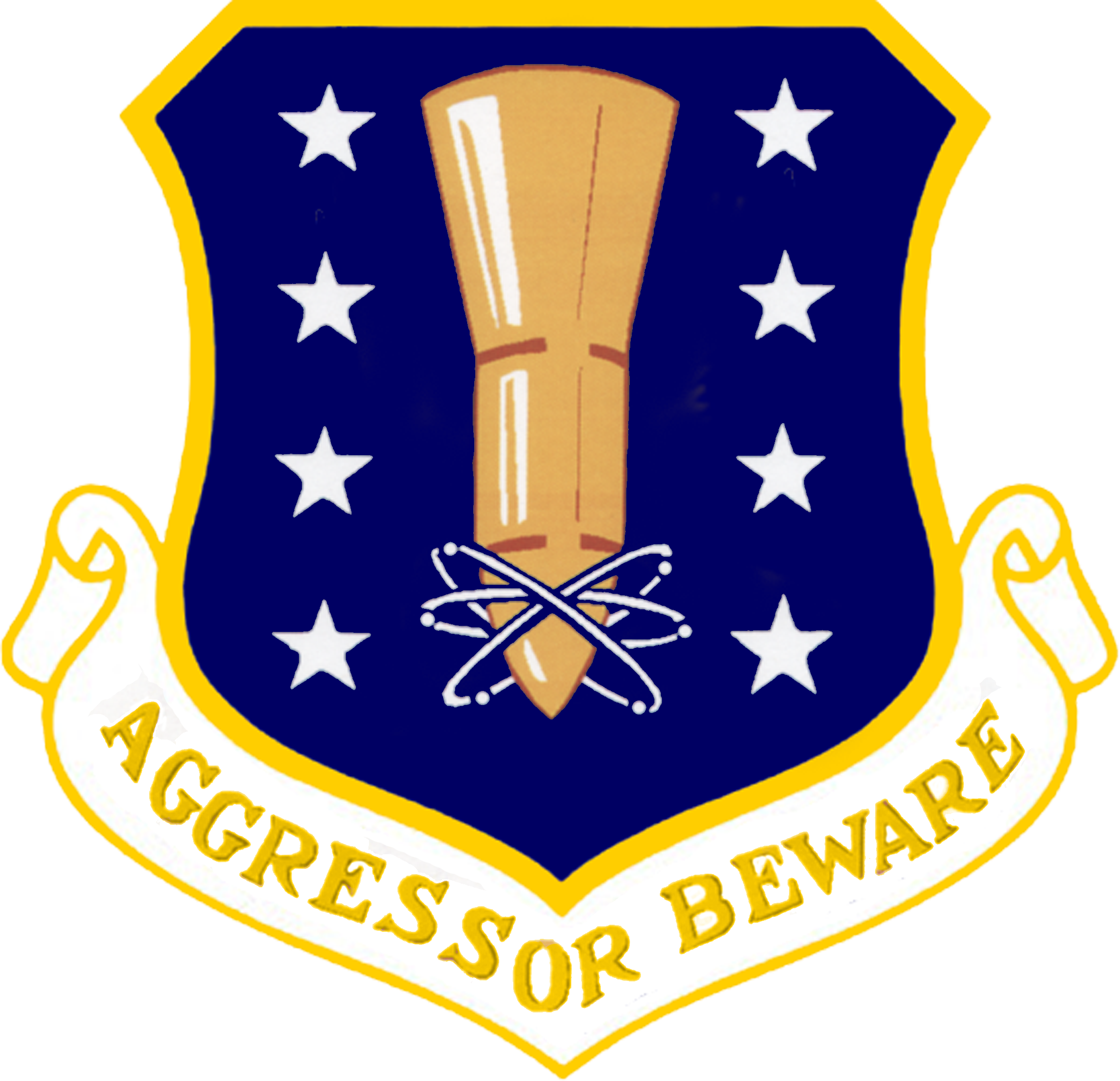
- 44th Missile Wing emblem (Note: Approved 18 July 1962.)

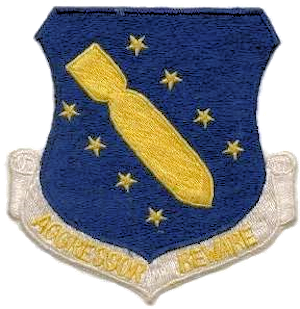
- Patch with 44th Bombardment Wing emblem (Note: Approved 15 May 1951.)

The 44th Missile Wing is an inactive United States Air Force unit. Its last assignment was with Twentieth Air Force, at Ellsworth Air Force Base, South Dakota, where it was inactivated on 4 July 1994.

For over 40 years the 44th was a front-line Strategic Air Command wing, initially as a Boeing B-47 Stratojet medium bomber unit in the 1950s. With the phaseout of the B-47, the wing became a LGM-30 Minuteman intercontinental ballistic missile unit in the 1960s, being inactivated in 1994 as part of the drawdown of U.S. strategic forces after the end of the Cold War.

== History ==
=== Bombardment Wing ===
The 44th Bombardment Wing, Medium was established in late December 1950. The new wing was organized at March Air Force Base, California where it received Boeing B-29 Superfortresses along with some TB-29s. It depended on 22d Bombardment Wing for initial cadre and help in becoming organized.

The wing moved to Lake Charles Air Force Base, Louisiana on 1 August 1951; its mission was to train B-29 and RB-29 aircrews and mechanics for combat duty with units engaged in Korean War combat duty with Far East Air Forces. From 10 October 1951 to 15 May 1952, trained all elements of the 68th Strategic Reconnaissance Wing.

Replaced the propeller-driven B-29s with new Boeing B-47E Stratojet swept-wing medium bombers in 1953, capable of flying at high subsonic speeds and primarily designed for penetrating the airspace of the Soviet Union. Deployed at Sidi Slimane Air Base, French Morocco, 19 January – 22 February 1953 and 19 April – 17 June 1954.

In the late 1950s, the B-47 was considered to be reaching obsolescence, and was being phased out of SAC's strategic arsenal as improved Soviet air defenses made the aircraft vulnerable. Began sending aircraft to other B-47 wings as replacements in late 1959, being phased down for inactivation. The 44th Bombardment Wing was inactivated on 15 June 1960; some aircraft and many personnel were reassigned to the 68th Bombardment Wing which remained at Chenault Air Force Base flying B-47s until 1963.

=== Missile Wing ===
The history of the 44th Missile Wing begins two years before its activation; with the establishment of the 850th Strategic Missile Squadron on 1 December 1960. Assigned to the 28th Bombardment Wing at Ellsworth Air Force Base, South Dakota, the 850th operated the first-generation HGM-25A Titan I intercontinental ballistic missile (ICBM) at three dispersed sites near Wicksville, Hermosa, and Sturgis SD. However the Titan I's life span was short in western South Dakota.

About the same time, work began on installations for the second-generation Minuteman missile. On 21 August 1961, construction began on the LGM-30B Minuteman I facilities. For more than a year this squadron prepared for the emplacement of the Minuteman which finally arrived in 1962, shortly after the activation of the 44th Strategic Missile Wing in January. At that time Headquarters Strategic Air Command (SAC) also named the 44th as host wing at Ellsworth. With its activation, the 850th was reassigned to the 44th, making the 28th Bombardment Wing a fully Boeing B-52 Stratofortress organization.

During 1962, three new strategic missile squadrons, the 66th, 67th, and 68th, were activated to support the new Minuteman I system. The 67th Strategic Missile Squadron joined the 44th in August, followed by the 68th Strategic Missile Squadron in September 1962. A 44th Missile Maintenance Squadron was established at the same time. Each strategic missile squadron supported five flights of Minuteman missiles with 50 missiles per squadron. A total of 150 launch facilities were constructed to house the missiles. The first Minuteman missile was positioned near Wall, SD in April 1963. All Minuteman I missiles were in place by the end of 1963.

On 19 November 1964, Secretary of Defense Robert McNamara announced the phase-out of remaining first-generation Titan I missiles by the end of June 1965. Consequently, the Titan Is of the 850th Squadron were removed from alert status on 4 January 1965. The last missile was shipped out on 12 February. The Air Force subsequently inactivated the squadron on 25 March.

Ellsworth was slated to host a unique series of operational tests. Approved by the Secretary of Defense in November 1964, "Project Long Life" called for the short-range operational base launch of three modified Minuteman IB ICBMs to provide a realistic test for this system. Each missile would contain enough propellant for a 7-second flight and have inert upper stages and reentry vehicles. On 1 March 1965, "Operation Long Life" took place. This was the first of three scheduled launches of the Minuteman system. A missile with seven seconds of fuel was launched.

With the test proving successful, the additional two launches were canceled. This was the only test launch in US ICBM history to be fired from an operational site. It successfully demonstrated the ability of a SAC missile crew to launch an ICBM.

The 44 SMW played a key role in establishing the Airborne Launch Control System (ALCS) in the late 1960s. The ALCS was created to provide a survivable launch capability for the Minuteman ICBM force. From 1967 to 1970, one of the squadrons that ALCS missile crews belonged to was the 68th SMS at Ellsworth AFB, SD. These ALCS crews worked together with the 28th Air Refueling Squadron at Ellsworth, who operated several Boeing EC-135 variants to include the EC-135A, EC-135G, and EC-135L, all of which had ALCS equipment installed on board. In 1970, the ALCS mission was transferred from the 68th to the 4th Airborne Command and Control Squadron, of the [8th Bombardment Wing at Ellsworth.

On 30 June 1971, the 44th was named host unit at Ellsworth, when the 821st Strategic Aerospace Division was inactivated. The wing was reassigned to the 4th Air Division headquartered at F.E. Warren Air Force Base, Wyoming . The wing was later assigned to the 57th Air Division headquartered at Minot Air Force Base, North Dakota.

In October 1971, the transition from Minuteman I to LGM-30F Minuteman II began. The transition, known as "Force Modernization", was complete in March 1973. With these new missiles in place, Ellsworth was selected to host "Giant Pace Test 74-1", the first Simulated Electronic Launch-Minuteman (SELM) exercise. During this test, 11 SELM-configured Minuteman II ICBMs underwent successful simulated launch on command from both underground launch-control centers and the Airborne Launch Control Center (ALCC).

During February 1991, the Secretary of Defense announced that the Air Force would begin retirement of older weapon systems in response to the end of the Cold War and a declining defense budget. The deactivation of the Minuteman II missile system was announced on 15 April 1991. The schedule for Ellsworth included a one squadron per year draw-down beginning with the 67th, followed by the 66th, and finally the 68th.

On 1 September 1991, under the Objective Wing concept adapted by the Air Force, the wing was renamed the 44th Missile Wing. The ICBM squadrons were reassigned to the newly established 44th Operations Group.

On 28 September 1991, in response to President George H. W. Bush's directive to stand down the Minuteman II, personnel of the 44 Operations Group worked around the clock to dissipate launch codes and pin safety control switches at 150 launch facilities. Removal of the first Minuteman II missile assigned to the 44 OG occurred at G-02, near Red Owl, South Dakota, on 3 December 1991. On 6 April 1992, the first launch control center shut down.

On 1 June 1992, the 44th Missile Wing was relieved of its emergency war order mission and its primary focus was deactivation of the Minuteman II weapon system. This day also marked the end of SAC and the beginning of Air Combat Command (ACC).

The 67th Missile Squadron was inactivated on 15 August 1992, and the 66th was inactivated on 1 September 1993. On 1 July 1993 the 44 Missile Wing changed hands from ACC to Air Force Space Command along with all other ICBM wings. Deactivation of the entire missile complex ended in April 1994. With its mission complete, the 44th Missile Wing was formally inactivated on 4 July 1994.

=== Lineage ===
- Established as 44th Bombardment Wing, Medium, on 20 December 1950

Activated on 2 January 1951
Discontinued on 15 June 1960
Redesignated 44th Strategic Missile Wing (ICBM—Minuteman) on 24 November 1961
Organized on 1 January 1962
Redesignated: 44th Missile Wing 1 September 1991
Inactivated 5 July 1994

=== Assignments ===
- Fifteenth Air Force, 20 December 1950
- 12th Air Division, 10 February 1951
- 21st Air Division, 4 August 1951
- 806th Air Division, 16 June 1952 (attached to: 5th Air Division from 19 January to 22 February 1953); 9 April to 17 June 1954)
- Department of the Air Force, 15 June 1960 – 23 November 1961
- 821st Strategic Aerospace Division, 1 January 1962
- 4th Strategic Missile Division, 30 June 1971
- 57th Air Division, 1 May 1982
- 4th Air Division, 23 January 1987
- 12th Air Division, 15 July 1988
- Strategic Warfare Center, 31 July 1990
- Twentieth Air Force, 31 July 1991 – 5 July 1994

=== Components ===
Group

- 44th Bombardment Group (later 44th Operations Group): 2 January 1951 – 16 June 1952 (not operational, 10 February 1951 – 16 June 1952), 1 September 1991 – 5 July 1994

Squadrons

- 44th Air Refueling Squadron: 20 April 1953 – 1 June 1960 (not operational, 20 April – c. 15 May 1953; detached 27 June – 11 October 1957)
- 66th Bombardment Squadron (later 66th Strategic Missile Squadron, 66th Missile Squadron): 16 Jun 1952 – 15 Jun 1960; 1 Sep 1962 – 1 Sep 1991
- 67th Bombardment Squadron (later 67th Strategic Missile Squadron, 67th Missile Squadron): 16 Jun 1952 – 15 Jun 1960; 1 Sep 1962 – 1 Sep 1991
- 68th Bombardment Squadron (later 68th Strategic Missile Squadron, 68th Missile Squadron): 16 Jun 1952 – 15 Jun 1960; 1 Sep 1962 – 1 Sep 1991
- 506th Bombardment Squadron: 1 December 1958 – 15 June 1960
- 850th Strategic Missile Squadron: 1 January 1962 – 25 March 1965

=== Stations ===
- March Air Force Base, California, 2 January 1951 – 1 August 1951
- Lake Charles air Force Base (later Chennault Air Force Base), Louisiana 1 August 1951 – 15 June 1960

Deployed at Sidi Slimane Air Base, French Morocco, 19 January – 22 February 1953 and 19 April – 17 June 1954.

- Ellsworth Air Force Base, South Dakota, 24 November 1961 – 5 July 1994

=== Aircraft and missiles ===
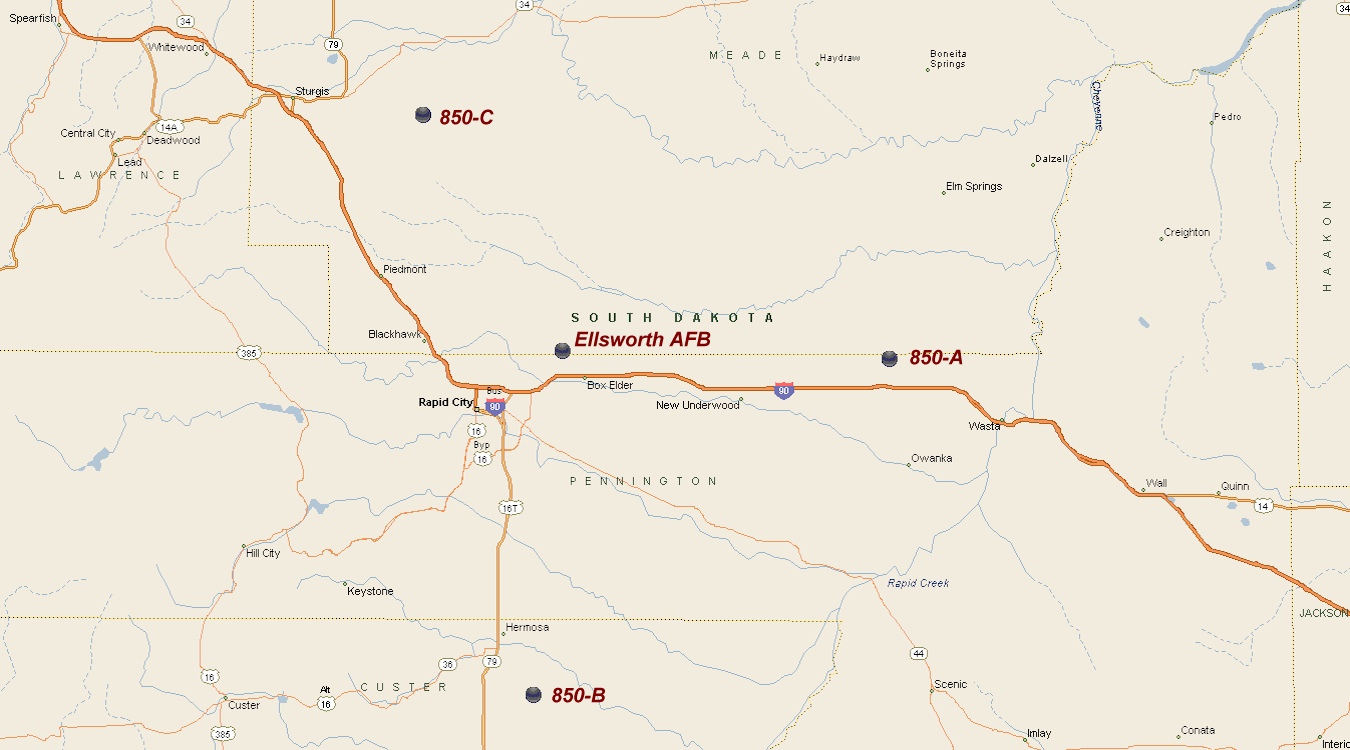
HGM-25A Titan I Missile Sites

- Boeing TB-29 Superfortress, 1951
- Boeing B-29 Superfortress, 1951–1953
- Boeing B-47 Stratojet, 1953–1960
- Boeing KC-97 Stratofreighter, 1953–1957, 1957–1960
- HGM-25A Titan I, 1962–1965

Operated three missile sites: (1 Dec 1960 – 25 Mar 1965)

850-A, 4 miles NNW of Wicksville, South Dakota 44°08′10″N 102°37′02″W
850-B, 5 miles SSE of Hermosa, South Dakota 43°46′34″N 103°08′46″W
850-C, 10 miles SE of Sturgis, South Dakota 44°23′51″N 103°18′48″W

- LGM-30B Minuteman I, 1963–1973
- Airborne Launch Control System, 1967–1970
- LGM-30F Minuteman II, 1971–1994

LGM-30F Minuteman III Missile Alert Facilities (MAF) (each controlling 10 missiles) are located as follows:

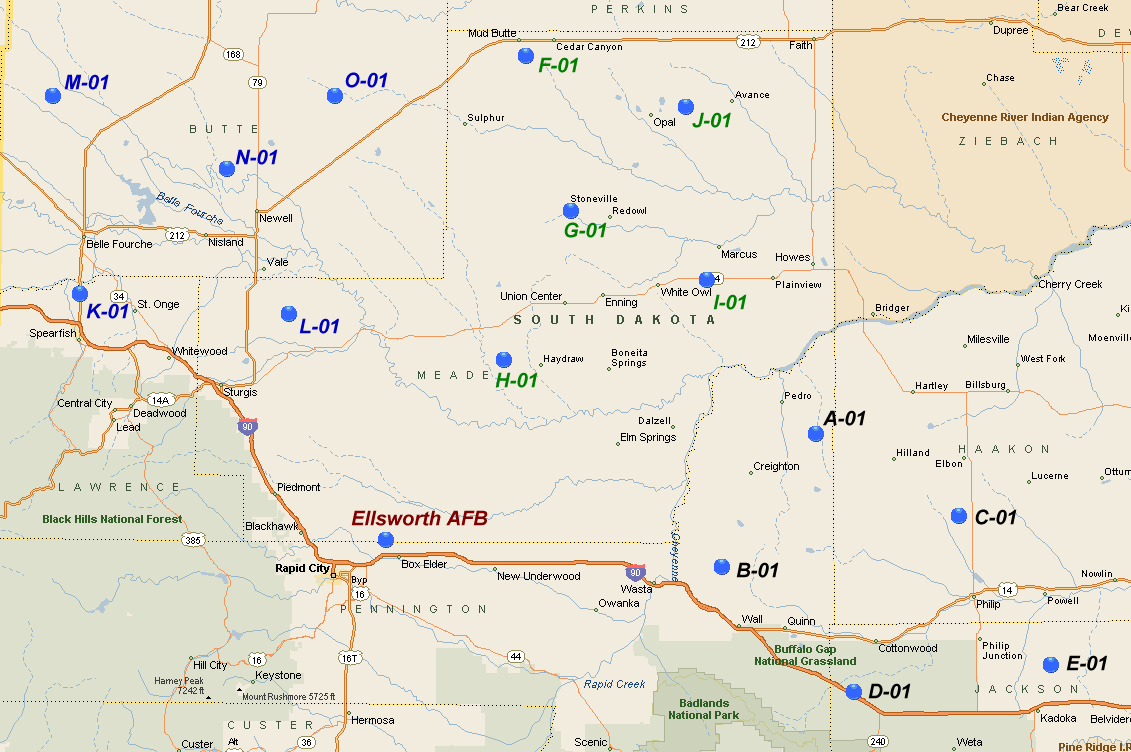
LGM-30 Minuteman Missile Alert Facilities

66th Missile Squadron

A-01 19.9 mi S of Howes, SD, 44°19′52″N 102°03′03″W
B-01 7.5 mi NxNW of Wall SD, 44°05′56″N 102°17′01″W
C-01 10.1 mi N of Philip SD, 44°11′01″N 101°42′09″W
*D-01 6.7 mi SxSW of Cottonwood SD, 43°52′40″N 101°57′42″W

*D-09 (Launch Facility) 4.4 mi SxSW of Quinn SD, 43°55′53″N 102°09′36″W
*Designated as part of the Minuteman Missile National Historic Site

E-01 6.3 mi NxNE of Kadoka SD, 43°55′12″N 101°28′52″W

67th Missile Squadron

F-01 61.0 mi NxNE of Ellsworth AFB, SD. 44°59′49″N 102°45′43″W
G-01 11.3 mi N of Union Center SD, 44°43′25″N 102°39′00″W
H-01 10.0 mi SW of Union Center SD, 44°27′43″N 102°48′55″W
I-01 5.7 mi E of White Owl SD, 44°36′10″N 102°18′57″W
J-01 13.8 mi SE of Maurine SD, 44°54′20″N 102°21′55″W

68th Missile Squadron

K-01 5.6 mi N of Spearfish SD, 44°34′22″N 103°51′42″W
L-01 6.2 mi SxSE of Vale SD, 44°32′29″N 103°20′42″W
M-01 17.7 mi NxNW of Belle Fourche SD, 44°55′09″N 103°56′07″W
N-01 6.7 mi NW of Newell SD, 44°47′41″N 103°30′09″W
O-01 38.5 mi W of opal, SD, 44°55′29″N 103°14′13″W

== See also ==
- List of B-29 Superfortress operators
- List of B-47 units of the United States Air Force
- 44th Missile Wing LGM-30 Minuteman Missile Launch Sites
