= 67th Missile Squadron =

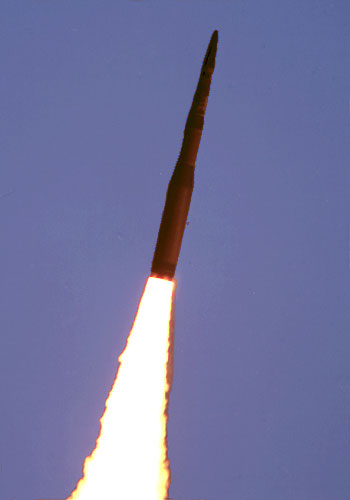
- LGM-30F Minuteman II test launch at Vandenberg AFB, California
- Active: 1940–1946; 1947–1948; 1950–1960; 1962–-1993
- Country: United States
- Branch: United States Air Force
- Type: Squadron
- Role: Intercontinental ballistic missile
- Engagements: World War II Antisubmarine Campaign American Theater European Theater of Operations

- Decorations: Distinguished Unit Citation (2x) Air Force Outstanding Unit Award

Insignia
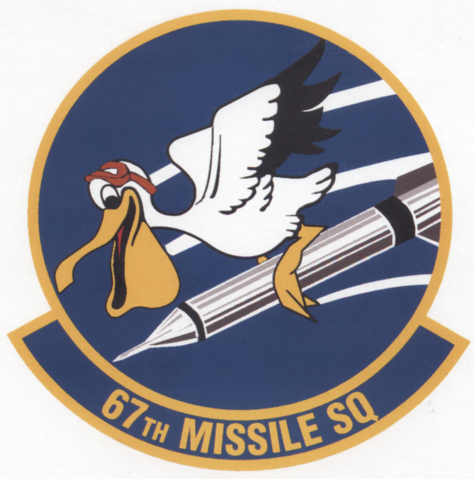
- 67th Strategic Missile Squadron emblem

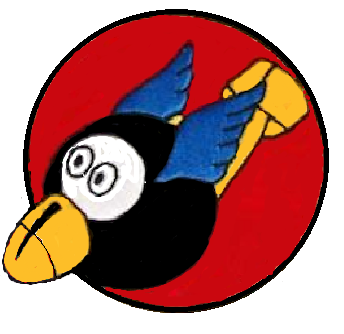
- 67th Bombardment Squadron emblem(European Theater)

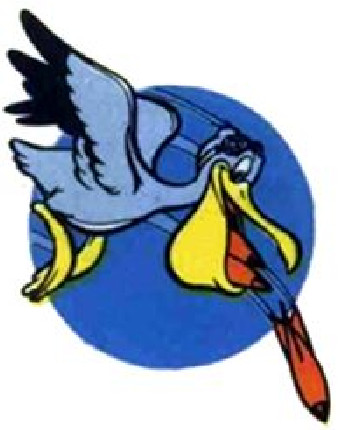
- 67th Bombardment Squadron emblem (Note: Approved 12 July 1943. Description: Over and through a medium blue disc, a caricatured penguin light blue, white and black, bill and feet yellow, wearing brown aviator's goggles, diving toawards sinister base, dumping out one of three red aerial bombs, trimmed black, hed in pouch of bill, all emitting white speed lines.)
- Worlw War II fuselage code: NB

The 67th Missile Squadron is an inactive United States Air Force unit. It was last assigned to the 44th Operations Group, stationed at Ellsworth Air Force Base, South Dakota.

The 67th was equipped with the LGM-30F Minuteman II Intercontinental ballistic missile, with a mission of nuclear deterrence. With the end of the Cold War, the 67th was inactivated on 15 August 1992.

== History ==
=== World War II ===
The squadron was first activated in January 1941 as the 67th Bombardment Squadron at MacDill Field, Florida as one of the original squadrons of the 44th Bombardment Group. The squadron was equipped with Consolidated B-24 Liberators. Following the Japanese attack on Pearl Harbor, the squadron began to participate in antisubmarine patrols. Although the squadron briefly became an Operational Training Unit in February 1942, it began intensive training for deployment to the European Theater of Operations in July.

Deployed to the European Theater of Operations, it was assigned to VIII Bomber Command in England during the summer of 1942. One of the first B-24 Liberator units assigned to the ETO, the squadron was engaged in very long range strategic bombardment missions over Occupied Europe and Nazi Germany, attacking strategic targets in France, Belgium, the Netherlands and Germany. Among the targets attacked were submarine installations, industrial establishments, airfields, harbors and shipyards.

A detachment deployed to the Ninth Air Force in Algeria in June 1943 to help facilitate the Allied invasion of Sicily by bombing airfields and marshalling yards in Italy. The detachment also participated in the low-level raid on the Ploiești oil fields in Romania on 1 August 1943. Most of the detachment returned to England at the end of August, however some crews and aircraft remained in the Mediterranean Theater of Operations (MTO) and flew very long range attacks over Italy, Romania, Austria and Sicily and supported Allied ground forces in Sicily as well as attacking Axis forces in Italy. The squadron also supported the Salerno landing. All aircraft and personnel returned to England in October. Example: Missions of Capt. James E. Hill and his 10-man B-24 crew in 1943:

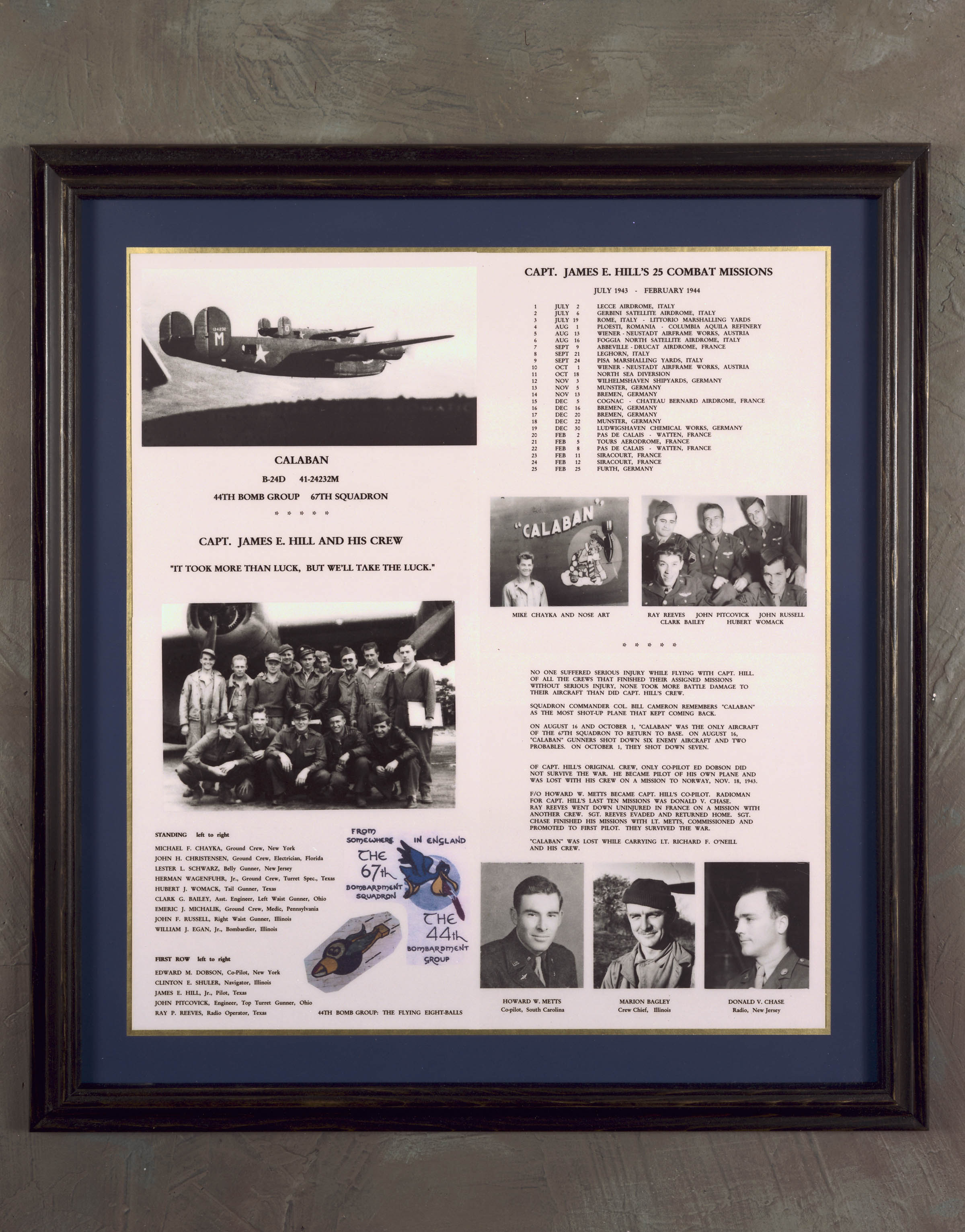

The squadron returned to VIII Bomber Command operations and supported the Allied Invasion of France in June 1944 by attacking strongpoints in the beachhead area and transportation targets behind the front line. The group aided the Caen offensive and the Saint-Lô breakthrough in July. It dropped food, ammunition and other supplies to troops engaged in the airborne attack on the Netherlands in September. It attacked enemy targets during the Battle of the Bulge between December 1944 and January 1945, by striking bridges, tunnels, rail and road junctions and communications in the battle area. The squadron attacked airfields and transportation in support of the Western Allied Invasion of Germany, and flew a resupply mission during the airborne assault across the Rhine in March 1945. Combat operations concluded with the German capitulation in May 1945.

The unit returned to the United States in June 1945, being reassigned to the Second Air Force and reorganized as a Boeing B-29 Superfortress 'very heavy' bombardment squadron. It trained with B-29s and planned to deploy to the Western Pacific, however the Japanese capitulation in August canceled these plans. It was assigned to Kansas as part of the Continental Air Forces, (later Strategic Air Command or SAC), but it was inactivated in July 1946 as part of the general demobilization of the Army Air Forces.

=== Strategic Air Command ===
Reactivated in 1947 under SAC as a paper unit, it was not manned or equipped and was inactivated in 1949 due to budget constraints.

It was re-activated in 1950 and used as an Operational Training Unit for B-29 aircrews and maintenance personnel being deployed to the Far East Air Forces during the Korean War. The propeller-driven B-29s were replaced with new Boeing B-47E Stratojet swept-wing medium bombers in 1953. These aircraft were capable of flying at high subsonic speeds and primarily designed for penetrating the airspace of the Soviet Union.
The B-47 was considered to be reaching obsolescence in the late 1950s and were being phased out of SAC's strategic arsenal. The squadron began sending aircraft to other B-47 wings as replacements in late 1959, before being phased down for inactivation in 1960.

=== Intercontinental Ballistic Missile Squadron ===
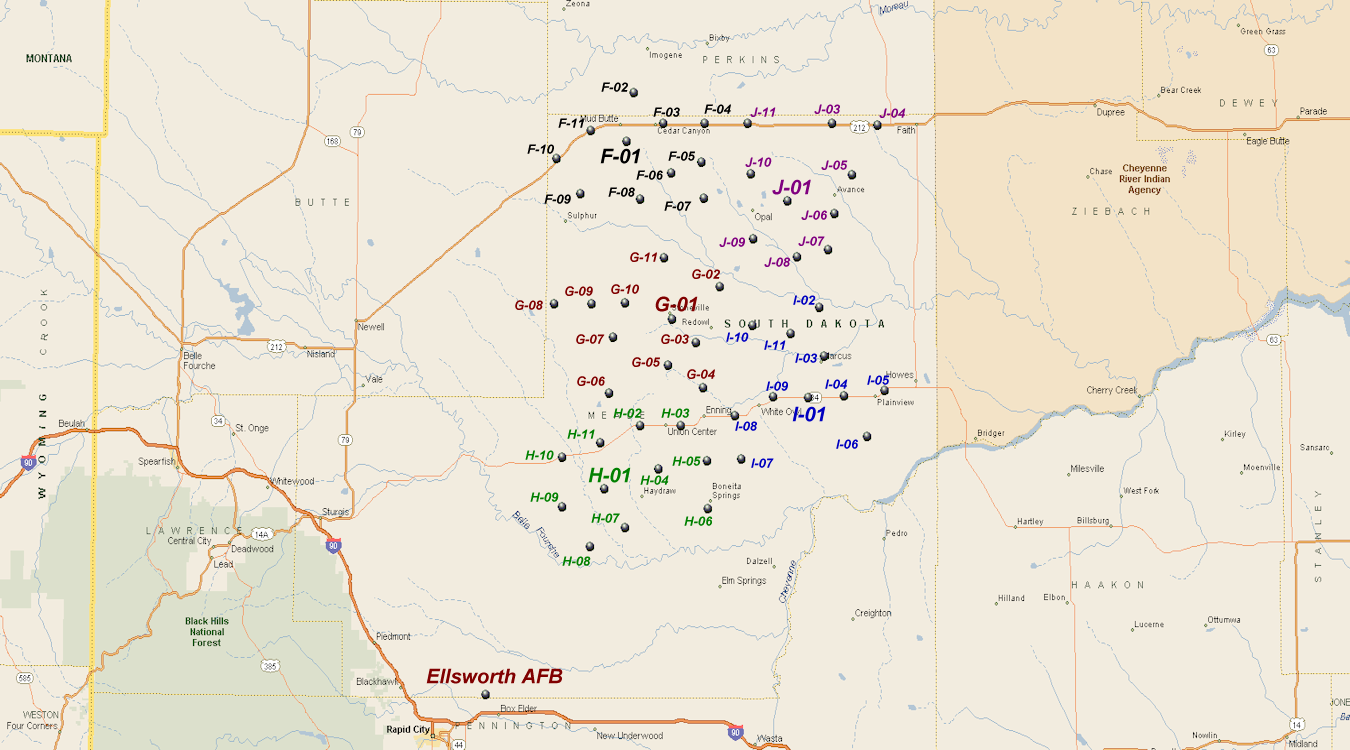
LGM-30 Minuteman Missile Alert and Launch Facilities

67th Missile Squadron Launch Facilities

Missile Alert Facilities (F-J flights, each controlling 10 missiles) are located as follows:

F-01 61.0 mi NxNE of Ellsworth AFB, SD. 44°59′49″N 102°45′43″W
G-01 11.3 mi N of Union Center SD, 44°43′25″N 102°39′00″W
H-01 10.0 mi SW of Union Center SD, 44°27′43″N 102°48′55″W
I-01 5.7 mi E of White Owl SD, 44°36′10″N 102°18′57″W
J-01 13.8 mi SE of Maurine SD, 44°54′20″N 102°21′55″W

The unit was reactivated in 1962 as a SAC Intercontinental ballistic missile squadron. It trained with the 850th Strategic Missile Squadron with HGM-25A Titan I operations in 1962 and became operational with LGM-30B Minuteman I missiles in 1963. It upgraded to the LGM-30F Minuteman II in 1972. The squadron remained on Cold War nuclear alert until President Bush's directive to stand the Minuteman II down. Dissipated launch codes and pin safety control switches at 15 launch control facilities. Deactivation of the entire missile complex ended in the summer of 1992, the squadron inactivated on 15 August.

== Lineage ==
- Constituted as the 67th Bombardment Squadron (Heavy) on 20 November 1940

Activated on 15 Jan 1941
Redesignated 67th Bombardment Squadron, Heavy on 20 August 1943
Redesignated 67th Bombardment Squadron, Very Heavy on 5 August 1945
Inactivated on 12 July 1946
Activated on 1 July 1947
Inactivated on 6 September 1948
Redesignated 67th Bombardment Squadron, Medium on 20 December 1950
Activated on 2 January 1951
Discontinued on 15 June 1960
Redesignated 67th Strategic Missile Squadron on 19 March 1962
Organized on 1 August 1962
Redesignated 67th Missile Squadron on 1 September 1991
Inactivated on 15 August 1992

=== Assignments ===
- 44th Bombardment Group, 15 January 1941 – 12 July 1946
- 44th Bombardment Group, 1 July 1947 – 6 September 1948
- 44th Bombardment Group, 2 January 1951 (attached to 44th Bombardment Wing after 10 February 1951)
- 44th Bombardment Wing, 16 June 1952
- Department of the Air Force, 15 June 1960 (not organized)
- Strategic Air Command, 19 March 1962 (not organized)
- 44th Strategic Missile Wing, 1 August 1962
- 44th Operations Group, 1 September 1991 – 1 September 1993

=== Stations ===
- MacDill Field, Florida, 15 January 1941
- Barksdale Field, Louisiana, 9 February 1942
- Will Rogers Field, Oklahoma, c. 21 July-25 August 1942
- RAF Cheddington (Station 113), England, 10 September 1942
- RAF Shipdham (Station 115), England, c. 10 October 1942-c. 15 June 1945
- Sioux Falls Army Air Field, South Dakota, 26 June 1945
- Great Bend Army Air Field, Kansas, 24 July 1945
- Smoky Hill Army Air Field, Kansas, c. 12 December 1945 – 12 July 1946
- Andrews Field (later Andrews Air Force Base), Maryland, July 1947-6 September 1948
- March Air Force Base, California, 2 January 1951
- Lake Charles Air Force Base (later Chenault Air Force Base), Louisiana, 1 August 1951 – 15 June 1960
- Ellsworth Air Force Base, South Dakota, 1 September 1962 – 15 August 1992

=== Aircraft and missiles ===
- Consolidated B-24 Liberator, 1941–1945
- Boeing B-29 Superfortress, 1945–1946; 1951–1952
- Boeing TB-29 Superfortress, 1951
- Boeing B-47 Stratojet, 1953–1960
- LGM-30B Minuteman I, 1963–1973
- LGM-30F Minuteman II, 1972–1992

== See also ==
- List of United States Air Force missile squadrons
