= RAF Cheddington =

Former RAF base in Buckinghamshire, England

RAF Cheddington RAF Marsworth USAAF Station 113
- Near Cheddington, Buckinghamshire in England
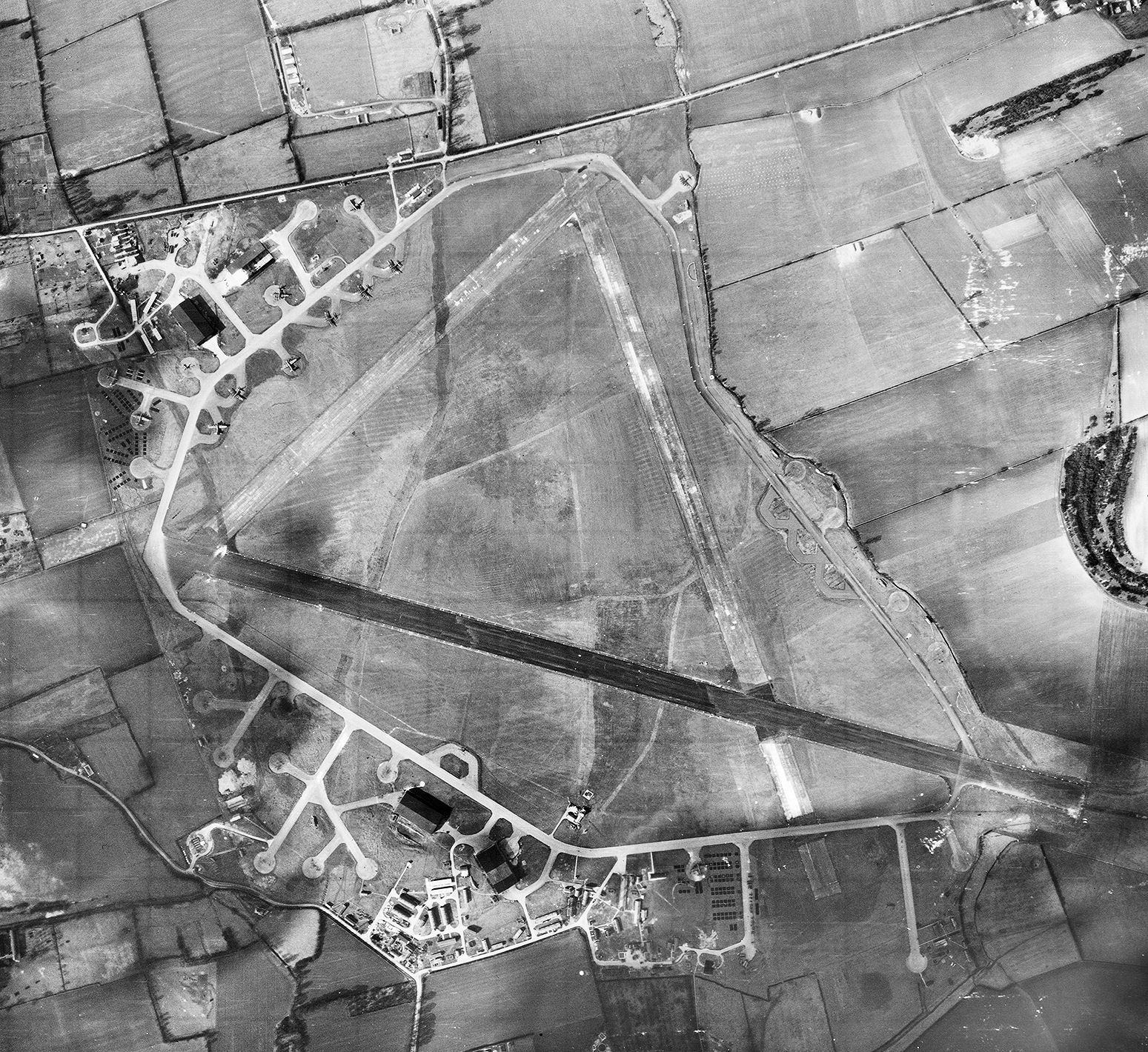
- Aerial photograph looking north, the bomb dump at the top, the control tower and technical site are at the bottom, 3 March 1944. Note the many Boeing B-17 Flying Fortresses parked on the loop hardstands.

Site information
- Type: Royal Air Force station
- Code: CZ
- Owner: Air Ministry
- Operator: Royal Air Force; United States Army Air Forces
- Controlled by: RAF Bomber Command * No. 7 (T) Group RAF * No. 92 (OTU) Group RAF; Eighth Air Force

Location
- Shown within Buckinghamshire RAF Cheddington (the United Kingdom)
- Coordinates: 51°50′05.20″N 000°40′52.50″W

Site history
- Built: 1917 & 1941/42
- Built by: WW2: George Wimpey & Co Ltd
- In use: 1917 - 19; March 1942 – 1952
- Battles/wars: European Theatre of World War II; Air Offensive, Europe July 1942 – May 1945

Airfield information
- Elevation: 93 metres (305 ft) AMSL
Runways
Direction	Length and surface
00/00	Concrete
00/00	Concrete
00/00	Concrete

Royal Air Force Cheddington or more simply RAF Cheddington (also known as RAF Marsworth) is a former Royal Air Force station located 1 mile (1.6 km) south-west of Cheddington, Buckinghamshire, England. The airfield was closed in 1952.

== Origins ==
Cheddington was used as a First World War aerodrome briefly during 1917. The airfield was closed after the Armistice.

== Operational use ==
During the Second World War, Cheddington Airfield opened in March 1942 as a satellite station to RAF Wing, with No. 26 Operational Training Unit, Vickers Wellington bombers (these had the codes "EU" on the aircraft sides).

The following units were here at some point:

- Detachment of No. 2 Glider Training School RAF (February - March 1943)
- No. 248 Maintenance Unit RAF (? - July 1948)
- No. 4251 Anti-Aircraft Flight RAF Regiment

In September 1942 the airfield was transferred to the United States Army Air Forces. The Eighth Air Force 44th Bombardment Group was assigned to Cheddington, and three Consolidated B-24 Liberator squadrons (66th, 67th, 68th) had arrived from the United States. However, Eighth Air Force wanted to move the Liberator groups to Norfolk, and the 44th moved to RAF Shipdham in October.

With the movement of the Americans to Norfolk, the RAF transferred the No. 26 OTU back to Cheddington.

It was again transferred to the USAAF Eighth Air Force in August 1943 to become station 113, with Consolidated B-24 Liberator bombers of the Combat Crew Replacement Center, 8th Air Force. Also the 50th Fighter Squadron (8th Reconnaissance Group) was assigned to the station 15 March-12 April 1944, but was not made operational.

In 1944 specialist USAAF units arrived to perform special operations missions from the airfield, performing night leaflet drops over occupied areas of Europe, working with various special operations organizations, as well as electronic countermeasure (ECM) missions. Known squadrons assigned were:

- 858th Bombardment Squadron (VIII Air Force Composite Command) 11–27 May 1944 (B-24 Liberator)
- 858th Bombardment Squadron (VIII Air Force Composite Command) 19 June – 10 August 1944 (B-24 Liberator, B-17 for leaflet drops)
- 406th (Night Leaflet) Bombardment Squadron (VIII Air Force Composite Command) 5 August 1944 – 16 March 1945 (B017 Flying Fortress, B-24 Liberator)
- 36th Bombardment Squadron (RCM) (VIII Air Force Composite Command) 15 August 1944 – 28 February 1945 (Boeing B-17 Flying Fortress, B-24 Liberator), Radio Counter Measures warfare

The result of these special operations missions was that the majority of surrendering German troops carried safe conduct passes dropped by these squadrons. Another psychological warfare tool was forged ration cards that disrupted local economies, when bearers flooded stores for scarce food goods.

The 36th Bomb Squadron flew specially equipped B-17s and B-24s to jam enemy early warning radars and telecommunications, screen assembly and inbound flights of Allied bombers, and spoof the enemy into thinking that other bomber formations (nonexistent) were assembling. This early form of electronic warfare was very successful in disrupting German forces.

== Postwar use ==
After the war, the Royal Air Force used the airfield as a hospital, and the British Army used it for a store area. Following use by the CIA, the site eventually closed in 1952.

A memorial to all staff based at Cheddington during World War II was erected by the Cheddington (STN113) Association in 1980. It can be seen on the Marsworth to Long Marston road, next to the old guard room. Built within the memorial is an old runway light. The unveiling was accompanied by several aircraft overflying the memorial, including an RAF RCM Canberra, a USAF F-4 Phantom and a vintage Piper Cub.

== See also ==
- List of former Royal Air Force stations
