= Seth J. McKee =

United States Air Force general

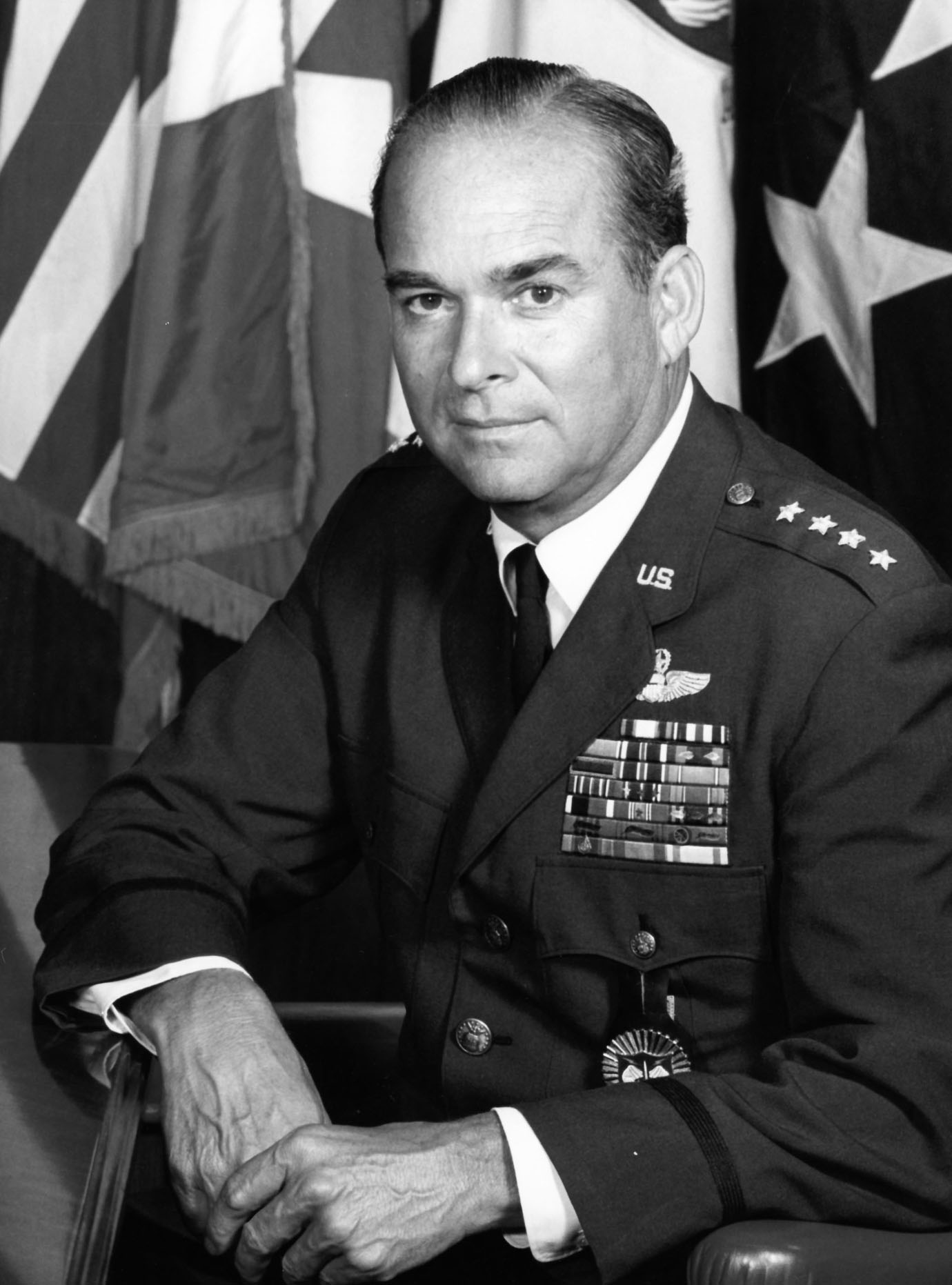
- General Seth J. McKee
- Born: November 6, 1916; McGehee, Arkansas, U.S.
- Died: December 26, 2016 (aged 100); Scottsdale, Arizona, U.S.
- Military career
- Allegiance: United States
- Branch: United States Army (1935–47); United States Air Force (1947–73)
- Service years: 1935–1973
- Rank: General
- Commands: North American Air Defense Command; United States Forces Japan; Fifth Air Force; 821st Strategic Aerospace Division; 823d Air Division; 2d Bombardment Wing
- Conflicts: World War II
- Awards: Air Force Distinguished Service Medal; Silver Star; Legion of Merit (3); Distinguished Flying Cross; Air Medal (11)

Seth Jefferson McKee (November 6, 1916 – December 26, 2016) was a United States Air Force general who served as Commander in Chief, North American Air Defense Command/Commander in Chief, Continental Air Defense Command from 1969 to 1973.

== Early life ==
McKee was born in 1916, in McGehee, Arkansas. Following graduation from Cape Girardeau High School in Missouri in 1934, he attended Southeast Missouri State Teachers College for three years and the University of Oklahoma for a half year. He began his military career in 1935, as a member of the Missouri Army National Guard, and his Army Air Corps career as an aviation cadet in February 1938. He graduated from flight training in February 1939.

== Military career ==
From February 1939 until January 1944, McKee served in operations and command positions at squadron and group levels. He then went to the European Theater of Operations and was named deputy commander of the 370th Fighter Group in England. He assumed command of the 370th Group in November 1944 and served in France, Belgium and Germany. During World War II he logged more than 190 hours in 69 combat missions in the P-38 Lightning and is credited with destroying two enemy aircraft. At the end of World War II he returned to the United States and served with the 3501st Army Air Forces Bases Unit at Boca Raton Army Air Field in Boca Raton, Florida as commander of the Army Air Forces Radar School. In January 1947 he entered the University of Oklahoma as a student officer and graduated in August 1947 with a Bachelor of Arts degree in government.

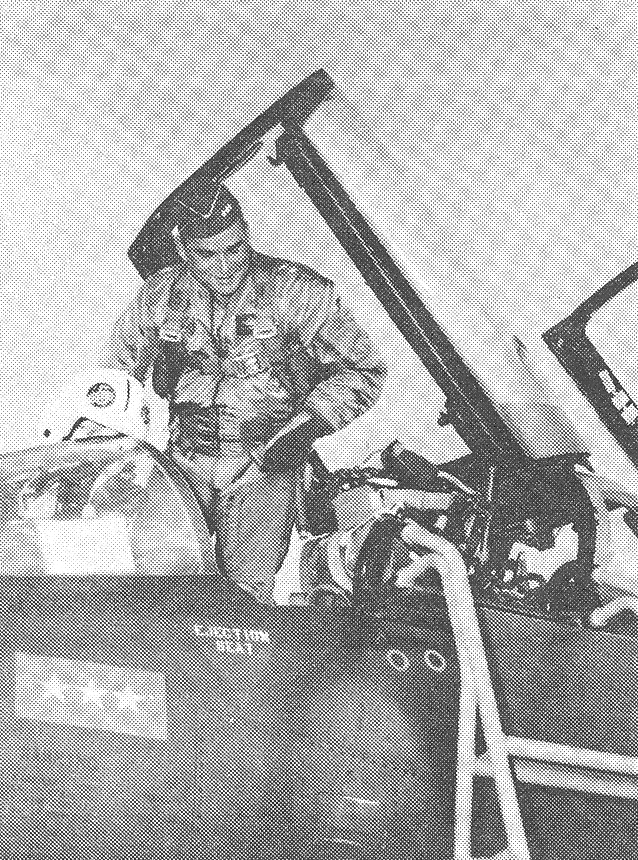
As Fifth Air Force Commander, arriving at Osan Air Base, South Korea, in an F-4 Phantom II fighter, 1968.

After graduation McKee was assigned to Headquarters, Twelfth Air Force, March Air Force Base, California, where he was chief of the Operations and Training Division and later director of plans. In July 1948 he entered Air Command and Staff School, Maxwell Air Force Base, Alabama. After graduation he served as director of the Air Force Reserve at Twelfth Air Force until April 1950. In May 1950 he was assigned to the Air Force Section of the Military Assistance Advisory Group in Rome, Italy, as chief, Technical Advisor to the Italian Air Force. He held this position until July 1951, when he was assigned to Headquarters United States Air Forces in Europe, as chief of the Training Branch, Operations and Training Division. In December 1951 he was appointed commander of the 36th Fighter Bomber Group in Europe.

In June 1953 McKee returned to the United States and was assigned to Headquarters United States Air Force as staff planning officer in the office of the Deputy Chief of Staff for Operations. In February 1954 he was named assistant secretary of the Air Force Council, Office of the Vice Chief of Staff. In July 1956 McKee was transferred to Hunter Air Force Base, Georgia, as deputy commander of the 308th Bombardment Wing. Then on 15 Dec 1956, he was assigned as commander, 2d Bombardment Wing. In August 1958 he assumed command of the 823d Air Division, Homestead Air Force Base, Florida. McKee was assigned to Headquarters, Strategic Air Command, Offutt Air Force Base, Nebraska, in October 1959, as deputy director of plans and later was named director of plans. In February 1964 he became commander of the 821st Strategic Aerospace Division at Ellsworth Air Force Base, South Dakota. In January 1965 McKee was reassigned to Headquarters United States Air Force, Washington, D.C., and named director of plans, Office of the Deputy Chief of Staff, Plans and Operations. In July 1965 he was assigned duty as assistant deputy chief of staff, plans and operations for Joint Chiefs of Staff matters.

In July 1966 McKee was named commander of United States Forces Japan and Fifth Air Force with headquarters at Fuchu Air Station, Japan. McKee was appointed assistant vice chief of staff, United States Air Force, in Washington, D.C., in July 1968. On 1 August 1969 McKee was named commander in chief of North American Air Defense Command and Continental Air Defense Command (NORAD/CONAD), with headquarters at Ent Air Force Base, Colorado. At this time, he received his fourth star. In July 1973 he was assigned additional duty as commander of United States Aerospace Defense Command.

McKee's military decorations and awards include the Air Force Distinguished Service Medal, Silver Star, Legion of Merit with two oak leaf clusters, Distinguished Flying Cross, Air Medal with 10 oak leaf clusters, Croix de Guerre with Palm (France), Croix de Guerre with Palm (Belgium), Belgian Fourragere, Order of Leopold with Palm (Belgium), First Class Order of the Crown of Thailand, Order of the Sacred Treasure, First Class (Japan), and Order of National Security Merit, Second Class (Republic of Korea).

== Later life and death ==
McKee retired from the Air Force on September 30, 1973. He turned 100 in November 2016. McKee died on December 26, 2016, as the highest-ranking survivor of D-Day.

== Effective dates of promotion ==
Insignia	Rank	Date
	General	August 1, 1969
	Lieutenant general	August 1, 1966
	Major general	July 1, 1962
	Brigadier general	August 1, 1959
	Colonel	January 19, 1951
	Lieutenant colonel	February 5, 1944
	Major	June 12, 1942
	Captain	March 1, 1942
	First lieutenant	February 21, 1941
	Second lieutenant	February 2, 1939
