= Robert C. Hinson =

United States Air Force general

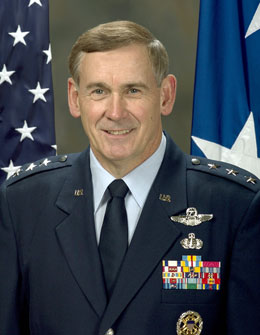
Robert Hinson in 2003

Robert C. Hinson is a retired lieutenant general in the United States Air Force.

== Career ==
Hinson originally enlisted in the Air Force before being commissioned an officer in 1971. From 1973 to 1977, he served as a Boeing B-52 Stratofortress co-pilot, aircraft commander and instructor pilot with the 97th Bombardment Wing at Blytheville Air Force Base, AR.

Hinson served as air staff training program officer on the United States Secretary of the Air Force Personnel Council at The Pentagon from 1977 until 1978, at which time he entered General Dynamics-Grumman F-111B training at Plattsburgh Air Force Base. From 1979 to 1982, he served as a F-111B pilot, instructor pilot and flight evaluator with the 529th Bombardment Squadron. After serving with Strategic Air Command at Offutt Air Force Base, Hinson assumed command of the 529th Bombardment Squadron before being reassigned as deputy commander for operations of the 380th Bombardment Wing.

From 1989 to 1991, Hinson was assigned to the Office of the Joint Chiefs of Staff before being stationed at Ellsworth Air Force Base, where he eventually assumed command of the 99th Tactics and Training Wing. In 1993, he was named deputy director of plans and programs of Air Combat Command at Langley Air Force Base. The following year, Hinson returned to Ellsworth Air Force Base as installation commander and also assumed command of the 28th Bomb Wing.

After serving as commander of the 45th Space Wing and director of the Eastern Range at Patrick Air Force Base, Hinson was named director of operations of Air Force Space Command at Peterson Air Force Base. From 1999 to 2000, he served as commander of the Fourteenth Air Force at Vandenberg Air Force Base.

In 2000, he returned to Offutt Air Force Base as deputy commander-in-chief of United States Strategic Command. He then returned to Air Force Space Command as vice commander in 2002. Hinson's retirement was effective as of September 1, 2003. As a civilian, he has worked as an executive with Northrop Grumman.

Awards he received during his military career include the Defense Distinguished Service Medal, the Air Force Distinguished Service Medal, the Defense Superior Service Medal, the Legion of Merit, the Meritorious Service Medal with three oak leaf clusters, the Air Force Commendation Medal with oak leaf cluster, the Air Force Achievement Medal, the Joint Meritorious Unit Award with oak leaf cluster, the Organizational Excellence Award, the Combat Readiness Medal with oak leaf cluster, the Air Force Good Conduct Medal and the National Defense Service Medal with service star.

== Education ==
- University of Tennessee
- Arkansas State University
- John F. Kennedy School of Government – Harvard University
- Squadron Officer School
- Air Command and Staff College
- National War College
