= 28th Bomb Wing =

US Air Force unit

28th Bomb Wing

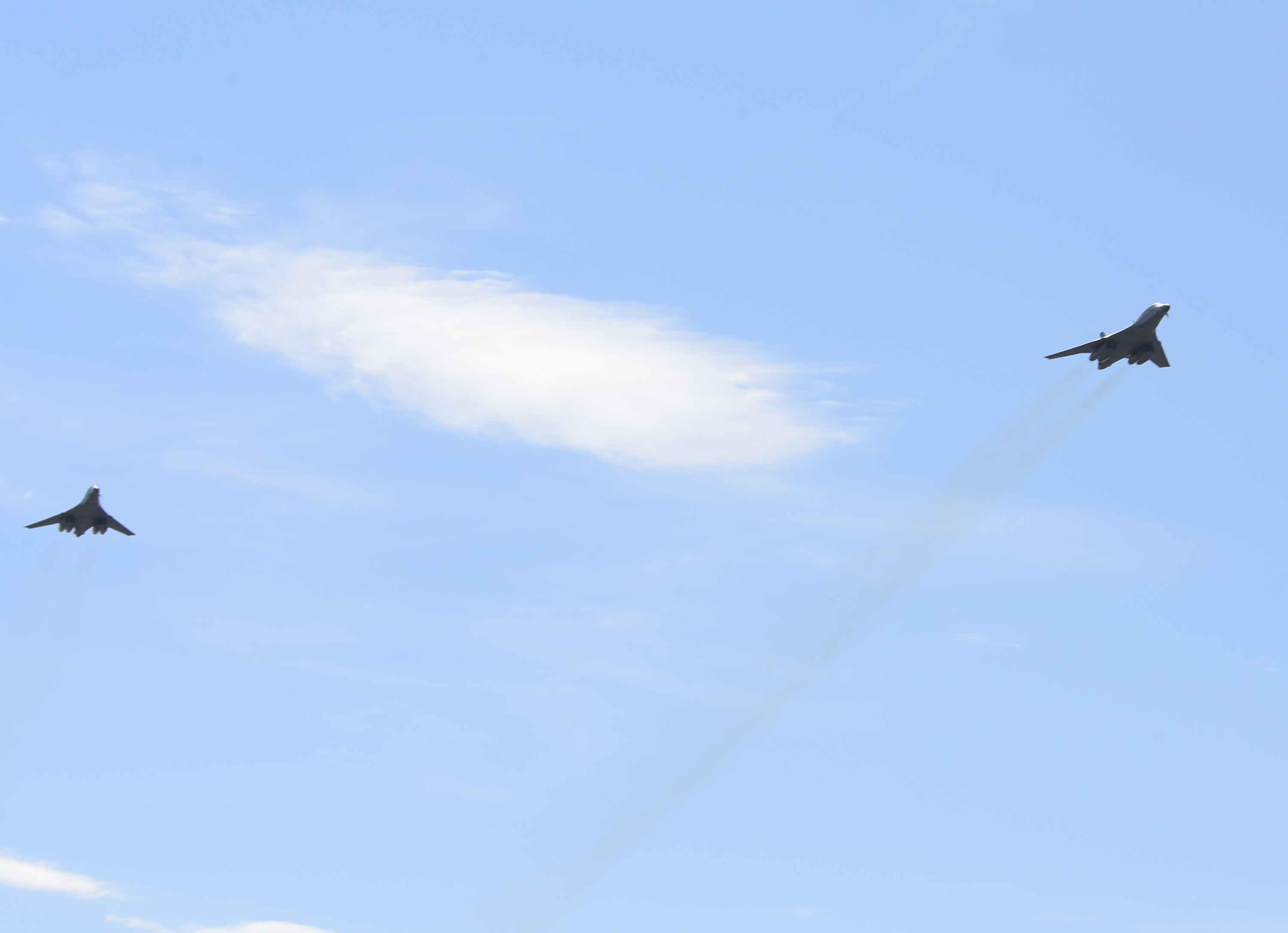
- Two U.S. Air Force B-1 Lancer bombers, from the 28th Bomb Wing, Ellsworth Air Force Base, S.D., fly over the National Museum of the United States Air Force at Wright-Patterson AFB, Ohio, 18 April 2017, on the 75th anniversary of the Doolittle Raid on Japan. The flyover marked the end of a memorial service commemorating the raid.
- Active: 1947–1948, 1948–present
- Country: United States
- Branch: United States Air Force
- Role: Bombardment
- Part of: Air Force Global Strike Command; Eighth Air Force
- Garrison/HQ: Ellsworth Air Force Base, South Dakota
- Motto: Guardian of the North
- Aircraft: Rockwell B-1B Lancer
- Decorations: see "Lineage and Honors" section below

Commanders
- Current commander: Colonel Erick D. Lord
- Notable commanders: Brigadier General Richard E. Ellsworth; Brigadier General Clinton H. Winne Jr. Brigadier General Joseph C. Wilson Jr. Lieutenant General Robert C. Hinson

Insignia
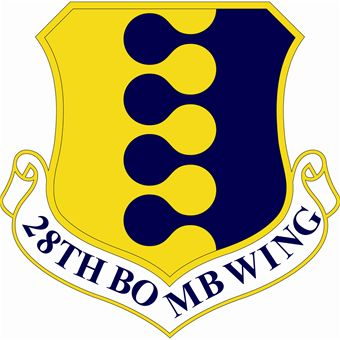
- 28th Bomb Wing emblem (approved 11 June 1952)

The 28th Bomb Wing (28 BW) is a United States Air Force unit assigned to the Eighth Air Force (8 AF) of the Air Force Global Strike Command (AFGSC) and is stationed at Ellsworth Air Force Base, South Dakota. The wing is also the "host unit" at Ellsworth AFB.

The wing is one of only two Rockwell B-1B Lancer strategic bomber wings in the United States Air Force, the other being the 7th Bomb Wing at Dyess Air Force Base, Texas.

Active for over 60 years, the 28th was a component wing of Strategic Air Command's deterrent force throughout the Cold War.

The 28th Bomb Wing has been commanded by Colonel Erick D. Lord since 25 July 2026. The previous commanders have been Col Gentry Boswell from 2015 to 2017, Col John Edwards from 2017 to 2019, Col David Doss from 2019 to 2021, and Col Joseph Sheffield from 2021 to 2023; its Command Chief Master Sergeant is CMSgt Adam Vizi.

== Units ==
- 28th Operations Group

28th Operations Support Squadron
34th Bomb Squadron
37th Bomb Squadron

- 28th Mission Support Group

28th Civil Engineering Squadron
28th Communications Squadron
28th Contracting Squadron
28th Logistics Readiness Squadron
28th Force Support Squadron
28th Security Forces Squadron

- 28th Maintenance Group

28th Aircraft Maintenance Squadron
28th Maintenance Squadron
28th Munitions Squadron
28th Maintenance Operations Squadron

- 28th Medical Group

28th Medical Operations Squadron
28th Medical Support Squadron

== Background of name ==
The motto "Guardian of the North" hails from the 28th Operations Group's World War II service in Alaska, the Aleutian Islands, and the Kuril Islands. The 28th Bomb Wing carries on the traditions of the 28th Operations Group.

Myth: The motto "Guardian of the North" is not related in any way to the wing's Cold War service with Boeing B-52 Stratofortress bombers. Although this motto seems to dovetail nicely with the idea of guarding the north (whether spearheading an attack over the North Pole, or defending against one) from the Soviets, this is definitely not the case.

== History ==
For related history and lineage, see 28th Operations Group

The 28th Bomb Wing, under various designations, has been assigned to Ellsworth Air Force Base, South Dakota for over 60 years. It is the longest assigned active-duty unit at a single base in the United States Air Force.

=== Cold War ===
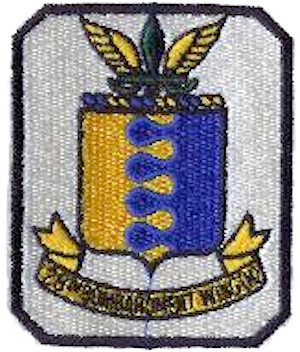
Cold War Emblem of the 28th Bombardment Wing

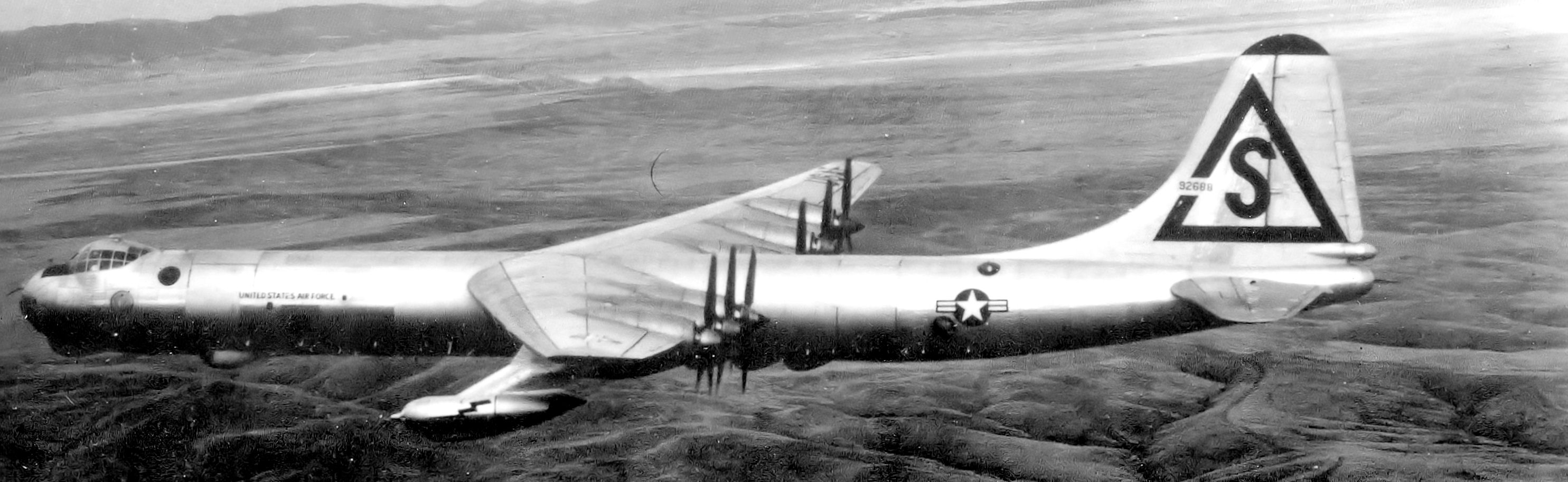
28th Strategic Reconnaissance Wing Convair RB-36D Peacemaker, AF Ser. No. 49-2688, with Tail Code Triangle-S, circa 1951

Established as the 28th Bombardment Wing, Very Heavy on 28 July 1947, the wing maintained proficiency in heavy bombardment from 1947 to 1948 and maintained proficiency in global bombardment, deploying tactical components or segments thereof as needed from 1948 to 1950.

In March 1953, an RB-36 and its entire crew of 23 crashed in Newfoundland while returning from a routine exercise in Europe. On 13 June 1953, President Dwight D. Eisenhower made a personal visit to dedicate the base in memory of Brig Gen Richard E. Ellsworth, commander of the 28th Strategic Reconnaissance Wing, who lost his life in that mishap.

Although the wing's aerial reconnaissance capability lasted until September 1958, by April 1955 the Air Force had already changed the wing back to its former status as the 28th Bombardment Wing, Heavy, under the 15th Air Force (later attached to the 3rd Air Division), which specialized almost exclusively in nuclear ordnance delivery. Headquarters Strategic Air Command (SAC) reassigned the 28 BMW from 8th Air Force back to 15th Air Force in October 1955. The wing also completed a deployment to Andersen Air Force Base, Guam, from April 1955 to July 1955.

Approximately one year later, SAC set plans in motion to replace the 28th's Convair B-36 Peacemakers with the new all-jet B-52 Stratofortress. The last B-36 left Ellsworth on 29 May 1957 and the first B-52 arrived sixteen days later. In 1958, all base units came under the command of the 821st Strategic Aerospace Division, headquartered at Ellsworth. On 26 September 1958, two B-52Ds from the wing set world speed records for heavy aircraft. One flew a 5,000 km closed course at an average speed of 597.695 mph, while the other flew a 10,000 km closed course at a speed of 560.705 mph.

The wing added aerial refueling to its mission in 1959 with the addition of the Boeing KC-135 Stratotanker and also began operating post-attack command and control system for Fifteenth Air Force in January 1965, maintaining this capability through a rear echelon during the absences of the remainder of the wing.

The wing also temporarily controlled the 850th Strategic Missile Squadron, a non-equipped Titan I missile squadron from December 1960 to December 1961 pending the later establishment of the 44th Strategic Missile Wing at Ellsworth.

In April 1966, B-52Ds of the wing, together with D series bombers of the 484th Bombardment Wing deployed to Andersen Air Force Base, Guam, replacing the B-52Fs that SAC had been deploying to Andersen for the Vietnam War since the previous year. The 28th's planes and other B-52Ds had been modified under a program called Big Belly, which increased the bombload of wing aircraft to 84 500 lb bombs or 42 750 lb bombs, from the 27 it could previously carry. From this point, the Big Belly B-52D became the SAC workhorse in Southeast Asia.

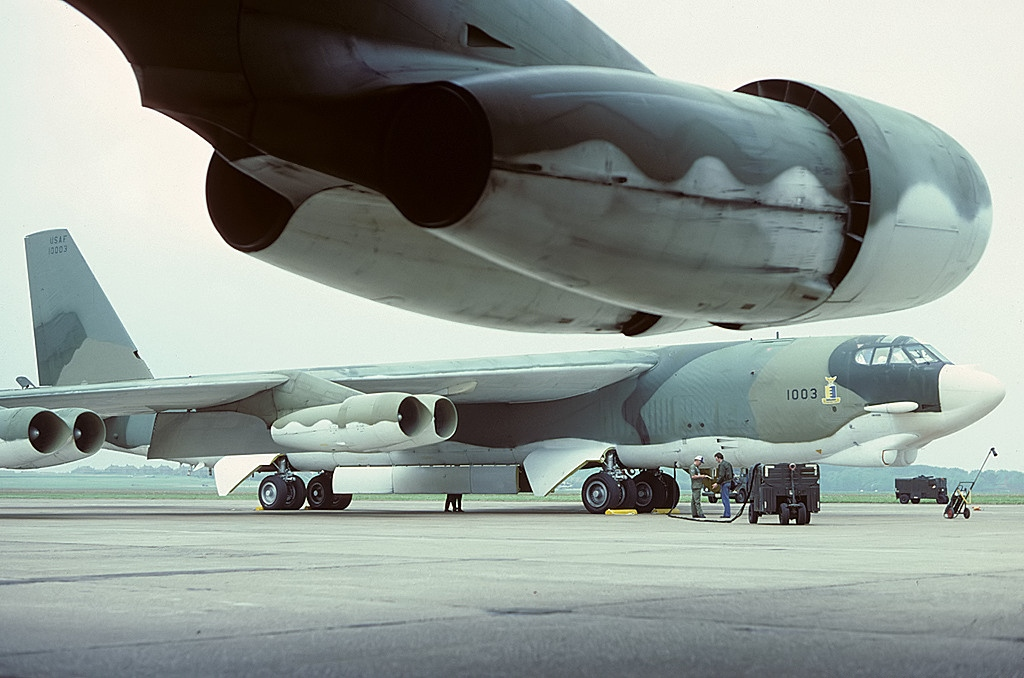
28th BMW B-52H circa 1979

Except for a small rear echelon left at Ellsworth, the wing's headquarters staff, aircraft and crews, and most support personnel were integrated into Operation Arc Light forces for combat in Southeast Asia, c. 9 March – c. 21 September 1966, c. 15 January – c. 19 July 1968, and c. 9 September 1969 – c. 18 March 1970. From April 1972 to October 1973 the wing also had most of its tactical aircraft and crews on loan to SAC organizations involved in combat operations, and the wing continued supporting Pacific forces with planes and crews into 1975.

In 1971, the wing converted from the B-52D to the B-52G, and converted again from B-52G to B-52H models in 1977. The B-52H mission expanded in 1984 to include sea reconnaissance, surveillance, and conventional operations from forward bases overseas, to include employment of the AGM-84 Harpoon missile. The wing also upgraded its tanker force to KC-135R variant in 1985 and 1986.

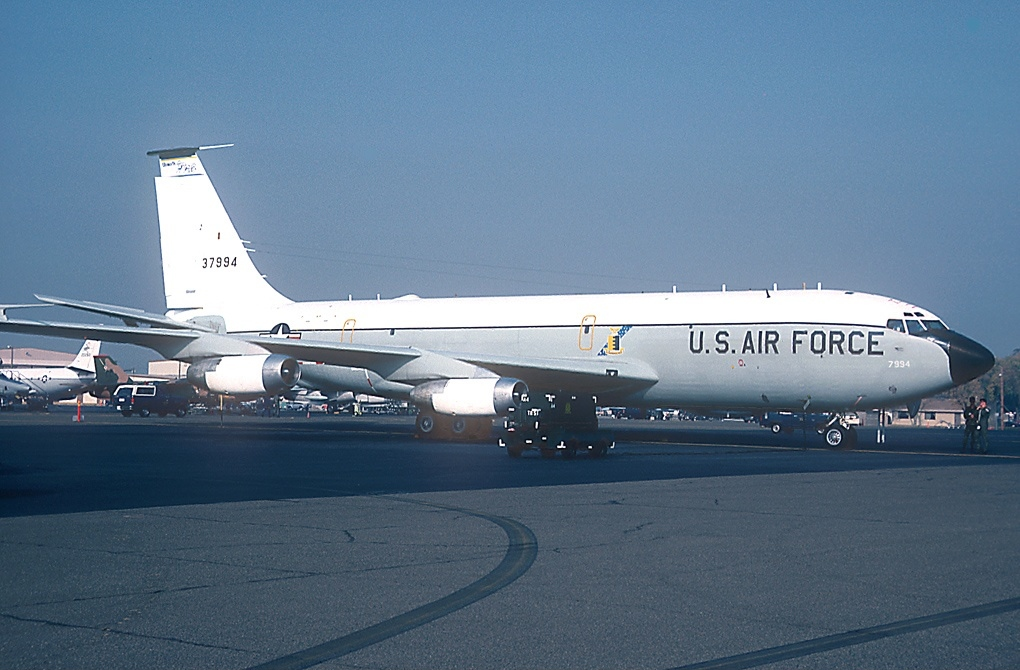
4th ACCS EC-135G Airborne Launch Control Center at Ellsworth AFB, SD

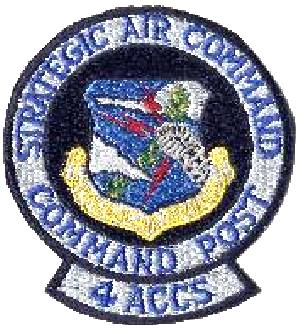
4th ACCS patch

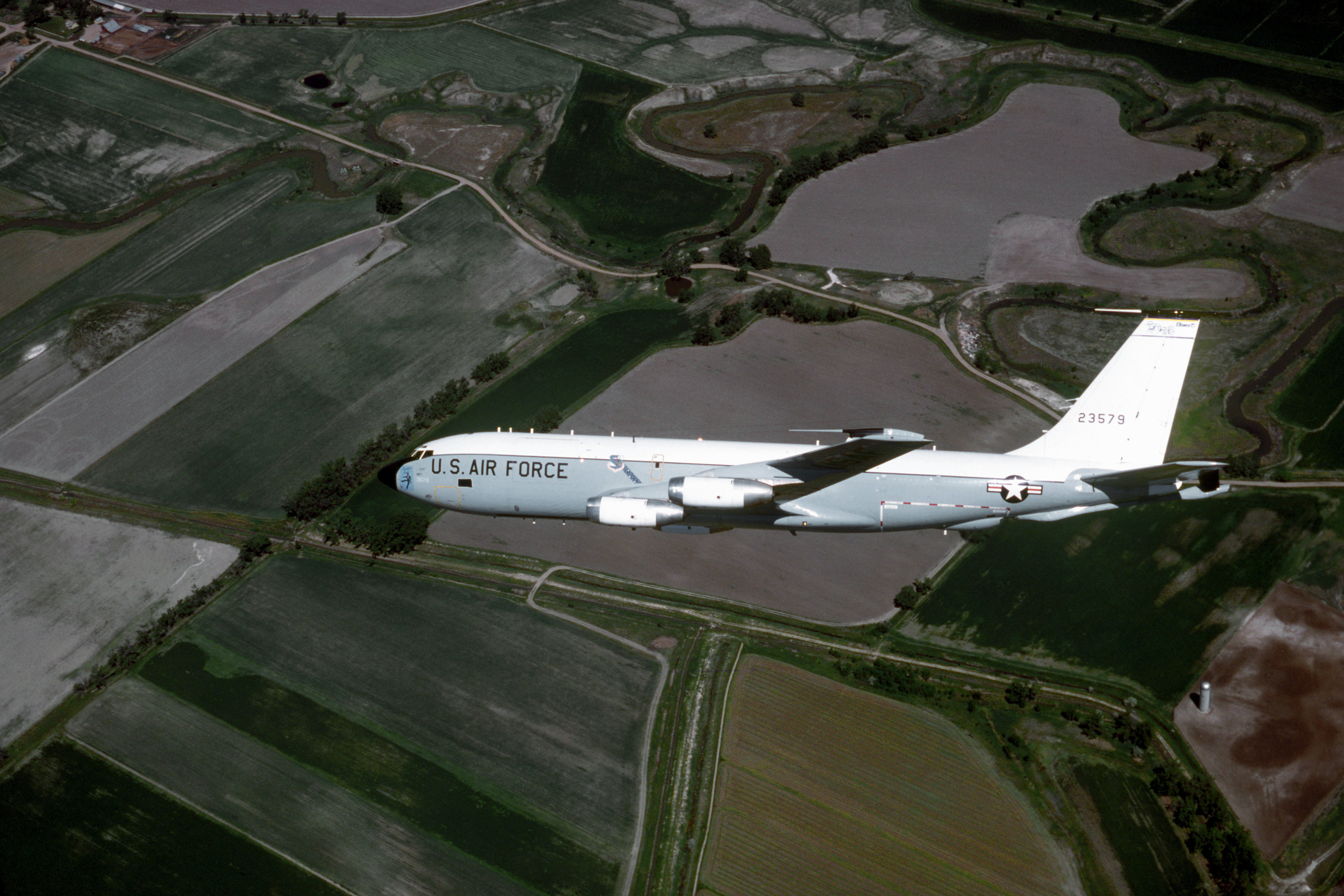
EC-135A Airborne Launch Control Center

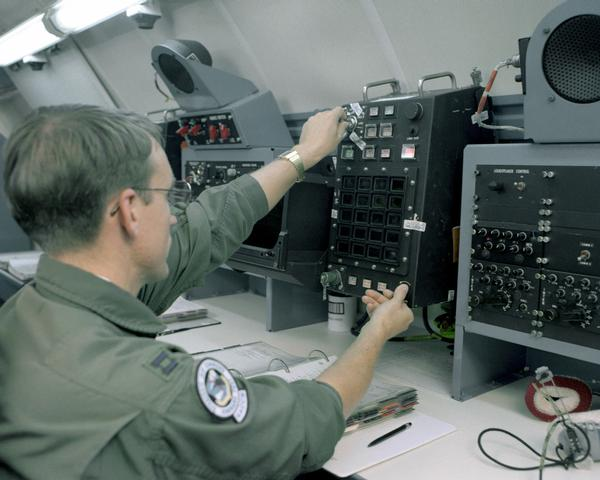
Airborne Launch Control System crew member

From 1 April 1970 to 30 September 1992, the 4th Airborne Command and Control Squadron (ACCS), part of the 28th BMW, provided airborne command post responsibilities with specially modified Boeing EC-135 airborne command post aircraft for Strategic Air Command as part of the Post Attack Command and Control System. The 4th ACCS was the workhorse of Airborne Launch Control System (ALCS) operations. Three dedicated Airborne Launch Control Centers (ALCC) (pronounced "Al-see"), designated ALCC No. 1, ALCC No. 2, and ALCC No. 3 were on ground alert around-the-clock providing ALCS coverage for five of the six Minuteman Intercontinental Ballistic Missile (ICBM) Wings. These dedicated ALCCs were mostly EC-135A aircraft but sometimes were EC-135C or EC-135G aircraft, depending on availability. ALCC No. 1 was on ground alert at Ellsworth AFB, SD and during a wartime scenario, its role would have been to take off and orbit between the Minuteman Wings at Ellsworth AFB, SD and F.E. Warren AFB, WY, providing ALCS assistance if needed. ALCCs No. 2 and No. 3 were routinely on forward deployed ground alert at Minot AFB, ND. During a wartime scenario, ALCC No. 3's role would have been to take off and orbit between the Minuteman ICBM Wings at Minot AFB, ND and Grand Forks AFB, ND, providing ALCS assistance if needed. ALCC No. 2's dedicated role was to take off and orbit near the Minuteman ICBM Wing at Malmstrom AFB, MT, providing ALCS assistance if needed. The 4th ACCS also maintained an EC-135C or EC-135G on ground alert at Ellsworth as the West Auxiliary Airborne Command Post (WESTAUXCP), which was a backup to SAC's Looking Glass Airborne Command Post (ABNCP), as well as a radio relay link between the Looking Glass and ALCCs when airborne. Although equipped with ALCS, the WESTAUXCP did not have a dedicated Minuteman ICBM wing to provide ALCS assistance to.

In 1986, the 28 BMW made extensive preparations to phase out the aging B-52 fleet and become the new home for the advanced B-1 Lancer. Contractors completed new unaccompanied enlisted dormitories in March, a new security police group headquarters in October, and gave Ellsworth's 13,497-foot runway a much-needed facelift. In addition, they completed new aircraft maintenance facilities for the complex new B-1B. In January 1987, the wing received the first of 35 B-1B bombers.

The 37 BS returned to operational duty with the 28 BW in January 1987, just in time to join the 77 BS in training on the new bombers. The first B-1B arrived on 21 January 1987. In July 1988 the 57th Air Division became the wing's new higher headquarters. In 1989 the wing's B-1Bs earned the Fairchild Trophy, Crumm Linebacker Trophy, Eaker Trophy, and the Omaha Trophy for superior bomber operations and the most outstanding wing in SAC. The wing also provided tanker support for Operation Just Cause, December 1989 – January 1990.

In July 1990 the Strategic Warfare Center became the latest of the wing's intermediate headquarters. Adding to its extensive combat experience, the wing deployed both tanker and airborne command post aircraft to the Gulf War from August 1990 – February 1991.

On 1 September 1991 SAC redesignated the 28th as the 28th Wing, and once again assigned it directly under Eighth Air Force, and as part of the new objective wing organization, reactivated the old 28 BG under the new name of the 28th Operations Group. The 28th Wing also regained host wing responsibilities for Ellsworth from the 44th Missile Wing.

=== Post Cold War era ===
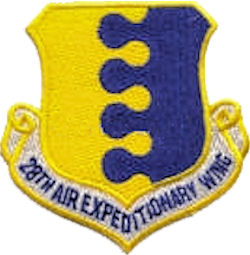
Emblem of the 28th Air Expeditionary Wing

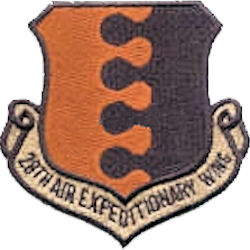
Emblem of the 28th Air Expeditionary Wing (Desert Motif)

With the end of the Cold War, on 28 September 1991 the Secretary of Defense ordered B-1Bs and tankers off alert. The 4 ACCS continued to maintain an alert crew until May 1992. On 1 June 1992, simultaneously, SAC inactivated, Air Combat Command activated, the 28th Wing changed names to the 28th Bomb Wing, and the 28 AREFS became a geographically separated unit assigned to Malmstrom Air Force Base, Montana. In September 1992 the 4 ACCS also inactivated, having effectively worked themselves out of a job by providing airborne command and control so faithfully for so long.

In 1993 the wing's B-1Bs were the first in ACC to transition from their former strategic role to an all-conventional mission. The 28th's operational squadrons could conceivably touch anywhere in the world to meet national defense needs. Ellsworth tested this concept in 1993 and early 1994 during such events as: "Team Spirit" (the first B-1Bs ever to land in South Korea); "Global Power" (various long-duration, round trip sorties flown from Ellsworth to bomb training ranges in another continent.); and "Bright Star" (the wing's second but the B-1Bs first visit to a major JCS exercise in Southwest Asia).

From June through December 1994, 28 BW B-1Bs participated in a Congressionally directed operational readiness assessment known locally as "Dakota Challenge." Towards the end of the exercise the wing deployed a squadron to Roswell, NM, to simulate flying from an austere location at wartime sortie rates. This test proved the B-1B to be a versatile weapon system. Excellent results were obtained. However, World Airpower Journal argued that '[i]t could be argued that the excellent results were meaningless, because they were so unrepresentative. Spare parts, equipment and people were brought in from the 7th and 384th Bomb Wings, at last bringing up the 28th up to 100% in all three respects. This was done at the expense of degrading the other two wings. It did however show what was possible, given funding and commitment.'. The journal favorably quoted General John M. Loh in this regard.

On 31 March 1995, the 77 BS—a unit that had served under the wing since 1948—inactivated. Its B-1Bs became part of ACC's reconstitution reserve. This action freed funds to allow the Air Force to develop new precision-guided munitions. The Air Force announced in early 1996 that the 77 BS would once again activate under the 28 BW on 1 April 1997. In November 1998, they received the first Block D upgraded B-1B in the USAF inventory. The Block D upgrade brings the capability for the B-1 to drop the Joint Direct Attack Munition, which is a global positioning system (GPS) guided munition. (These are the upgrades that were paid for with the funds that were freed during the 77 BS's inactivation).

One B-1B from the 28th Bomb Wing departed for Southwest Asia 18 December 1997 to supply additional bomber forces in the Middle East. The 7th Bomb Wing at Dyess Air Force Base also launched a B-1B 18 December. This brings the total number of B-1Bs in theater to six—three from Ellsworth and three from Dyess. B-1Bs from both bases saw their first combat action in air raids over Iraq 17 December 1997. Details on the number of B-1Bs used and battle damage assessment information has not been released; however, the missions were characterized as "very successful."

In December 1998, 28th deployed aircraft, which flew under the flag of the 28th Air Expeditionary Group in Operation Desert Fox, were the first B-1s to drop bombs on an enemy target.

In late March 2011, B-1 bombers from the 28th Bomb Wing were deployed on a mission to Libya to attack military targets in support of Operation Odyssey Dawn.

The Department of the Air Force announced in the spring of 2015 that effective 1 October 2015 the 28th, along with the 7th Bomb Wing at Dyess Air Force Base would be realigned under Air Force Global Strike Command (AFGSC), reuniting all the Air Force's bomber and strategic missiles under a single command for the first time since Strategic Air Command was inactivated 23 years earlier.

In February 2025, a majority of the 28th Bomb Wing, including all aircraft, relocated temporarily to Grand Forks Air Force Base to facilitate reconstruction of the primary runway at Ellsworth. This reconstruction was performed to support the upcoming arrival of B-21 Raider aircraft, and is expected to be completed in November 2025.

=== Operations and decorations ===
- Combat Operations: Except for a small rear echelon left at Ellsworth AFB, SD, the wing's headquarters staff, tactical aircraft and crews, and most support personnel were integrated into ARC LIGHT forces for combat in Southeast Asia, c. 9 March-c. 21 September 1966, c. 15 January-c. 19 July 1968, and c. 9 September 1969-c. 18 March 1970. From Apr 1972 to Oct 1973 the wing also had most of its tactical aircraft and crews on loan to SAC organizations involved in combat operations, and the wing continued supporting Pacific forces with planes and crews into 1975. In Nov 1997, deployed four B-1s and crews to Southwest Asia for a show of force against Iraq, the first real-world contingency use of the B-1 bomber. A year later (Nov 1998), the wing deployed three B-1s and crews to Southwest Asia for punitive attacks against Iraqi targets, the first combat use of the B-1. After terrorist attacks against the United States in Sep 2001, the wing deployed B-1 aircraft and crews to Diego Garcia, an island in the Indian Ocean, for bombing missions against enemy targets in Afghanistan.
- Campaigns: None
- Decorations: Air Force Outstanding Unit Awards with Combat "V" Device: 1 June 2001 – 31 May 2003; 20 September 2001 – 17 January 2002 (conferred). Air Force Outstanding Unit Awards: 1 September 1957 – 30 June 1958; 1 January-31 Dec 1966; 1 January-1 Mar 1968; 2 March-1 Jul 1968; 9 June-10 Jul 1972; 1 July 1976 – 30 June 1978; 1 July 1978 – 30 June 1980; 1 July 1981 – 30 June 1983; 1 July 1988 – 30 June 1990; 1 June-30 Nov 1994; 1 June 1997 – 31 May 1999; 1 June 2003 – 31 May 2005.

In 1989, won the Fairchild Trophy for excellence in bombing and navigation and the Omaha Trophy, presented to the outstanding wing in SAC.

== Lineage ==
- Designated as the 28th Bombardment Wing, Very Heavy on 28 July 1947

Organized on 15 August 1947
Redesignated 28th Bombardment Wing, Medium on 12 July 1948
Redesignated 28th Bombardment Wing, Heavy on 16 May 1949
Redesignated 28th Strategic Reconnaissance Wing on 1 April 1950
Redesignated 28th Strategic Reconnaissance Wing, Heavy on 16 July 1950
Redesignated 28th Bombardment Wing, Heavy on 1 October 1955
Redesignated 28th Wing on 1 September 1991
Redesignated 28th Bomb Wing on 1 June 1992.

=== Assignments ===
- Fifteenth Air Force, 15 August 1947
- Eighth Air Force, 1 April 1950
- Fifteenth Air Force, 1 April 1955 (attached to 3d Air Division, 14 April – 24 July 1955)
- 821st Air Division (later 821 Strategic Aerospace) Division), 1 January 1959
- 47th Air Division, 30 June 1971
- 4th Strategic Missile Division (later 4th Air Division), 15 January 1973
- 57th Air Division, 1 May 1982

- 4th Air Division, 23 January 1987
- 12th Air Division, 15 July 1988
- Strategic Warfare Center, 31 July 1990
- Eighth Air Force, 1 September 1991
- Eighth Air Force, 1 June 1992 (continued from 1 September 1991)
- Twelfth Air Force, 1 October 2002
- Eighth Air Force, 1 October 2015

=== Components ===
Groups

- 28th Bombardment Group (later 28th Strategic Reconnaissance Group, 28th Operations Group): 15 August 1947 – 16 June 1952; since 1 September 1991

Detached 19 July – 18 October 1948

Squadrons

- 4th Airborne Command and Control Squadron: 1 April 1970 – 1 September 1991
- 37th Bomb Squadron: 1 July 1977 – 1 October 1982; 1 January 1987 – 1 September 1991
- 77th Strategic Reconnaissance Squadron (later 77th Bombardment Squadron): attached 10 February 1951 – 15 June 1952, assigned 16 June 1952 – 1 September 1991 (detached c. 9 March-c. 21 September 1966, c. 15 January-c. 19 July 1968, c. 19 August 1969-c. 23 March 1970).
- 717th Strategic Reconnaissance Squadron (later 717th Bombardment Squadron): attached 10 February 1951 – 15 June 1952, assigned 16 June 1952 – 1 February 1960
- 718th Strategic Reconnaissance Squadron (later 718th Bombardment Squadron): attached 10 February 1951 – 15 June 1952, assigned 16 June 1952 – 20 February 1960
- 928th Air Refueling Squadron: 1 February 1959 – 1 October 1960
- 28th Air Refueling Squadron: 1 October 1960 – 1 September 1991 (detached c. 9 March-c. 21 September 1966, c. 15 January-c. 19 July 1968, c. 19 August 1969-c. 23 March 1970)
- 97th Air Refueling Squadron: 1 July 1962 – 15 March 1964
- 850th Strategic Missile Squadron: 1 December 1960 – 1 January 1962

=== Stations ===
- Rapid City Army Air Field (later Rapid City Air Force Base; Ellsworth Air Force Base), South Dakota, since 3 May 1947

28th Bombardment Group deployed at RAF Scampton, England, 19 July – 19 October 1948
77th Bombardment Squadron deployed to Andersen Air Force Base, Guam, c. 9 March – c. 21 September 1966, c. 15 January – c. 19 July 1968, and c. 9 September 1969 – c. 18 March 1970

=== Aircraft assigned ===
- Boeing B-29 Superfortress, 1946–1950
- Boeing RB-29 Superfortress, 1950
- Convair B-36D Peacemaker, 1949–1950; RB-36D (24), June 1950 – 1957 (Seven B-36Bs were converted to RB-36D); 10 later converted to GRB-36D (FICON). Several RB-36D aircraft temporarily assigned to 91st Strategic Reconnaissance Squadron for duty during Korean War.
- Boeing B-52 Stratofortress, 1957–1966, 1966–1968, 1968–1969, 1970–1986

B-52D, 1957–1971; B-52G, 1971–1977; B-52H, 1977–1986

- Boeing KC-135 Stratotanker, 1959–1966, 1966–1968, 1968–1969, 1970–1992
- Boeing EC-135A/C/G Airborne Launch Control Center and Looking Glass Airborne Command Post, 1967–1992
- Boeing KC-97 Stratofreighter, 1962–1964
- Rockwell B-1B Lancer, 1987–Present

References for commands and major units assigned, components and stations:

== See also ==
- List of B-52 Units of the United States Air Force
