= Richard E. Ellsworth =

United States Air Force general

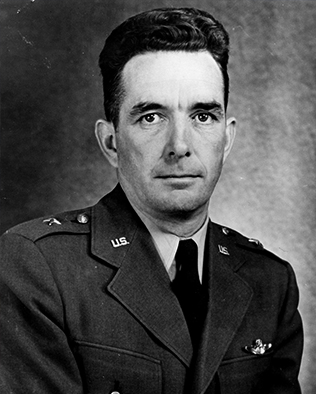
- Ellsworth circa 1952
- Born: July 18, 1911; Erie, Pennsylvania, US
- Died: March 18, 1953 (aged 41) near Burgoyne's Cove, Newfoundland, Canada
- Burial place: Black Hills National Cemetery
- Military career
- Allegiance: United States
- Branch: United States Air Force
- Service years: 1935–1953
- Rank: Brigadier general
- Commands: 28th Strategic Reconnaissance Wing; 308th Reconnaissance Group; 10th Weather Squadron
- Conflicts: World War II, Cold War
- Awards: Legion of Merit; Distinguished Flying Cross (2); Air Medals (3)

Brigadier General Richard Elmer Ellsworth (July 18, 1911 – March 18, 1953) was a United States Air Force commander during the early part of the Cold War. Ellsworth Air Force Base near Rapid City, South Dakota, is named in his honor.

== Early life ==
Born in Erie, Pennsylvania, Ellsworth joined the Pennsylvania National Guard in 1929. In 1931 he was accepted into the U.S. Military Academy (West Point) and after graduation in June 1935, he underwent pilot training as a second lieutenant at Randolph and Kelly fields in San Antonio, Texas. Ellsworth was assigned to squadron duties in October 1936 at Mitchel Field on Long Island in New York.

The army promoted him to first lieutenant in June 1938 and transferred him back to Kelly Field and later to the Sacramento Air Depot in California. He spent time studying meteorology at the California Institute of Technology in Pasadena, graduating with a master's degree. He received promotion to captain in October 1940, and by December 1941, Ellsworth was a major and by February 1942 a lieutenant colonel.

== World War II ==
In the spring of 1942, Ellsworth was reassigned to transport pilot duty in Alaska. Later that year, he was sent to study weather-related phenomena in the South Pacific, where he was promoted to full colonel in December. Beginning in July 1943, as commander of the Tenth Weather Region, he flew more than 400 combat missions in the China-Burma-India Theater, logging a total of 780 hours for the 10th and 14th Air Forces. For his heroics, he received battle stars for eight different campaigns, and further distinguished himself earning the Legion of Merit, two Distinguished Flying Crosses, three Air Medals, and even Chinese Air Force Wings.

== Cold War ==
After the war, Ellsworth returned stateside for reassignment as Chief of Operations and Training for the Air Weather Service in Washington. He later commanded the 308th Reconnaissance Group at Morrison Field, Florida as well as the Fairfield-Suisun Air Force Base in California. In July 1950, Ellsworth graduated from the Air War College at Maxwell Air Force Base in Alabama and was reassigned Chief of Plans for the 2nd Air Force at Barksdale Air Force Base, Louisiana. Colonel Ellsworth was assigned as the wing commander 28th Strategic Reconnaissance Wing at Rapid City Air Force Base in southwestern South Dakota in 1950. In September 1952, he was promoted to the rank of brigadier general.

Retired squadron maintenance officers at the base remember Ellsworth as an unusual, hands-on commander, who would sometimes assist mechanics working late into the night in efforts to ready aircraft.

In 1952, Ellsworth befriended Hollywood producer Herman Cohen during the filming of Battles of Chief Pontiac. The picture was shot on-location in western South Dakota, using Lakota Indians from a nearby reservation to portray the Native Americans. General Ellsworth allowed personnel from the base to act as extras in the film, portraying British and Hessian troops. Ellsworth sent out Air Force water trucks to assist the production crew. General Ellsworth's three sons were allowed to visit the set and meet the actors.

== Death ==
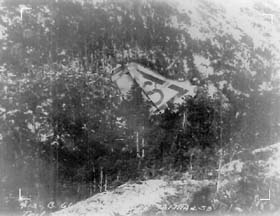
Official US Air Force accident incident photo of the March 18, 1953 bomber crash

Location in Newfoundland

On March 18, 1953, Ellsworth was co-piloting a Convair RB-36H Peacemaker bomber on a 25-hour journey as part of a simulated combat mission flying from Lajes, Azores back to the Rapid City base. As part of their exercise, the bomber's crew was observing radio silence and had switched off their radar guidance, flying via celestial navigation. They had planned to fly low over the ocean, steadily increasing to higher altitudes before reaching the mountainous countryside of Newfoundland.

Late into the night, the aircraft struck bad weather and went off course, reaching Newfoundland 90 minutes earlier than planned. At 4:10 am near Burgoyne's Cove, inland from Nut Cove, Trinity Bay, Newfoundland, with sleet, fog, freezing drizzle, and visibility estimated at less than 1/8-mile (200 m), the plane struck an 896-foot (273 m) hill at 800 feet (244 m) with a ground speed of 202 knots (374 km/h; 232 mph). The aircraft's propellers severed the tops of pine trees while the plane's left wing hit the ground, tore off, and spilled fuel. The rest of the plane impacted some thousand feet (300 m) further. The impact and subsequent fire from the plane's fuel tanks scorched an 8-foot-deep (2.4 m) trench in the countryside. Loggers on a nearby hill spotted the fireball and alerted rescuers, but all 23 on board were killed on impact. That same night, a Boeing SB-29 Superfortress search and rescue plane was sent out to assist in search efforts, but crashed two hundred miles (320 km) west in St. George's Bay, killing all 10 of its crewmembers.

In the aftermath of the crash, an accident investigation board recommended new procedures to scan more frequently for approaching high terrain and to climb to safer altitudes before approaching within 200 miles (320 km) of a water-land boundary. President Eisenhower personally went to the Rapid City base and renamed it Ellsworth Air Force Base, to honor the general on June 13.

Ellsworth, age 41, was buried in South Dakota, at Black Hills National Cemetery near Sturgis.

== Crash site ==
The remote crash site is one of only two B-36 crash sites still remaining (the other is in Alaska). Wreckage is strewn across 3/4-mile (1.2 km) of terrain, and remains today where it landed. The site is located about a forty-minute hike away from the nearest parking area. A nearby memorial features a propeller from the bomber, and a bronze plaque listing the names of the deceased crewmembers. The location of the crash site is at approximately (48.184352°N 53.664271°W)
