= 821st Strategic Aerospace Division =

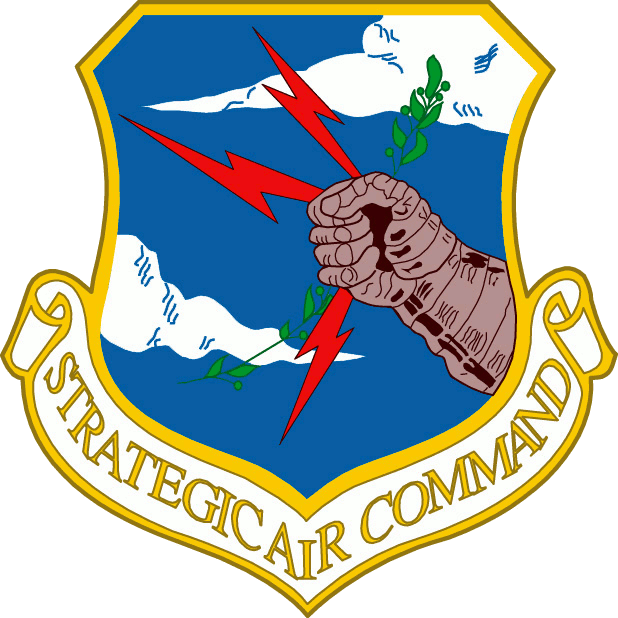
821st Strategic Aerospace Division

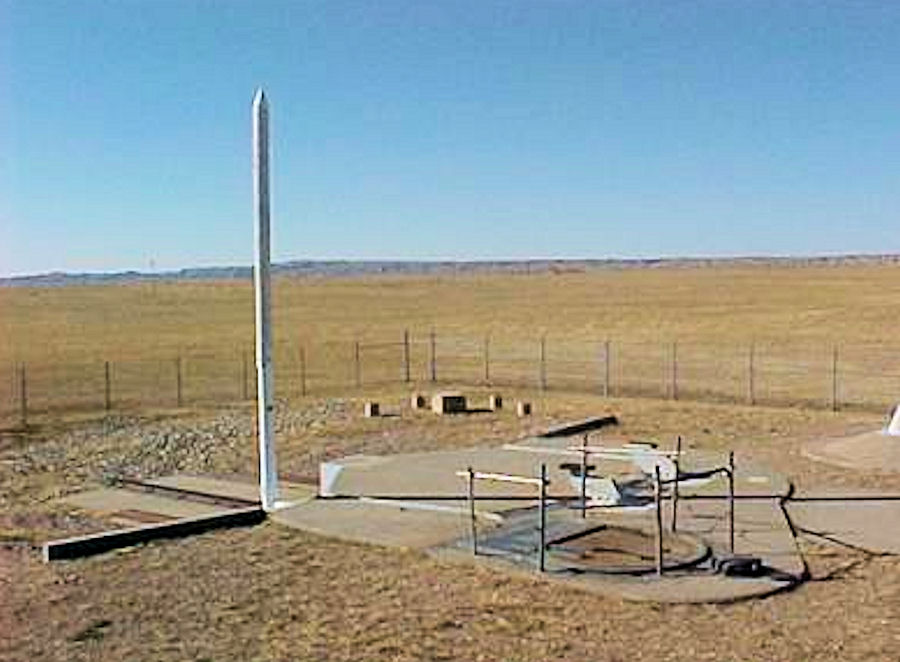
- Minuteman missile silo of the division's 44th Strategic Missile Wing
- Active: 1959–1971
- Country: United States
- Branch: United States Air Force
- Role: Command of strategic strike forces
- Part of: Strategic Air Command

Insignia
- 821st Strategic Aerospace Division emblem (approved 8 July 1959)

The 821st Strategic Aerospace Division is an inactive United States Air Force organization. Its last assignment was with Fifteenth Air Force at Ellsworth Air Force Base, South Dakota, where it was inactivated on 30 June 1971.

The division was activated as the 821st Air Division at Ellsworth in 1959 to command Boeing B-52 Stratofortress units of Strategic Air Command (SAC), which had been dispersed along the northern border of the United States to reduce their vulnerability to Soviet missile attacks.

In 1962, the 44th Strategic Missile Wing was activated at Ellsworth and assigned to the division along with a second Minuteman missile wing in Montana. At the same time, the B-52 wings formerly assigned to the division were transferred, except for the 28th Bombardment Wing at Ellsworth. The division's units assumed a heightened alert role during the Cuban Missile Crisis, including the first SAC LGM-30A Minuteman I to be put on alert.

The division continued at Ellsworth until June 1971, when SAC organized its divisions on a weapons system basis, and its bombardment and missile wings were reassigned to different divisions.

== History ==
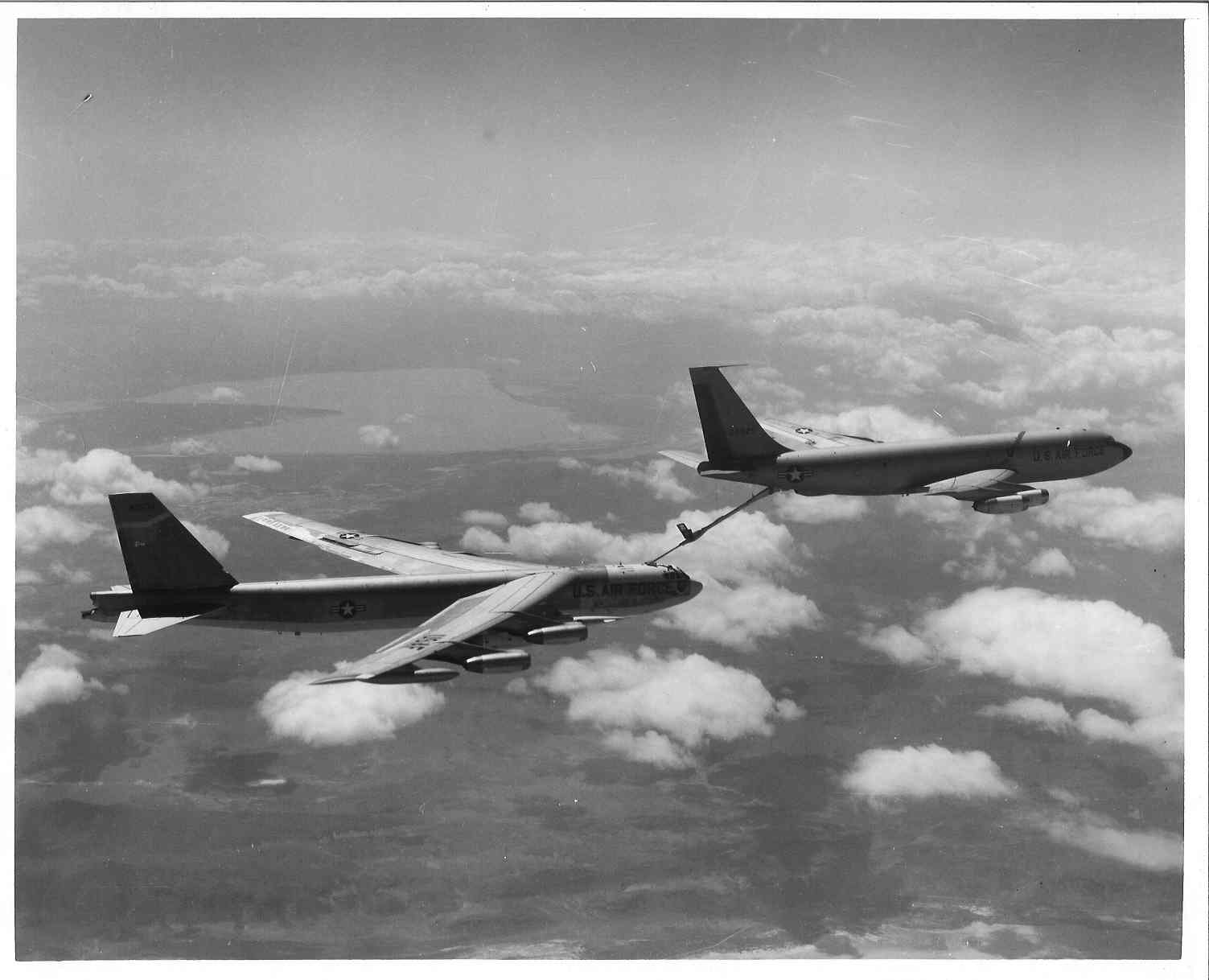
B-52G and KC-135A as flown by the division's strategic wings

Starting in 1957, the 28th Bombardment Wing at Ellsworth Air Force Base began to upgrade from the Convair B-36 Peacemaker to the Boeing B-52 Stratofortress. However, Strategic Air Command (SAC) was concerned that bases with large concentrations of the new jet bombers made attractive targets. SAC's response was to break up its B-52 wings and scatter their aircraft over a larger number of bases, thus making it more difficult for the Soviet Union to knock out the entire fleet with a surprise first strike. At the same time, the reduced number of interceptors available to Air Defense Command (ADC) due to attrition and closing production lines made ADC bases along the northern tier of states available for expansion to accommodate SAC heavy bombers and tankers. In 1958 SAC established strategic wings at Grand Forks Air Force Base, North Dakota, Minot Air Force Base, North Dakota, and Glasgow Air Force Base, Montana, all ADC bases. (Note: As the SAC role at these bases grew, each was eventually transferred from ADC to SAC. Mueller, pp. 202, 420) The 821st Air Division was activated at Ellsworth in January 1959 to command these new strategic wings and the 28th Wing at Ellsworth.

However, the establishment of wings did not immediately disperse the bomber force. It would be 1960 before the 28th Wing's 717th and 718th Bombardment Squadrons were transferred from Ellsworth to other bases. Although Boeing KC-135 Stratotankers were assigned earlier, Minot and Glasgow only received their bombers in 1961 and the Grand Forks wing only activated its bomber squadron in 1962. As their squadrons became combat ready, one third of each wing's aircraft were maintained on fifteen-minute alert, fully fueled, armed and ready for combat to reduce vulnerability to a Soviet missile strike. This was increased to half their aircraft in 1962.

In December 1960, the division added an intercontinental ballistic missile squadron to its strike forces, when the 850th Strategic Missile Squadron was activated and assigned to the 28th Bombardment Wing as an HGM-25A Titan I squadron. However, the squadron never became operational while assigned to the 28th.

1962 was a year of change for the division's responsibilities. On 1 January, the 44th Strategic Missile Wing was activated at Ellsworth and assigned to the 821st. The 850th Strategic Missile Squadron was assigned to the new wing. The same day, the division assumed support responsibility for Ellsworth through its 821st Combat Support Group. The following month, the division became the 821st Strategic Aerospace Division when SAC added the term "aerospace" to the names of its units with both bomber and missile strike elements.

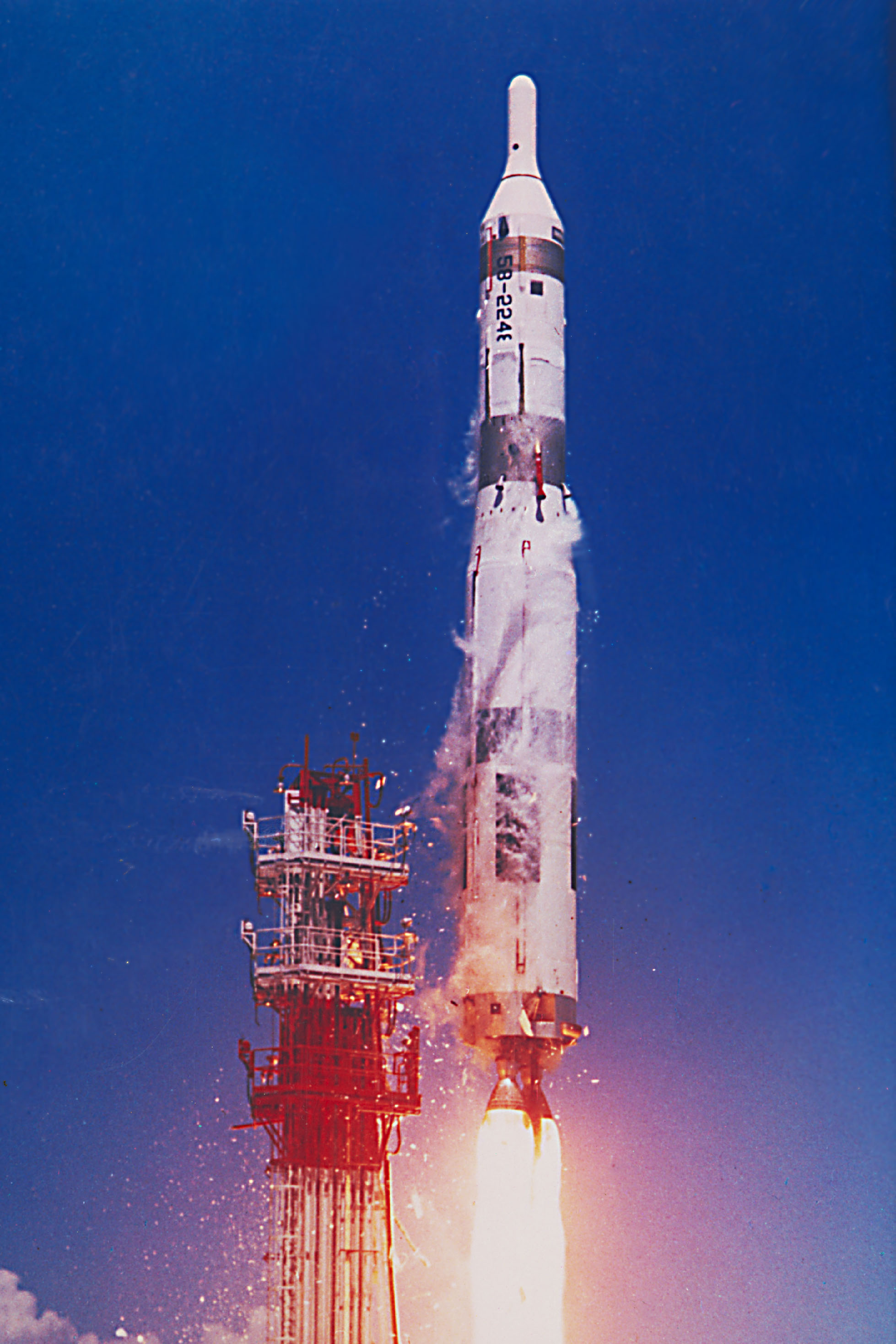
Titan I ICBM

Although the 44th wing was initially assigned Titan I missiles, it was designed as a LGM-30A Minuteman I wing and began to add Minuteman squadrons in the summer of 1962, although none became operational until 1963. In July, the division's responsibilities were realigned when the three strategic wings were reassigned to other SAC divisions and the 821st assumed command of a second Minuteman wing, the 341st Strategic Missile Wing at Malmstrom Air Force Base, Montana. On 23 July, the 341st's first Minuteman was placed in its silo.

On 23 October 1962, in response to the Cuban Missile Crisis, the 341st placed its first two Minuteman missiles on alert. (Note: Kipp states that the first two missiles did not go on alert until 27 October. Kipp. et al. pp. 72-74) The 341st was in the process of accepting their first flight of missiles from Air Force Systems Command. Eventually Malmstrom was able to place six missiles on alert for the duration of the crisis. These were the first and only SAC Minutemen to stand alert during the crisis. (Note: Systems Command also placed two Minuteman missiles at Vandenberg Air Force Base on alert. Kipp. et al. pp. 72-74) On 20 October SAC had directed its B-52 wings, including the 28th, to put two additional planes on alert. Two days later 1/8 of the division's B-52s were placed on airborne alert. Additional KC-135s were also placed on alert to replace the KC-135s devoted to maintaining the B-52 airborne alert. On 24 October SAC increased its readiness status to DEFCON 2, placing all its combat aircraft on alert. On 21 November SAC returned to normal airborne alert posture. and on 27 November SAC returned to normal ground alert posture.

The division lost the first Minuteman wing, the 341st, in 1964. In 1965, the 850th Strategic Missile Squadron was inactivated as the Titan I was withdrawn from service and its parent, the 44th Strategic Missile Wing, became an entirely Minuteman equipped unit. Offsetting the loss of a single missile squadron, the division gained the 90th Strategic Missile Wing at Glasgow Air Force Base. After these changes to the division's missile units, its composition remained stable until it was inactivated.

Between 1966 and 1970, the division's subordinate units loaned B-52 and KC-135 aircraft and crews to Strategic Air Command organizations in Southeast Asia in support of Operation Arc Light combat missions. The 821st conducted numerous staff assistance visits, and participated in tactical exercises such as Operation Chrome Dome.

The division was inactivated in 1971 as part of SAC's realignment of division headquarters on a functional basis. The 28th Bombardment Wing joined other bomber units in the 47th Air Division, while the 44th and 90th Strategic Missile Wings were reassigned to the 4th Strategic Missile Division.

== Lineage ==
- Established as 821 Air Division on 22 August 1958

Activated on 1 January 1959
Redesignated 821 Strategic Aerospace Division on 15 February 1962
Inactivated on 30 June 1971

=== Assignments ===
- Fifteenth Air Force, 1 January 1959 – 30 June 1971

=== Stations ===
- Ellsworth Air Force Base, South Dakota, 1 January 1959 – 30 June 1971

=== Components ===
Wings

- 90th Strategic Missile Wing: 2 July 1966 – 30 June 1971

F. E. Warren Air Force Base, Wyoming

- 91st Bombardment Wing: 1 September 1964 – 1 July 1966

Glasgow Air Force Base, Montana

- 44th Strategic Missile Wing: 1 January 1962 – 30 June 1971
- 341st Strategic Missile Wing: 1 July 1962 – 1 July 1964

Malmstrom Air Force Base, Montana

- 28th Bombardment Wing: 1 January 1959 – 30 June 1971
- 4133d Strategic Wing: 1 January 1959 – 1 July 1962

Grand Forks Air Force Base, North Dakota

- 4136th Strategic Wing: 1 January 1959 – 1 July 1962

Minot Air Force Base, North Dakota

- 4141st Strategic Wing: 1 July 1959 – 1 July 1962

Glasgow Air Force Base, Montana

Groups

- 821st Combat Support Group: 1 January 1962 – 30 June 1971
- 821st Medical Group: 1 January 1962 – 30 June 1971

=== Aircraft ===
- Boeing B-52 Stratofortress, 1959–1971
- Boeing KC-135 Stratotanker, 1959–1971
- Boeing KC-97 Stratofreighter, 1962–1964
- HGM-25A Titan I, 1962–1965
- LGM-30A Minuteman I, 1963–1971
- Boeing EC-135, 1965–1971

== See also ==
- List of United States Air Force air divisions
- List of USAF Bomb Wings and Wings assigned to Strategic Air Command
- List of missile wings of the United States Air Force
- List of USAF Strategic Wings assigned to the Strategic Air Command
- List of B-52 Units of the United States Air Force
