= Munde =

Munde may refer to:

- Munde (surname) (includes a list of people with the name)
- Mundé people, or Aikanã, an ethnic group of Brazil
- Mundé language, or Aikanã, a language of Brazil
- Saint Munde (died c. 962), Scottish abbot in Argyll, Scotland

== See also ==
- Monde (disambiguation)
- Munday (disambiguation)
