= Leon Vance =

American Medal of Honor recipient (1916–1944)

Leon Robert Vance Jr.
- Lt. Col Leon Vance, Medal of Honor recipient
- Born: August 11, 1916; Enid, Oklahoma, U.S.
- Died: July 26, 1944 (aged 27); Between Iceland and Newfoundland
- Burial place: Presumed dead; remains never recovered. Cenotaph in Waukomis Cemetery, Waukomis, Oklahoma and listed in the Tables of the Missing, Cambridge American Cemetery and Memorial, Coton, Cambridge, England
- Military career
- Allegiance: United States of America
- Branch: United States Army Air Forces
- Service years: 1939–1944
- Rank: Lieutenant Colonel
- Nicknames: "Bob", "Philo"
- Unit: 489th Bombardment Group
- Conflicts: World War II
- Awards: Medal of Honor; Purple Heart; Air Medal

Leon Robert Vance Jr. (August 11, 1916 – July 26, 1944) was a Medal of Honor recipient who served in the United States Army Air Forces during World War II.

== Early life and family ==
Leon Robert Vance Jr. was born and raised in Enid, Oklahoma. Vance attended Enid schools from first grade through high school. His father, Leon Robert Vance Sr., was a junior high school principal and also a civil aviation flight instructor, while his uncle had been an aviator in the Army Air Service who had been killed in France during World War I.

Vance was considered an above-average student and a great athlete. His father, as principal, thought of education as having great importance, and this spurred Vance Jr. to challenge himself by taking difficult courses in high school. He averaged a 94 percent in mathematics.

Vance attended the University of Oklahoma for two years, becoming a member of Phi Delta Theta. After his sophomore year, Vance entered the United States Military Academy on July 1, 1935, as a member of the Class of 1939. A 1999 article in U.S. News & World Report called Vance and his West Point classmates the "Warrior Class" because they were destined to fight in World War II, the Korean War, and the Vietnam War. In his First Class (senior) year, Vance was selected as a cadet sergeant in Company A of the Corps of Cadets. He graduated June 12, 1939, ranked 318th in order of general merit in a class of 456, and was commissioned as a second lieutenant of Infantry.

While training at Mitchel Field on Long Island, Vance met Garden City resident, Georgette Drury Brown. They married the day after his graduation from West Point and had a daughter, Sharon, born in 1942. Vance would later name his assigned aircraft The Sharon D. after his daughter.

== Military service ==
Vance requested pilot training and completed Basic School at the Spartan School of Aeronautics in Tulsa. On September 13, 1939, he was assigned to Randolph Field, Texas for Primary flight training, graduating the following March, and then to nearby Kelly Field for Advanced Flight School, where he graduated with Class 40C, earning his wings on June 21, 1940. Vance was also recommissioned as a first lieutenant, Air Corps. He served as an instructor until February 1941, when he was transferred to Goodfellow Army Air Field in San Angelo, Texas, and assigned to command the 49th School Squadron. He was at Goodfellow when the United States entered World War II in December 1941, was promoted to captain on April 6 and major on July 17, and remained in command of his basic flight training squadron until reassigned to Strother AAF, Kansas, in December 1942 as Director of Flying. While at Goodfellow, Horace Carswell and Jack Mathis (then an enlisted clerk), both of whom would subsequently receive the Medal of Honor posthumously, served in Vance's squadron. Vance was promoted to lieutenant colonel in September 1943, after little more than four years' service.

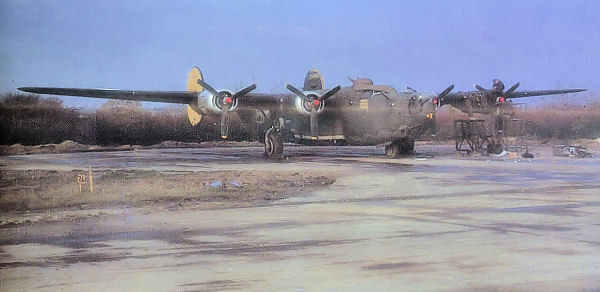
B-24H Liberator of the 489th Bomb Group on a hardstand at RAF Halesworth

After transition training to the Consolidated B-24 Liberator, Vance was assigned in December 1943 to the 489th Bombardment Group at Wendover AAF, Utah, as Deputy Group Commander. The group completed its training and prepared for overseas movement in April 1944, one of the last heavy bombardment groups to be assigned to the Eighth Air Force. The group was assigned to the 95th Combat Bombardment Wing of the 2nd Bomb Division and based at RAF Halesworth. Vance led the group on its first combat mission, bombing the Luftwaffe airfield at Oldenburg, Germany, on May 30, 1944.

== Medal of Honor mission ==
On June 5, 1944, Vance was assigned to lead the 489th BG on a diversionary attack against German coastal defenses near Wimereux, France, in the Pas-de-Calais, to support the anticipated D-Day landings. The group had lost six bombers on a mission to bomb Brétigny Airfield near Paris on June 2 (Vance did not participate), partly as a consequence of attempting to bomb visually in poor weather conditions. As a result, the lead aircraft of the 489th's formation on June 5 was a Pathfinder Force (PFF) "Mickey" B-24 detached from the 44th Bomb Group's 66th Bomb Squadron to enable the group to bomb through overcast using "blind bombing" tactics. Vance positioned himself on the bomber's flight deck, standing behind the aircraft commander and co-pilot.

After an 0900 takeoff, the group assembled its formation and climbed to its assigned 22,500 ft (6,900 m) altitude for the short flight to the French coast. The group approached the target area from the south but the bombs of the lead aircraft failed to release, and as a result none of the group bombed. Vance decided to make a second pass over the target rather than jettison the bombs into the English Channel, but as the formation approached the target a second time, it came under intense anti-aircraft fire ("flak"). The lead B-24 immediately sustained heavy battle damage. It continued the bomb run, however, and toggled its ordnance, but was further damaged by multiple flak bursts. In all, four crewmen were wounded, three of the four engines were disabled, and fuel lines ruptured in the fuselage. In addition, one of the aircraft's bombs again failed to release. Immediately after bomb release, shrapnel from a final burst killed the aircraft commander and wounded Vance, nearly severing his right foot, which became wedged in cockpit framework behind the copilot's seat. In the chaos that followed, comments on the interphone led Vance to believe that the crew's radio operator, wounded in the legs, was too seriously injured to be evacuated.

The B-24 lost altitude rapidly after the pilot was killed, but the wounded copilot regained controlled flight, preventing a stall by putting it into a steep glide to maintain airspeed. Despite shock from his own wound, Vance was able to assist the copilot in "feathering" the propellers, shutting down the over-strained fourth engine, and optimizing the glide of the crippled aircraft. The crew's "Mickey" operator, 2nd Lt. Bernard W. Bail, tried to dislodge Vance's pinned foot and applied a makeshift tourniquet.

When the B-24 reached the English coast, it was too damaged to land safely. Vance ordered the crew to "bail out," and after most had complied, took the controls and turned the aircraft back over the channel, where the remainder parachuted into the sea. He decided to attempt a water landing in the belief that the injured radio operator was still on the aircraft, even though B-24s were notoriously ill-suited for "ditching." From a semi-prone position over the power plant controls island between the crew seats, Vance flew the bomber mainly by use of ailerons and elevators, keeping a visual reference through the side window of the cockpit. Although the Liberator survived the ditching largely intact, its dorsal gun turret collapsed and pinned Vance inside the flooded cockpit as the bomber sank. An explosion blew him clear of the wreckage, however, and he was eventually able to inflate his Mae West. After searching for the radio operator, Vance swam towards shore. He was finally picked up by an RAF Air-Sea Rescue launch after fifty minutes.

== Death ==
Nearly two months later, after receiving medical treatment in the United Kingdom, Vance was sent back to the United States on a C-54 Skymaster transport for further treatment and possible fitting of a prosthetic foot. The C-54 with all aboard disappeared on July 26, 1944, and was presumed to have crashed into the Atlantic Ocean between Iceland and Newfoundland. The recommendation that he be awarded the Medal of Honor was confirmed in orders on January 4, 1945, but his widow requested that the awards ceremony be delayed until the medal could be presented to their daughter. On October 11, 1946, Major General James P. Hodges, commander of the 2nd Bomb Division when Vance was assigned to it, made the presentation to Sharon Vance, age 3½, at Enid Army Air Base.

== Awards and honors ==

Army Air Forces Pilot Badge
Medal of Honor
Purple Heart	Air Medal	American Defense Service Medal
American Campaign Medal	European–African–Middle Eastern Campaign Medal with two bronze campaign stars	World War II Victory Medal

Army Presidential Unit Citation

=== Medal of Honor citation ===
Vance, Leon Robert
Rank and organization
Lieutenant Colonel, Air Corps, 489th Bombardment Group (H)
Place and date
Over Wimereux. France, June 5, 1944
Entered service at
Garden City, New York
Born
August 11, 1916, Enid, Oklahoma
General Orders No. 1, January 4, 1945
Citation

For conspicuous gallantry and intrepidity above and beyond the call of duty on 5 June 1944, when he led a Heavy Bombardment Group, in an attack against defended enemy coastal positions in the vicinity of Wimereaux, France. Approaching the target, his aircraft was hit repeatedly by antiaircraft fire which seriously crippled the ship, killed the pilot, and wounded several members of the crew, including Lt. Col. Vance, whose right foot was practically severed. In spite of his injury, and with 3 engines lost to the flak, he led his formation over the target, bombing it successfully. After applying a tourniquet to his leg with the aid of the radar operator, Lt. Col. Vance, realizing that the ship was approaching a stall altitude with the 1 remaining engine failing, struggled to a semi-upright position beside the copilot and took over control of the ship. Cutting the power and feathering the last engine he put the aircraft in glide sufficiently steep to maintain his airspeed. Gradually losing altitude, he at last reached the English coast, whereupon he ordered all members of the crew to bail out as he knew they would all safely make land. But he received a message over the interphone system which led him to believe 1 of the crew members was unable to jump due to injuries; so he made the decision to ditch the ship in the channel, thereby giving this man a chance for life. To add further to the danger of ditching the ship in his crippled condition, there was a 500-pound bomb hung up in the bomb bay. Unable to climb into the seat vacated by the copilot, since his foot, hanging on to his leg by a few tendons, had become lodged behind the copilot's seat, he nevertheless made a successful ditching while lying on the floor using only aileron and elevators for control and the side window of the cockpit for visual reference. On coming to rest in the water the aircraft commenced to sink rapidly with Lt. Col. Vance pinned in the cockpit by the upper turret which had crashed in during the landing. As it was settling beneath the waves an explosion occurred which threw Lt. Col. Vance clear of the wreckage. After clinging to a piece of floating wreckage until he could muster enough strength to inflate his life vest he began searching for the crewmember whom he believed to be aboard. Failing to find anyone he began swimming and was found approximately 50 minutes later by an Air-Sea Rescue craft. By his extraordinary flying skill and gallant leadership, despite his grave injury, Lt. Col. Vance led his formation to a successful bombing of the assigned target and returned the crew to a point where they could bail out with safety. His gallant and valorous decision to ditch the aircraft in order to give the crewmember he believed to be aboard a chance for life exemplifies the highest traditions of the U.S. Armed Forces.

=== Other honors ===
The airbase in his hometown of Enid, Oklahoma, was renamed Vance Air Force Base in his honor on July 9, 1949. He was further honored when Gate 40 of Tinker Air Force Base, Oklahoma, was renamed "Vance Gate" on May 9, 1997.

== See also ==
- List of Medal of Honor recipients
