= 847th Bombardment Squadron =

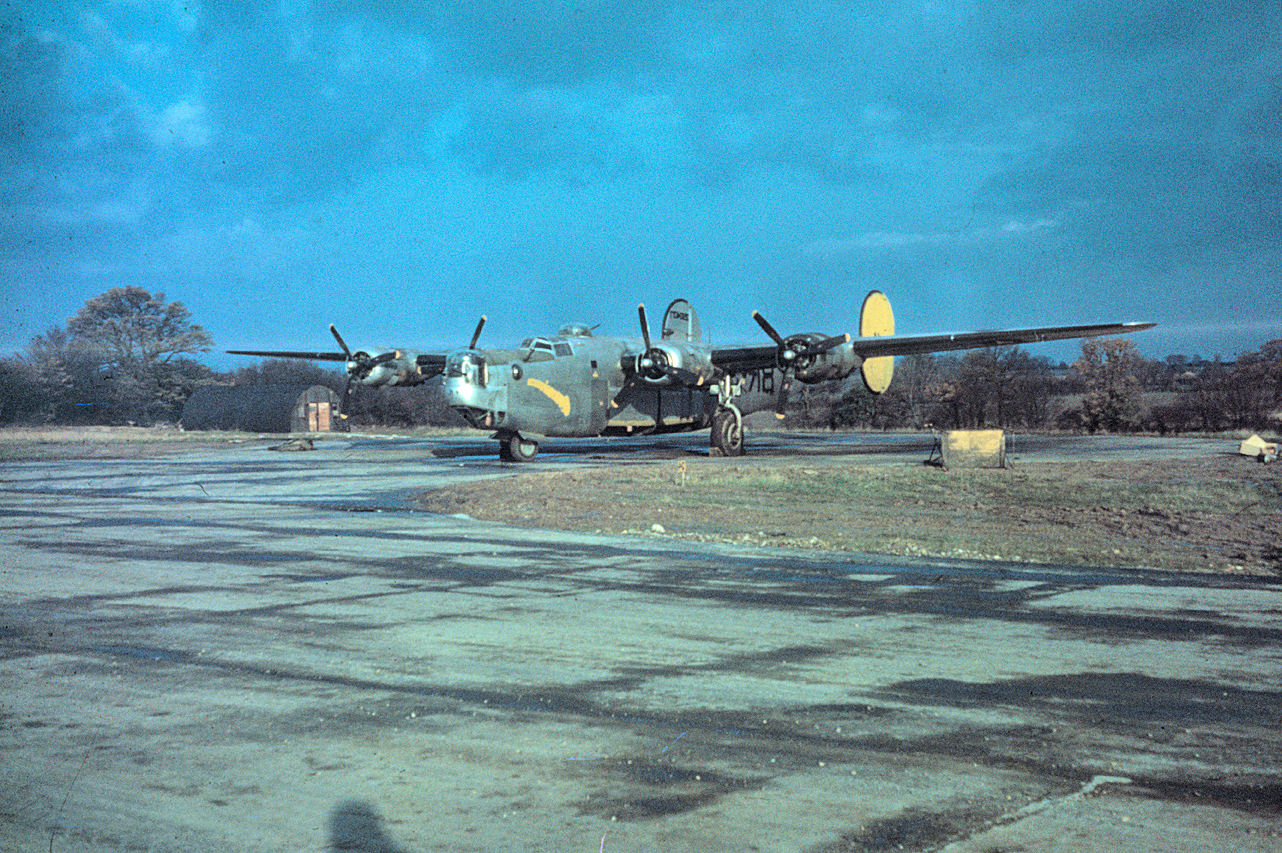
- 489th Bombardment Group B-24 Liberator
- Active: 1942-1945
- Country: United States
- Branch: United States Air Force
- Role: Antisubmarine Warfare, Bombardment
- Engagements: Antisubmarine Campaign; European Theater of Operations

Insignia
- Fuselage code: S4

The 847th Bombardment Squadron is a former United States Army Air Forces unit that was originally activated as the 421st Bombardment Squadron. Its last assignment was with the 489th Bombardment Group at Great Bend Army Air Field, Kansas where it was inactivated on 28 March 1945. As the 20th Antisubmarine Squadron, the squadron performed antisubmarine patrols in 1942 and 1943. After reforming as a heavy bomber squadron, it engaged in the strategic bombing campaign against Germany in the European Theater of Operations until returning to the United States in late 1944. The squadron was inactivated while its parent group was training as a very heavy bombardment unit.

== History ==
=== Activation and antisubmarine warfare ===
The squadron was originally constituted as the 32d Reconnaissance Squadron, but was redesignated the 421st Bombardment Squadron before being activated in mid-1942 as one of the 304th Bombardment Group's four Boeing B-17 Flying Fortress heavy bomber squadrons. It was initially part of Second Air Force for training, however it also flew antisubmarine patrols over the Pacific Northwest coastline during the fall of 1942. The squadron was renamed the 20th Antisubmarine Squadron and moved to Newfoundland in late 1942 where it continued flying antisubmarine missions over the Northeast coastline from Newfoundland and Long Island, New York during 1943 with Army Air Forces Antisubmarine Command.

In July 1943, the AAF and Navy reached an agreement to transfer the coastal antisubmarine mission to the Navy. This mission transfer also included an exchange of AAF long-range bombers equipped for antisubmarine warfare for Navy Consolidated B-24 Liberators without such equipment.

=== Combat in Europe ===
In October 1943, the squadron was redesignated the 847th Bombardment Squadron and moved to Wyoming where its personnel formed the cadre for the newly forming 489th Bombardment Group. There the unit re-equipped with Consolidated B-24 Liberators and once again trained with Second Air Force. The squadron completed combat training and departed Wendover Field for overseas on 3 April 1944. The air echelon flew to the United Kingdom via the southern ferry route along the northern coastline of South America and across the Atlantic to Africa before heading north to England. The ground echelon sailed from Boston on board the USS Wakefield on 13 April 1944, reaching Liverpool on 21 April. The squadron arrived at RAF Halesworth, England in April 1944, where it became part of Eighth Air Force.

The squadron entered combat on 30 May 1944 with an attack on Oldenburg, Germany. It then concentrated on targets in France to prepare for Operation Overlord, the invasion of Normandy. The 847th supported the landings on 6 June 1944, and afterward bombed coastal defenses, airfields, bridges, railroads, and V-1 flying bomb and V-2 rocket launch sites (Operation Crossbow) in the campaign for France. It participated in the saturation bombing of German lines just before Operation Cobra, the breakthrough at Saint-Lô in July.

The 847th began flying strategic bombing missions to Germany in July, and engaged primarily in bombing strategic targets such as factories, oil refineries and storage areas, marshalling yards, and airfields in Ludwigshafen, Magdeburg, Brunswick, Saarbrücken, and other cities until November 1944. The squadron dropped food to liberated French and to Allied forces in France during August and September, and carried food and ammunition to the Netherlands later in September. For these missions, a loadmaster from IX Troop Carrier Command directed the drops from the bombers. On other missions, squadron aircraft flew into Orleans/Bricy Airfield to deliver supplies.

=== Redeployment for the Pacific ===
The squadron was part of the first group in Eighth Air Force selected for redeployment to the Pacific theater and became non-operational on 14 November 1944 and most of its B-24s were assigned to other groups in England. It was relieved of assignment to the theater on 29 November 1944, and returned to the United States.

The 847th Squadron returned to Bradley Field Connecticut at the end of December 1944, where most returning personnel were reassigned to other units while the squadron moved to Lincoln Army Air Field, Nebraska. At Lincoln it became part of Second Air Force for the third time. On 22 January 1945, the squadron's personnel were informed that previous plans for refresher training had been cancelled and instead the squadron and its associated 369th Air Service Group were retrained as Boeing B-29 Superfortress combat and support units. However Second Air Force did not receive redesignation orders for the group until 17 March, until which time they were compelled to maintain duplicate rosters and tables of organization, one for a heavy bombardment group of four squadrons (which included the 847th), and one for a very heavy bombardment group of three squadrons (which did not). With the new orders in hand, the squadron was inactivated on 28 March.

== Lineage ==
- Constituted as the 32d Reconnaissance Squadron (Heavy) on 28 January 1942 (Note: This squadron is not related to a 32d Reconnaissance Squadron (Fighter) which was activated as the 32d Observation Squadron on 1 April 1943 at DeRidder Army Air Base Louisiana and disbanded on 1 September 1943 without ever becoming operational. Maurer, Combat Squadrons, p. 159.)

Redesignated: 421st Bombardment Squadron (Heavy) on 22 April 1942
Activated on 15 July 1942
Redesignated: 20th Antisubmarine Squadron (Heavy) On 8 February 1943
Redesignated: 847th Bombardment Squadron, Heavy on 5 October 1943
Inactivated on 28 March 1945

=== Assignments ===
- 304th Bombardment Group, 15 July 1942
- Newfoundland Base Command, 6 November 1942
- Army Air Forces Antisubmarine Command, 8 February 1943
- 489th Bombardment Group, 13 October 1943 – 28 March 1945

=== Stations ===
- Salt Lake City Army Air Base, Utah, 15 July 1942
- Geiger Field, Washington, 15 September 1942
- Ephrata Army Air Base, Washington, 1 October 1942
- Torbay Airfield, Newfoundland, 29 October 1942
- Mitchel Field, New York, 25 June 1943
- Casper Army Air Field, Wyoming, 13 October 1943
- Wendover Field, Utah, 1 October 1943 – 3 April 1944
- RAF Halesworth (AAF 365), England, c. 22 April – November 1944
- Bradley Field, Connecticut, 13 December 1944
- Lincoln Army Air Field, Nebraska, 17 December 1944
- Great Bend Army Air Field, Kansas, 23 February 1945 – 28 March 1945

=== Aircraft ===
- Douglas DB-7 Boston, 1942–1943
- Douglas A-20 Havoc, 1942–1943
- Grumman OA-12 Duck, 1942–1943
- Boeing B-17 Flying Fortress, 1942–1943
- Consolidated B-24 Liberator, 1943–1944
- Boeing B-29 Superfortress, 1945

=== Campaigns ===
Campaign Streamer	Campaign	Dates	Notes
	Antisubmarine	15 September 1942 – 25 June 1943	421st Bombardment Squadron (later 20th Antisubmarine Squadron)
	Air Offensive, Europe	c. 22 April 1943 – 5 June 1944	847th Bombardment Squadron
	Normandy	6 June 1944 – 24 July 1944	847th Bombardment Squadron
	Northern France	25 July 1944 – 14 September 1944	847th Bombardment Squadron
	Rhineland	15 September 1944-November 1944	847th Bombardment Squadron

== See also ==
- B-17 Flying Fortress units of the United States Army Air Forces
- B-24 Liberator units of the United States Army Air Forces
- List of B-29 units of the United States Air Force
- List of Douglas A-20 Havoc operators
