= 846th Bombardment Squadron =

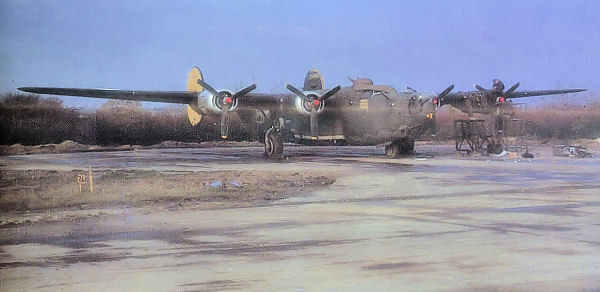
- 846th Squadron B-24 Liberator (Note: Aircraft is Ford Motors built Consolidated B-24H-20-FO Liberator, serial 42-94860, Appassianato. Taken in late 1944 after tail markings had changed to all yellow.)
- Active: 1943-1945
- Country: United States
- Branch: United States Army Air Forces
- Role: heavy bomber
- Engagements: European Theater of Operations

Insignia
- Fuselage code: 8R

The 846th Bombardment Squadron is an inactive United States Air Force unit. It was assigned to the 489th Bombardment Group, flying Consolidated B-24 Liberators. After training in the United States, it moved to England and engaged in combat in the strategic bombing campaign against Germany until V-E Day. It returned to United States in 1945 and began training with the Boeing B-29 Superfortress, but was inactivated at March Field, California on 17 October 1945.

== History ==
=== Training in the United States ===
The 846th Bombardment Squadron was activated as a Consolidated B-24 Liberator heavy bomber squadron on 1 October 1943 at Wendover Field, Utah, one of the four original squadrons of the 489th Bombardment Group. The squadron completed combat training and departed Wendover on 3 April 1944. The air echelon flew to the United Kingdom via the southern ferry route along the northern coastline of South America and across the Atlantic to Africa before heading north to England. The ground echelon sailed from Boston on board the USS Wakefield on 13 April 1944, reaching Liverpool on 21 April. The squadron arrived at RAF Halesworth, England, in April 1944, where it became part of Eighth Air Force.

=== Combat in Europe ===
The squadron entered combat on 30 May 1944 with an attack on Oldenburg, Germany. It then concentrated on striking targets in France to prepare for Operation Overlord, the invasion of Normandy. The 846th supported the landings on 6 June 1944, and afterward bombed coastal defenses, airfields, bridges, railroads, and V-1 flying bomb and V-2 rocket launch sites (Operation Crossbow) in the campaign for France. It participated in the saturation bombing of German lines just before Operation Cobra, the breakthrough at Saint-Lô in July.

The 846th began flying strategic bombing missions to Germany in July, and engaged primarily in bombing strategic targets such as factories, oil refineries and storage areas, marshalling yards, and airfields in Ludwigshafen, Magdeburg, Brunswick, Saarbrücken, and other cities until November 1944. The squadron dropped food to liberated French and to Allied forces in France during August and September, and carried food and ammunition to the Netherlands later in September. For these missions, a loadmaster from IX Troop Carrier Command directed the drops from the bombers. On other missions, squadron aircraft flew into Orleans/Bricy Airfield to deliver supplies.

=== Redeployment for the Pacific ===
It was part of the first group in Eighth Air Force selected for redeployment to the Pacific theater and became non-operational on 14 November 1944 and most of its B-24s were assigned to other groups in England. It was relieved of assignment to the theater on 29 November 1944, and returned to the United States.

The 846th Squadron returned to Bradley Field Connecticut at the end of December 1944, where most returning personnel were reassigned to other units while the squadron moved to Lincoln Army Air Field, Nebraska. At Lincoln it again became part of Second Air Force. On 22 January 1945, the squadron's personnel were informed that previous plans for refresher training had been cancelled and instead the squadron and its associated 369th Air Service Group were retrained as Boeing B-29 Superfortress combat and support units. However Second Air Force did not receive redesignation orders for the group until 17 March, until which time they were compelled to maintain duplicate rosters and tables of organization, one for a heavy bombardment group of four squadrons, and one for a very heavy bombardment group of three squadrons. The readiness date for the group air echelon was set back from 1 March to 1 August 1945. The squadron moved to Great Bend Army Air Field, Kansas in mid-February to re-equip with the B-29, and was redesignated the 846th Bombardment Squadron, Very Heavy in March.

The group was alerted for movement overseas in the summer of 1945, but with the Japanese surrender, the squadron was inactivated on 17 October 1945.

== Lineage ==
- Constituted 846th Bombardment Squadron, Heavy on 14 September 1943

Activated on 1 October 1943
Redesignated 846th Bombardment Squadron, Very Heavy on 17 March 1945
Inactivated on 17 October 1945

=== Assignments ===
- 489th Bombardment Group, 1 October 1943 – 17 October 1945

=== Stations ===
- Wendover Field, Utah, 1 October 1943 – 3 April 1944
- RAF Halesworth (AAF 365), England, c. 22 April–November 1944
- Bradley Field, Connecticut, 13 December 1944
- Lincoln Army Air Field, Nebraska, 17 December 1944
- Great Bend Army Air Field, Kansas 23 February 1945
- Davis-Monthan Field, Arizona, 3 April 1945
- Fairmont Army Air Field, Nebraska 25 July 1945
- Fort Lawton, Washington 23 August 1945
- March Field, California 2 September–17 October 1945

=== Aircraft ===
- Consolidated B-24 Liberator, 1943-1944
- Boeing B-29 Superfortress, 1945

=== Campaigns ===
Campaign Streamer	Campaign	Dates	Notes
	Air Offensive, Europe	c. 22 April 1943-5 June 1944	846th Bombardment Squadron
	Normandy	6 June 1944-24 July 1944	846th Bombardment Squadron
	Northern France	25 July 1944-14 September 1944	846th Bombardment Squadron
	Rhineland	15 September 1944-November 1944	846th Bombardment Squadron

== See also ==
- B-24 Liberator units of the United States Army Air Forces
- List of B-29 Superfortress operators
