= Munday =

Munday may refer to:

== People ==
- Munday (Hampshire cricketer), 18th-century English cricketer
- Anthony Munday (1560–1633), English dramatist
- Don Munday (1890–1950), Canadian explorer, naturalist and mountaineer
- David Mundy (born 1986), Australian rules footballer
- Diane Munday (1931–2026), British political activist
- Dorian Carl Munday (born 1941) British composer
- Herbert Munday (1876–1961), English footballer
- Jim Munday (1917–1971), Australian rules footballer
- John Mundy (composer) (c.1550–1630), English Renaissance composer
- Kade Munday (born 1983), Australian cricketer
- Michael Munday (born 1984), English cricketer
- Mickey Munday, the last surviving member of the Miami-based drug gang called the "Cocaine Cowboys"
- Pat Munday, American environmentalist and writer
- Phyllis Munday (1894–1990), Canadian mountaineer
- Richard Burnard Munday (1896-1932), World War I flying ace
- Richard Munday (c.1685–1739), colonial American architect and builder

== Places ==
- Munday, Texas, USA
- Munday, West Virginia, USA
- Munday Island, Tasmania, Australia

== Other uses ==
- 15576 Munday, asteroid

== See also ==
- Monday
- Mundy (disambiguation)
