= 489th Bomb Group =

US Air Force Reserve unit

489th Bomb Group

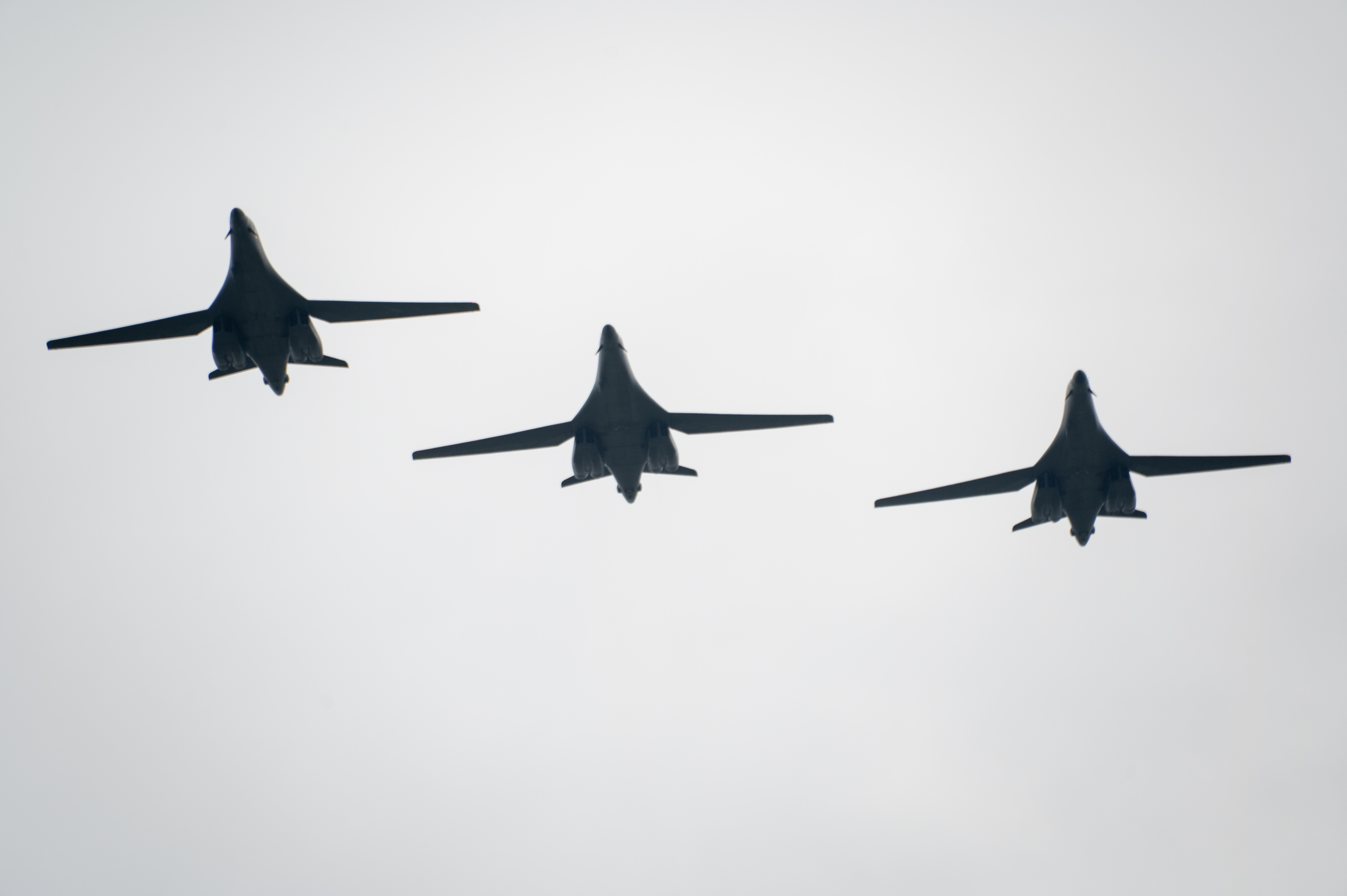
- Three Rockwell B-1B Lancers fly over Ørland Main Air Station, Norway (Note: The bombers are from the 345th Expeditionary Bomb Squadron deployed in support of Bomber Task Force Europe and included reserve airman from the 489th Bomb Group. Taken 9 August 2025.)
- Active: 1943–1945; 2015–present
- Country: United States
- Branch: United States Air Force
- Role: Bombardment
- Part of: Air Force Reserve Command
- Garrison/HQ: Dyess Air Force Base
- Mottos: Ex Tenebris Lux Veritatis (Latin for 'Out of Darkness, the Light of Truth')
- Engagements: European Theater of Operations

Commanders
- Current commander: Col. Christopher G. Hawn (as of 13 July 2019)

Insignia
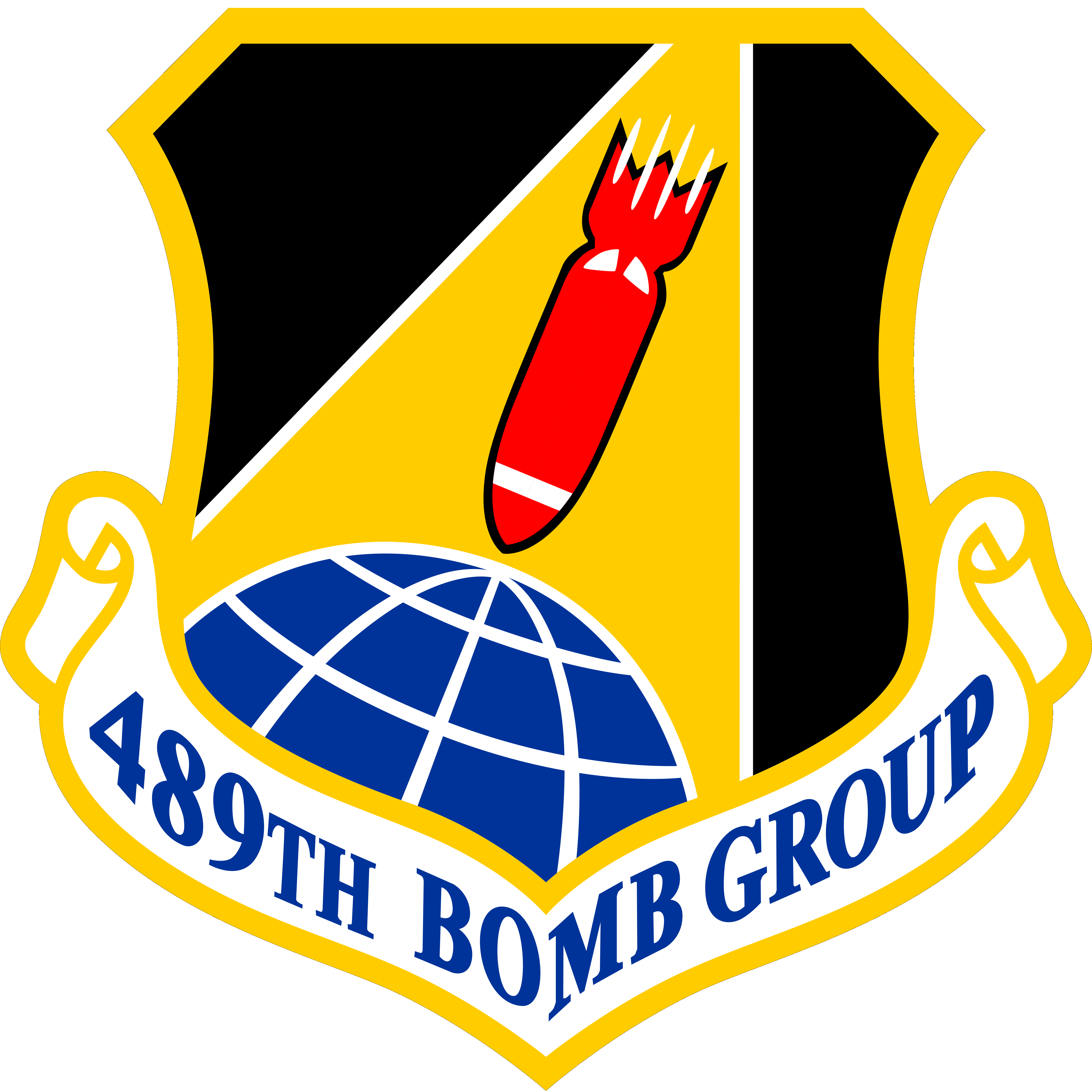
- 489th Bomb Group emblem (Note: Approved 23 May 2016.)

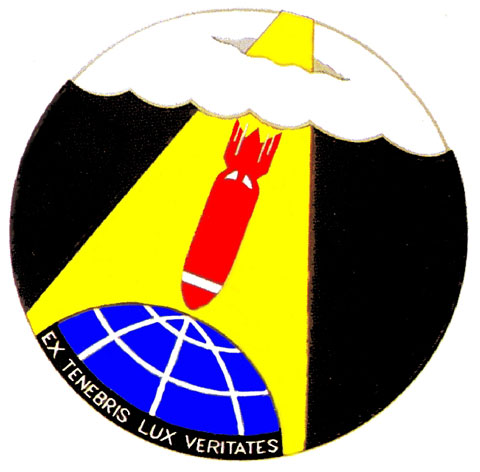
- 489th Bombardment Group emblem (World War II) (Note: Apparently, the group never received official approval of this emblem. See Maurer, Combat Units, pp. 358–359. (No official emblem).)
- Eighth Air Force tail code (Note: This code was also displayed on the aircraft wing. The group adopted an all yellow tail marking shortly after arriving in England and few aircraft displayed the assigned marking on the tail in addition to the wing. Watkins, pp. 114–115.): Circle W

The 489th Bomb Group is a unit of the United States Air Force within the Air Force Reserve Command. It is assigned to the 307th Bomb Wing, and is stationed at Dyess Air Force Base, Texas. The group is a reserve associate unit of the 7th Bomb Wing at Dyess.

During World War II, the 489th Bombardment Group was a Consolidated B-24 Liberator unit. After training in the United States, it moved to England as an element of Eighth Air Force, stationed at RAF Halesworth, England. Lieutenant Colonel Leon Vance of the group was awarded the Medal of Honor for his bravery and actions on the day before D-Day over Wimereux, France. It was the only Medal of Honor awarded to a B-24 crewman for a mission flown from England. (Note: Enid Air Force Base, Oklahoma was renamed Vance Air Force Base in memory of Col. Vance on 9 July 1949. Mueller, p. 567.) The group returned to the United States in November 1944 and converted to a Boeing B-29 Superfortress group, but the war ended before the group could deploy to the Pacific.

In October 2015, the group was reactivated in the Air Force Reserve.

== History ==
=== World War II ===
Media related to 489th Bombardment Group (United States Army Air Forces) at Wikimedia Commons

==== Training in the United States ====
The 489th Bombardment Group, Heavy was activated as a Consolidated B-24 Liberator heavy bomber group on 1 October 1943 at Wendover Field, Utah. Its original squadrons were the 844th, 845th, 846th and 847th Bombardment Squadrons. Shortly after organizing, key personnel left for training with the Army Air Forces School of Applied Tactics in Florida, where it flew simulated combat missions in company with the 491st Bombardment Group leadership, which was at a similar point in its training. The group completed combat training and departed Wendover on 3 April 1944. The air echelon flew to the UK via the southern ferry route along the northern coastline of South America and across the Atlantic to Africa before heading North to England. The ground echelon sailed from Boston on board the USS Wakefield on 13 April 1944, reaching Liverpool on 21 April. The group moved to RAF Halesworth, England in May 1944, where it became part of Eighth Air Force.

==== Combat in Europe ====
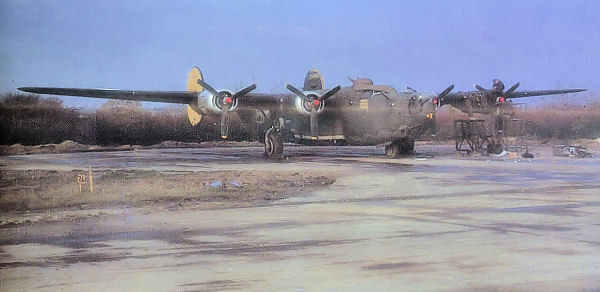
846th Bombardment Squadron B-24 Liberator (Note: Aircraft is Ford built Consolidated B-24H-20-FO Liberator serial 42-94860.)

The group entered combat on 30 May 1944 with an attack on Oldenburg, Germany. It then concentrated on targets striking in France to prepare for Operation Overlord, the invasion of Normandy. In an attack against coastal defenses near Wimereux, France on 5 June, the group's lead plane was seriously crippled by enemy fire, its pilot was killed, and the deputy group commander, Lt Col Leon Vance, who was commanding the formation, was severely wounded. Although his right foot was practically severed, Vance took control of the plane and led the group to a successful bombing of the target. He flew the damaged Liberator near the English coastline where he ordered the crew to bail out. Under the belief that one wounded crewmember could not jump, Vance ditched the plane in the English Channel and was rescued. For his action during this mission, Vance was awarded the Medal of Honor. (Note: In late July Lt Col Vance was evacuated back to the United States for medical treatment. The plane he was on disappeared over the Atlantic and all aboard were lost. Mueller, p. 567.)

The group supported the landings in Normandy the following day, and afterward bombed coastal defenses, airfields, bridges, railroads, and V-1 flying bomb and V-2 rocket launch sites (Operation Crossbow) in the campaign for France. It participated in the saturation bombing of German lines just before Operation Cobra, the breakthrough at Saint-Lô in July. The group dropped food to liberated French and to Allied forces in France during August and September, and carried food and ammunition to the Netherlands later in September. For these missions, a loadmaster from IX Troop Carrier Command directed the drops from the bombers. On other missions, group aircraft flew into Orleans/Bricy Airfield to deliver supplies.

The 489th began flying strategic bombing missions to Germany in July, and engaged primarily in bombing strategic targets such as factories, oil refineries and storage areas, marshalling yards, and airfields in Ludwigshafen, Magdeburg, Brunswick, Saarbrücken, and other cities until November 1944. At that time it was the first group in Eighth Air Force selected for redeployment to the Pacific theater and became non-operational on 14 November 1944 and most of its B-24s were assigned to other groups in England. It was relieved of assignment to the theater on 29 November 1944, and returned to the United States.

==== Redeployment for the Pacific ====
The 489th Bomb Group returned to Bradley Field Connecticut at the end of December 1944, where most returning personnel were reassigned to other units while the group moved to Lincoln Army Air Field, Nebraska. At Lincoln it again became part of Second Air Force on 22 January 1945, they were informed that previous plans for refresher training had been cancelled and instead the group and its associated 369th Air Service Group were retrained as Boeing B-29 Superfortress combat and support units. However Second Air Force did not receive redesignation orders for the group until 17 March, until which time they were compelled to maintain duplicate rosters and tables of organization, one for a heavy bombardment group of four squadrons, and one for a very heavy bombardment group of three squadrons. The readiness date for the group air echelon was set back from 1 March to 1 August 1945. The group moved to Great Bend Army Air Field, Kansas in mid-February to re-equip with the B-29, and was redesignated the 489th Bombardment Group, Very Heavy in March.

The group was alerted for movement overseas in the summer of 1945, but with the Japanese surrender, the group was inactivated on 17 October 1945.

=== Air Force Reserve ===
The Air Force reactivated the group as the Air Force Reserve Command's 489th Bomb Group on 17 October 2015, exactly 70 years after it was inactivated. The 489th operates from Dyess Air Force Base near Abilene, Texas, flying Rockwell B-1 Lancers and is an associate unit of the Regular Air Force's 7th Bomb Wing, operating the same aircraft. The 489th is assigned to the 307th Bomb Wing, a Boeing B-52 Stratofortress unit at Barksdale Air Force Base, Louisiana. Both the 489th and the 307th are "operationally-gained" by Air Force Global Strike Command when mobilized.

== Lineage ==
- Constituted as the 489th Bombardment Group, Heavy on 14 September 1943

Activated on 1 October 1943
Redesignated 489th Bombardment Group, Very Heavy on 17 March 1945
Inactivated on 17 October 1945

- Redesignated 489th Bomb Group on 8 October 2015

Activated in the Air Force Reserve on 17 October 2015

=== Assignments ===
- Second Air Force, 1 October 1943 – April 1944
- 95th Combat Bombardment Wing, 5 April 1944
- 20th Combat Bombardment Wing, 14 August – 29 November 1944
- Second Air Force, 12 December 1944 – 17 October 1945
- 307th Bomb Wing, 17 October 2015 – present

=== Components ===
Operational squadrons

- 345th Bomb Squadron, 17 October 2015 – present
- 844th Bombardment Squadron, 1 October 1943 – 17 October 1945
- 845th Bombardment Squadron, 1 October 1943 – 17 October 1945
- 846th Bombardment Squadron, 1 October 1943 – 17 October 1945
- 847th Bombardment Squadron, 13 October 1943 – 28 March 1945

Support units

- 489th Maintenance Squadron, 17 October 2015 – Present
- 489th Aerospace Medical Flight, 17 October 2015 – Present
- 1st Photographic Laboratory (Bombardment Group, Very Heavy), 17 March 1944 – 17 October 1945

=== Stations ===
- Wendover Field, Utah, 1 October 1943 – 3 April 1944
- RAF Halesworth (AAF-365), England, c. 1 May – November 1944 (Station 365)
- Bradley Field, Connecticut 12 December 1944
- Lincoln Army Air Field, Nebraska, c. 17 December 1944
- Great Bend Army Air Field, Kansas c. 18 February 1945
- Davis–Monthan Field, Arizona, 3 April 1945
- Fairmont Army Air Field, Nebraska c. 13 July 1945
- Fort Lawton, Washington 23 August 1945
- March Field, California 2 September – 17 October 1945
- Dyess Air Force Base 17 October 2015 – present

=== Aircraft ===
- Consolidated B-24 Liberator, 1943–1944
- Boeing B-29 Superfortress, 1945
- Rockwell B-1B Lancer, 2015–present

=== Campaigns ===
Campaign Streamer	Campaign	Dates	Notes
	Air Offensive, Europe	c. 1 May 1943 – 5 June 1944	489th Bombardment Group
	Normandy	6 June 1944 – 24 July 1944	489th Bombardment Group
	Northern France	25 July 1944 – 14 September 1944	489th Bombardment Group
	Rhineland	15 September 1944-November 1944	489th Bombardment Group

== See also ==
- B-24 Liberator units of the United States Army Air Forces
- List of B-1 units of the United States Air Force
- List of B-29 Superfortress operators
- List of United States Air Force Groups
