= 95th Combat Bombardment Wing =

Inactive United States Air Force unit

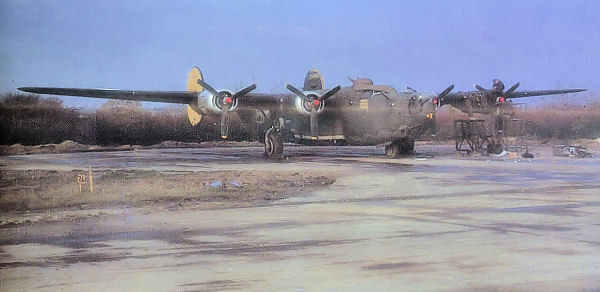
- 489th Bombardment Group B-24 Liberator (Note: Aircraft is Ford-built Consolidated B-24H-20-FO Liberator, serial 42-94860. The yellow tail marking dates from the group's transfer to another wing.)
- Active: 1943-1945
- Country: United States
- Branch: United States Air Force
- Role: Bombardment
- Part of: Eighth Air Force
- Engagements: European Theater of Operations

Insignia
- Tail markings: Green with white stripe (vertical for 489th Group, horizontal for 491st Group)

The 95th Combat Bombardment Wing is a former United States Army Air Forces unit. It was activated in England in 1943 and engaged in strategic bombing campaign against Germany from June through August 1944. It returned to the United States in July 1945 and was disbanded in late August 1945.

== History ==
The 95th Combat Bombardment Wing was activated at RAF Attlebridge, England in December 1943, but was only an administrative headquarters, with no combat units assigned. In February 1944, the wing was assigned to the 2d Bombardment Division and moved to the division's station of Ketteringham Hall.

The wing finally received combat elements in late April 1944, when two newly arrived Consolidated B-24 Liberator groups, the 489th and 491st Bombardment Groups were assigned to the wing. The 95th Wing moved its headquarters to RAF Halesworth in early May as its groups prepared for combat. The 491st Group arrived with only an air element assigned, and was filled out by ground support personnel drawn from 2d Bombardment Division groups assigned to other wings. The 489th flew its first combat mission on 30 May, and the 491st on 2 June. Although the wing's groups were deployed to engage in the strategic bombing campaign against Germany, their immediate missions were flown in support of Operation Overlord, the invasion of Normandy. They supported the D-Day landings, and bombed coastal defenses, airfields, bridges, railroads, and V-1 flying bomb and V-2 rocket launch sites (Operation Crossbow). They also participated in the saturation bombing of German lines just before Operation Cobra, the breakthrough at Saint-Lô in July. It was late July before the wing turned to strategic targets.

The wing's combat participation was brief. In mid-August, the 489th Group was assigned to the 20th Combat Bombardment Wing and the 491st to the 14th Combat Bombardment Wing, while the wing closed its headquarters at Halesworth and returned to Ketteringham Hall. It remained there, without combat elements, until July 1945, when it moved to Sioux Falls Army Air Field, South Dakota as part of the redeployment of forces from Europe after V-E Day. After Japan's surrender in August 1945, the wing was disbanded.

== Lineage ==
- Constituted as the 95th Combat Bombardment Wing, Heavy on 2 November 1943

Activated on 12 December 1943
Disbanded on 28 August 1945

=== Assignments ===
- VIII Bomber Command, 12 December 1943
- 2d Bombardment Division, 22 February 1944 – 18 June 1945
- Second Air Force, c. 23 July–28 August 1945

=== Units assigned ===
- 489th Bombardment Group, c. 25 April–15 August 1944
- 491st Bombardment Group, c. 25 April–15 August 1944

=== Stations ===
- RAF Attlebridge, England, 12 December 1943
- Ketteringham Hall, England, c. 22 February 1944
- RAF Halesworth, England, c. 5 May 1944
- Ketteringham Hall, England, August 1944 – c. 12 July 1945
- Sioux Falls Army Air Field, South Dakota, c. 23 July–28 August 1945

=== Campaigns ===
Campaign Streamer	Campaign	Dates	Notes
	Air Offensive, Europe	30 May 1944 – 5 June 1944	95th Combat Bombardment Wing
	Normandy	6 June 1944 – 24 July 1944	95th Combat Bombardment Wing
	Northern France	25 July 1944 – 15 August 1944	95th Combat Bombardment Wing

== See also ==
- B-24 Liberator units of the United States Army Air Forces
