= Munde (surname) =

Munde is a surname. Notable people with the surname include:

- Alan Munde (born 1946), American banjo player and bluegrass musician
- Gopinath Munde (1949–2014), Indian politician
- Dhananjay Munde (born 1975), Indian politician
- Pankaja Munde (born 1979), Indian politician
- Pritam Munde (born 1983), Indian politician
