= Mundy (disambiguation) =

Mundy (born Edmund Enright) is an Irish singer-songwriter.

Mundy may also refer to:

- Mundy Township, Michigan, a charter township in Genesee County
- Mundy Park, the largest park in Coquitlam, British Columbia
- Mundy Regional Park, a regional park in Western Australia
- Mundy (surname)
- Mundy Hepburn, an American artist
- Mundys, an Italian holding company
