= Monde (disambiguation) =

Monde, a French word meaning "world", is an orb located near the top of a crown.

Monde or Le Monde may also refer to:

- Monde (review), a weekly French magazine on international cultural and politics (published from 1928 to 1935)
- Le Monde, a daily newspaper of record in France
- Le Monde diplomatique, a monthly newspaper offering analysis and opinion
- The World (Descartes), or Le monde, full title Traité du monde et de la lumière, a book by René Descartes
- "Le monde" (song), 2014 song by M. Pokora
- Leon Monde (1895–unknown), American basketball player
- Monde Nissin, a Philippine multinational food and beverage company
- Monde Selection, food and drink, and cosmetics product quality award
