= RAF Halesworth =

Former Royal Air Force station in Suffolk, England

RAF Halesworth RAF Holton USAAF Station 365 RNAS Halesworth HMS Sparrowhawk
- Located Near Southwold, Suffolk, United Kingdom
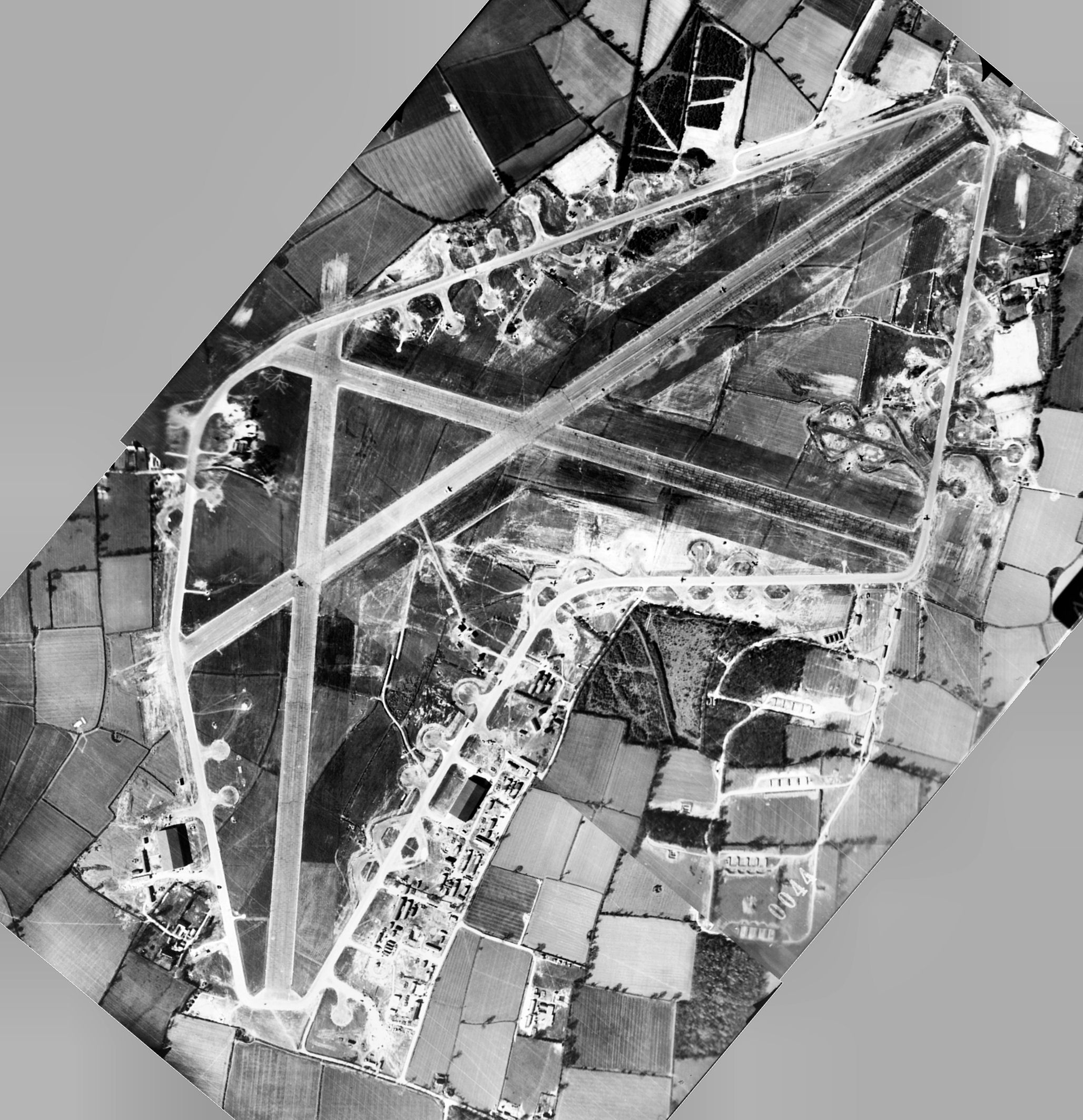
- Aerial photograph mosaic of Halesworth (Holton) airfield, P-47 Thunderbolts of the 56th Fighter Group are taxying on the perimeter and main runway, 18 April 1944. Photograph taken by 31st Photographic Squadron, 10th Photographic Reconnaissance Group, sortie number US/31GR/LOC17

Site information
- Type: Royal Air Force station
- Code: HA
- Owner: Air Ministry
- Operator: Royal Navy (1945 - 1946)
- Controlled by: United States Army Air Forces (1943 - 1945); Fleet Air Arm (1945 - 1946)

Location
- Map showing the location of RAF Halesworth within Suffolk.
- Coordinates: 52°21′56″N 001°31′26″E

Site history
- Built: 1942
- In use: 1942-1946
- Battles/wars: European Theatre of World War II; Air Offensive, Europe July 1942 - May 1945

Garrison information
- Garrison: Eighth Air Force
- Occupants: 56th Fighter Group; 489th Bombardment Group

Royal Air Force Halesworth or more simply RAF Halesworth is a former Royal Air Force station located 2 miles (3 km) north east of the town of Halesworth, Suffolk, England and 7 miles (11 km) west of Southwold.

== United States Army Air Forces ==
Halesworth was built between 1942–1943 and was intended for use as a bomber station, and was built as such with a 6,000 feet (1,829 m) length main runway and two secondary runways of 4,200 feet (1,280 m) in length. There was an encircling perimeter track with 51 hardstands and two T-2 hangars. Nissen hut accommodations for about 3,000 personnel were also built south of the airfield.

USAAF Station Units assigned to RAF Halesworth were:

- 474th Sub-Depot
- 18th Weather Squadron
- 328th Station Complement Squadron
- Headquarters (95th Combat Bomb Wing)

Regular Army Station Units included:

- 1235th Quartermaster Company
- 1800th Ordnance Supply & Maintenance Company
- 867th Chemical Company
- 983rd Military Police Company
- 2106th Engineer Fire Fighting Platoon

The airfield was assigned USAAF designation Station 365 (HA).

=== 56th Fighter Group ===
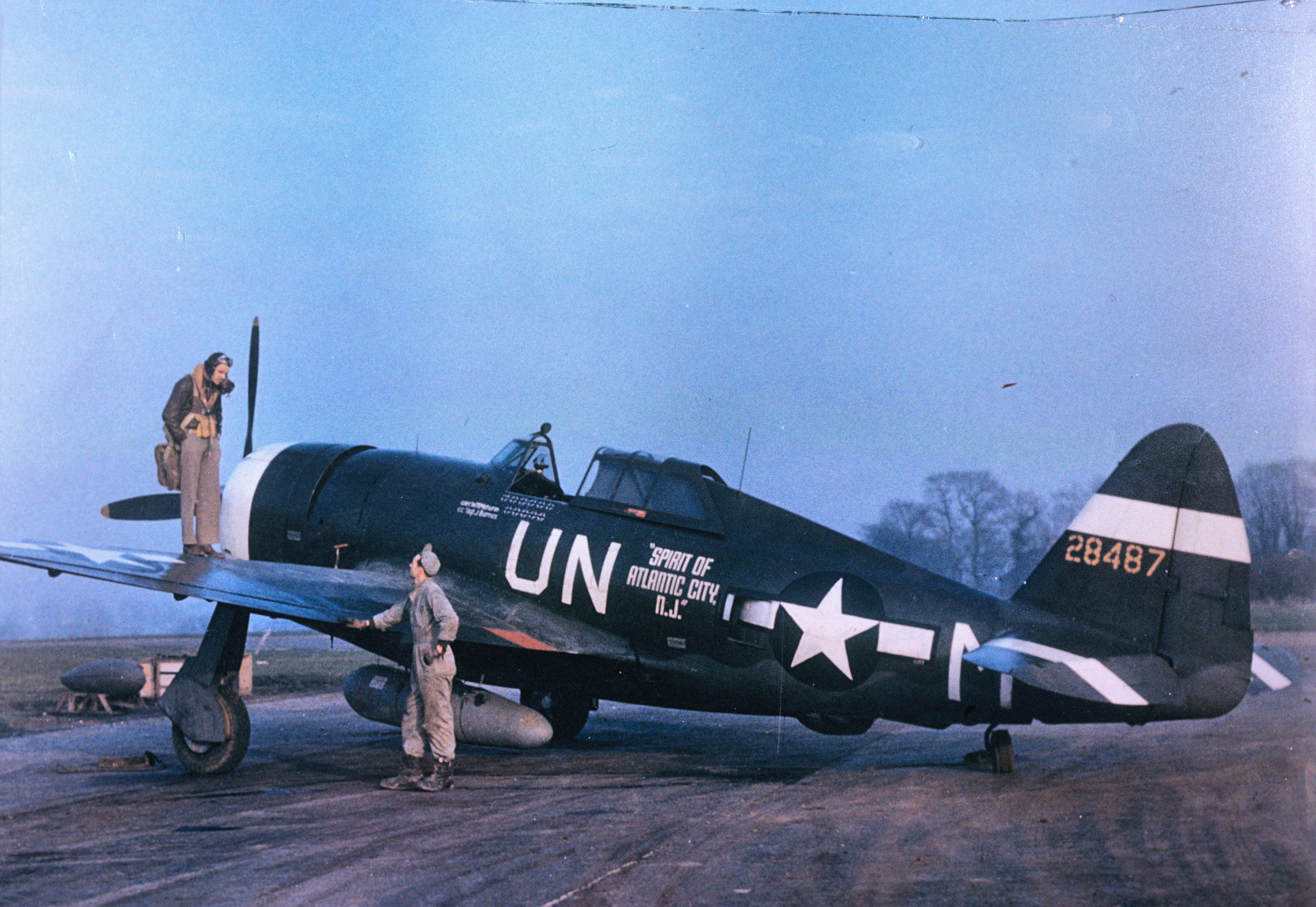
Captain Walker "Bud" Mahurin of the 56th Fighter Group standing on the port wing of his P-47 Thunderbolt aircraft, conversing with its crew chief, Staff Sergeant John E. Barnes. The aircraft had been "bought" courtesy of war bonds purchased (to a value approximately equivalent to the cost of a fighter) by the citizens of Atlantic City, New Jersey. Consequently, the name painted on the aircraft was chosen by Atlantic City.

The first unit to use Halesworth was the 56th Fighter Group which arrived from RAF Horsham St Faith on 9 July 1943. Its operational squadrons were:

- 61st Fighter Squadron (HV)
- 62d Fighter Squadron (LM)
- 63d Fighter Squadron (UN)

Being only eight miles from the Suffolk coast, Halesworth was ideally located for escort fighter operations, where range was an important factor. For this reason the 56th Fighter Group was moved there. Flying Republic P-47 Thunderbolts, the group flew numerous missions over France, the Low Countries, and Germany to escort bombers attacking industrial establishments, V-weapon sites, submarine pens, and other targets on the Continent.

In addition the 56th strafed and dive-bombed airfields, troops, and supply points; attacked the enemy communications; and flew counter-air patrols.

The 56th became one of the most outstanding fighter organisations in the Eighth Air Force, producing many of the top fighter aces including Francis Gabreski and Robert S. Johnson. The group was responsible for pioneering most of the successful fighter escort tactics with the Thunderbolt and had many successes while operating from Halesworth.

On 19 April 1944 the group had to vacate the airfield as it was needed for a new B-24 Liberator group and was transferred to RAF Boxted.

=== 489th Bombardment Group (Heavy) ===
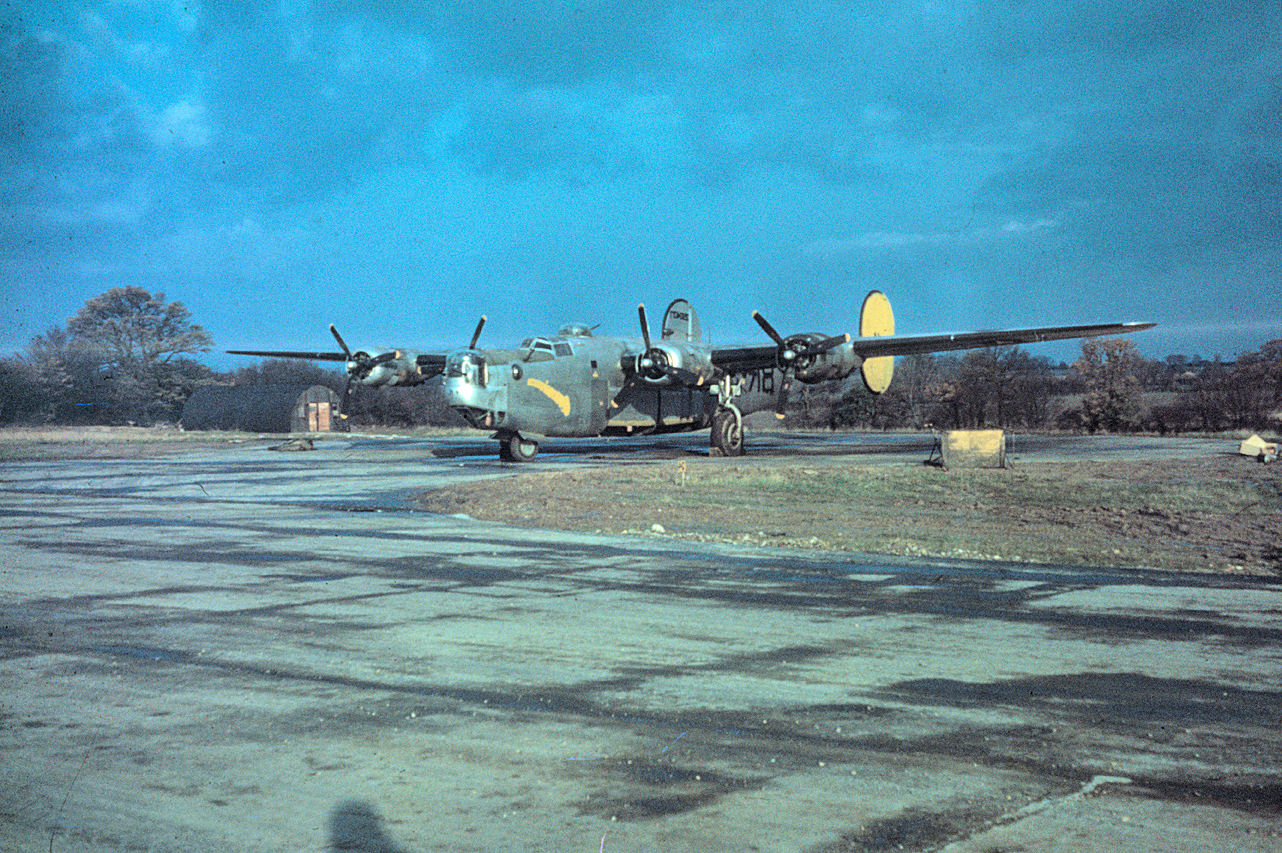
A B-24 Liberator (serial number 42-50437) nicknamed "Apassionata" of the 489th Bomb Group.

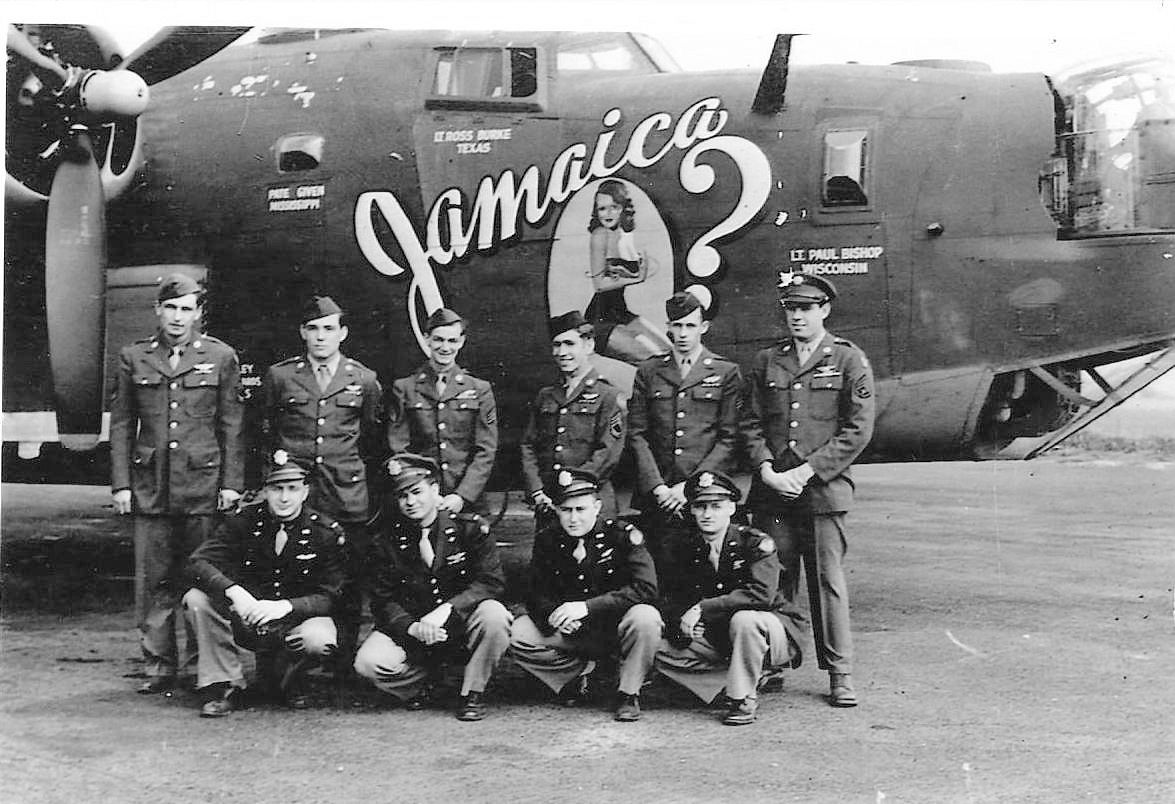
Crew of B-24 Liberator "Jamaica". This crew flew 18 missions with the 466th BG before being transferred to the 389th BG for six missions, the 489th BG for three missions and then finishing up with the 492nd BG for the final three missions.

The Eighth Air Force 489th Bombardment Group (Heavy) arrived at RAF Halesworth from Wendover AAF Utah on 1 May 1944. The group was assigned to the 20th Combat Bombardment Wing and the group tail code was a "Circle-W". Its operational squadrons were:

- 844th Bombardment Squadron (4R)
- 845th Bombardment Squadron (T4)
- 846th Bombardment Squadron (8R)
- 847th Bombardment Squadron (S4)

The 489th flew the Consolidated B-24 Liberator as part of the Eighth Air Force's strategic bombing campaign. The group entered combat on 30 May 1944, and during the next few days concentrated on targets in France in preparation for the Normandy invasion.

In an attack against coastal defences near Wimereaux on 5 June 1944, the group's lead plane was seriously crippled by enemy fire, its pilot was killed, and the deputy group commander, Lt. Col. Leon R. Vance Jr., who was commanding the formation, was severely wounded; although his right foot was practically severed, Vance took control of the plane, led the group to a successful bombing of the target, and managed to fly the damaged aircraft to the coast of England, where he ordered the crew to bail out; believing a wounded man had been unable to jump, he ditched the plane in the English Channel and was rescued. For his action during this mission, Vance was awarded the Medal of Honor.

The group supported the landings in Normandy on 6 June 1944, and afterward bombed coastal defences, airfields, bridges, railroads, and V-weapon sites in the campaign for France. It began flying missions into Germany in July, and engaged primarily in bombing strategic targets such as factories, oil refineries and storage plants, marshalling yards, and airfields in Ludwigshafen, Magdeburg, Brunswick, Saarbrücken, and other cities until November 1944.

Other operations included participating in the saturation bombing of German lines just before the breakthrough at Saint-Lô in July, dropping food to the liberated French and to Allied forces in France during August and September, and carrying food and ammunition to the Netherlands later in September.

The 489th Bomb Group returned to Bradley AAF Connecticut in November 1944 to prepare for redeployment to the Pacific theater. Redesignated 489th Bombardment Group (Very Heavy) in March 1945 and was re-equipped with Boeing B-29 Superfortresses. The group was alerted for movement overseas in the summer of 1945, but war with Japan ended before the group left the US. Inactivated on 17 October 1945.

=== 5th Emergency Rescue Squadron ===
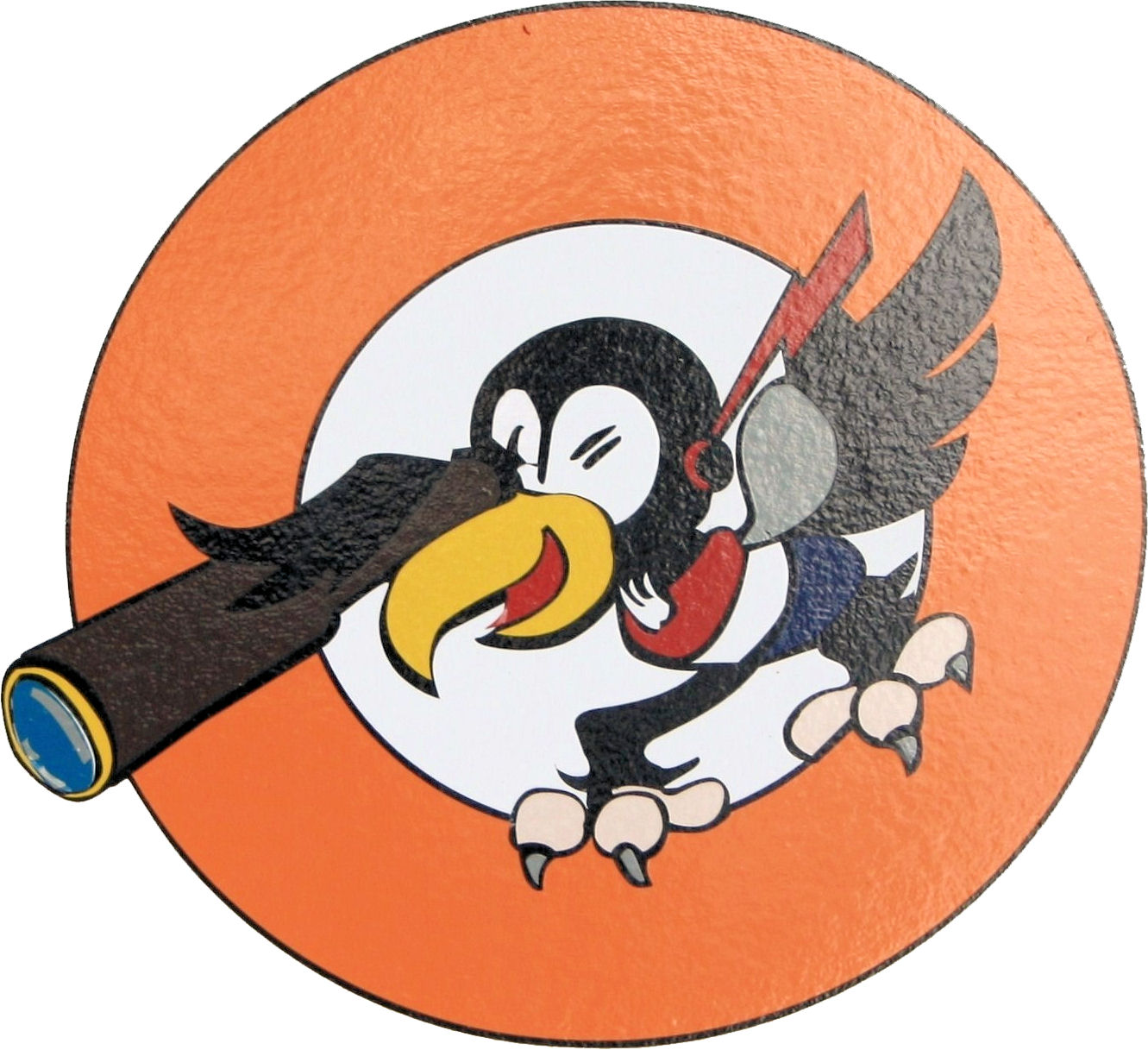
Emblem of the 5th Emergency Rescue Squadron.

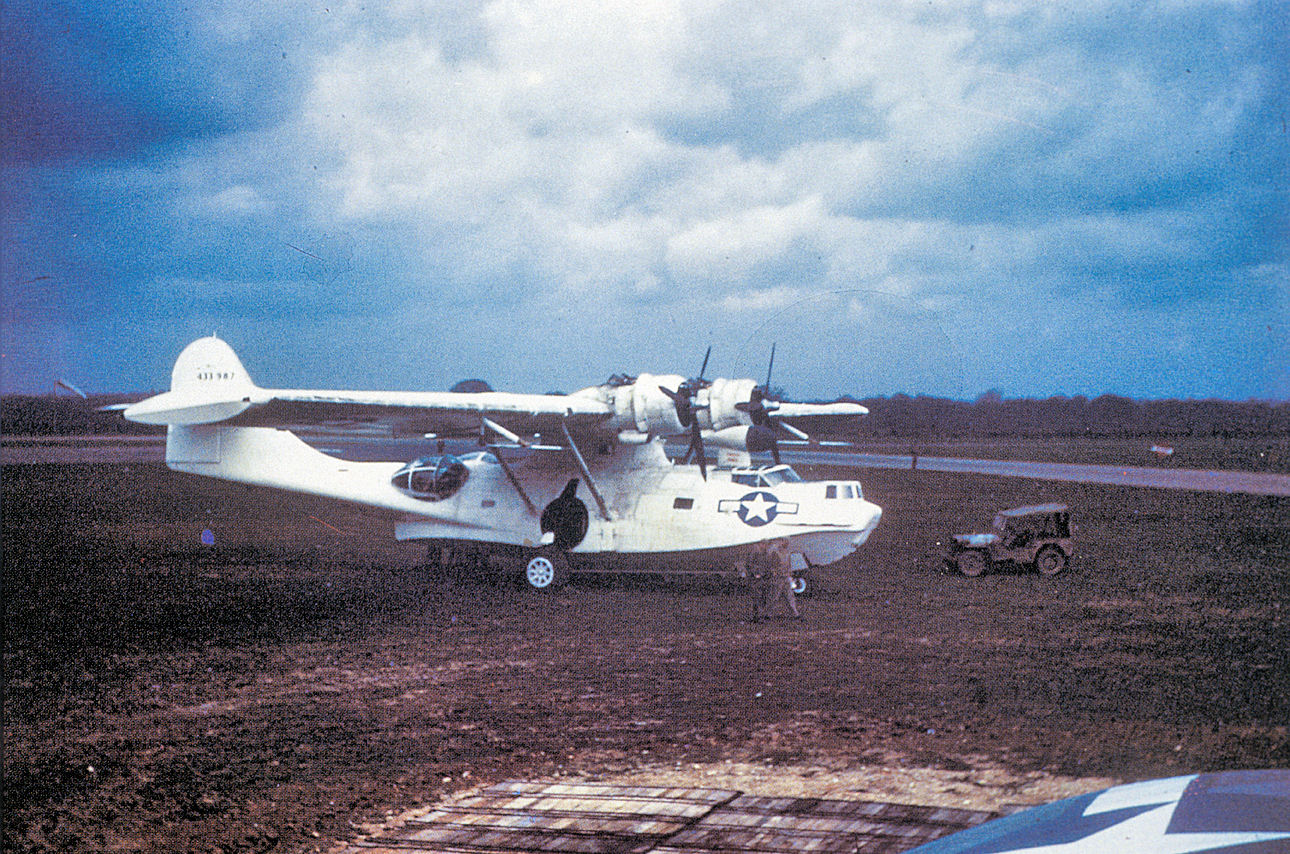
Canadian Vickers OA-10A Catalina Serial Number 44-33987 of the 5th ERS. This aircraft was built in Canada under a Navy contract as a PBV-1A, then redesignated when delivered to the USAAF.

In January 1945 the 5th Emergency Rescue Squadron moved to Halesworth from RAF Boxted with special P-47s, OA-10 Catalina amphibians and Boeing SB-17 Fortresses equipped with lifeboats for air-sea rescue work. The 5th ERS remained active, and it conducted many rescues until the end of hostilities.

The airfield was also used until the end of the war as an operational training airfield for North American P-51 Mustang pilots.

== Royal Navy ==
A request from the Royal Navy for lodger facilities at RAF Halesworth from No. 16 Group was granted. On 5 June 1945 the airbase was transferred on loan to the Admiralty until October 1946 and known as Royal Naval Air Station Halesworth, or more commonly referred to as RNAS Halesworth. On 5 August it was commissioned as HMS Sparrowhawk with Captain L.A.K. Boswell, DSO, as commanding officer.

=== Twin Engine Conversion Unit ===
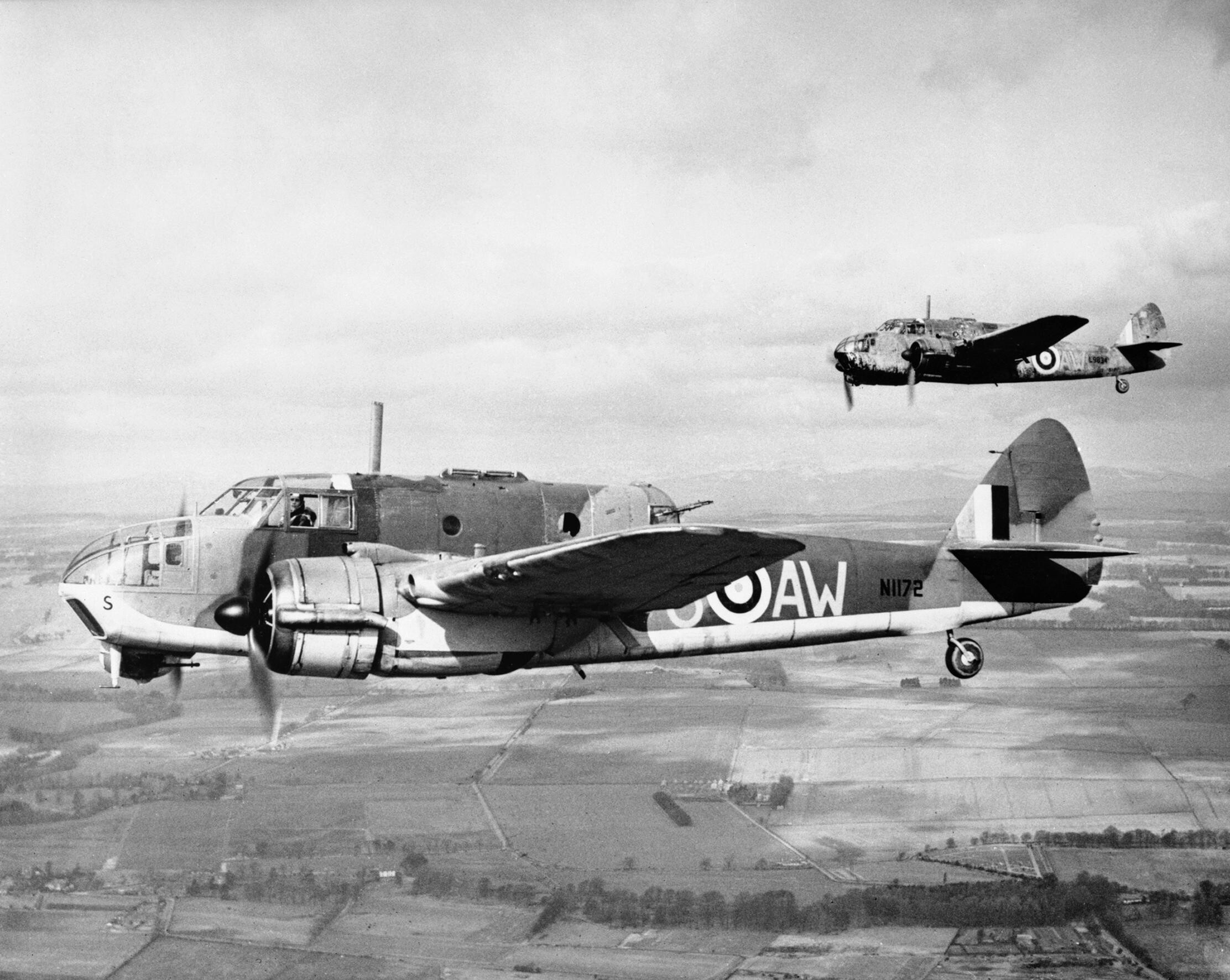
Beaufort Mark I, seen in No. 42 Squadron RAF, although an example of the type used by 762 NAS

762 Naval Air Squadron was the Royal Navy’s Fleet Air Arm Twin Engine Conversion Unit. The squadron moved here from RNAS Dale (HMS Goldcrest) in Pembrokeshire, on 3 December 1945. It operated with various twin-engined aircraft for pilot / aircrew conversion training:

- Bristol Beaufort I & T.II, a British twin-engined torpedo bomber
- Bristol Beaufighter II, a British Heavy fighter / Attack aircraft / Torpedo bomber
- Bristol Blenheim IV, a British Light bomber, Night fighter, Aerial reconnaissance aircraft
- Airspeed Oxford a British a twin-engine monoplane trainer aircraft
- Vickers Wellington XI, a British twin-engined, long-range medium bomber

The unit remained at RNAS Halesworth for around six weeks before moving south to RNAS Ford (HMS Peregrine), in Sussex, on 15 January 1946.

=== Advanced Single Engine Conversion & Refresher Flying Training Unit ===
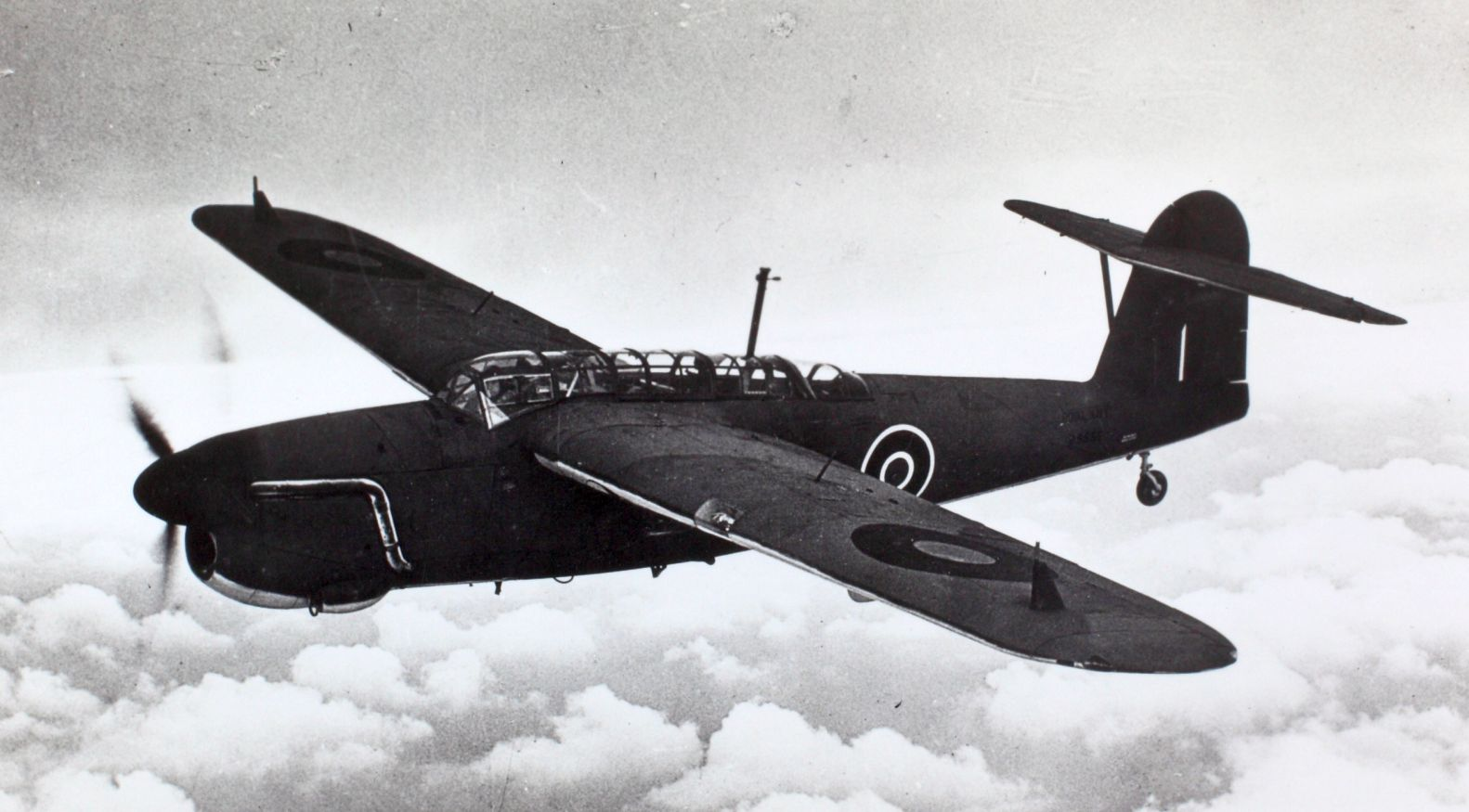
Fairey Barracuda Mk I, torpedo and dive bomber. First production version, Rolls-Royce Merlin 30 engine, an example of the type used by 798 Naval Air Squadron

798 Naval Air Squadron was the Advanced Single Engine Conversion & Refresher Flying Training Unit of the Royal Navy’s Fleet Air Arm. The squadron moved here from RNAS Lee-on-Solent (HMS Daedalus), in Hampshire, on 6 September 1945.

The unit was equipped with an assortment of aircraft with which to operate and provide the conversion training and refresher courses, which included:

- Fairey Barracuda, a British carrier-borne torpedo and dive bomber
- Fairey Firefly, a British carrier-borne fighter and anti-submarine aircraft
- North American Harvard, an American single-engined advanced trainer aircraft
- Supermarine Seafire, a naval version of the Supermarine Spitfire fighter, adapted for operation from aircraft carriers
- de Havilland Tiger Moth, a British biplane primary trainer aircraft

It remained at the Suffolk airbase for around five months, moving to RNAS Peplow (HMS Godwit II), in Shropshire, on the 28 February 1946.

=== Closure ===
RNAS Halesworth closed on the same day 798 NAS left and was reduced to Care and Maintenance status. Two weeks later HMS Sparrowhawk was ‘paid-off’ by the Royal Navy, on 15 March 1946, and the airbase was returned to the Royal Air Force.

== Post-war Governmental use ==
After the war, the Halesworth was closed for flying in February 1946. It was turned over to the Ministry of Food for storage until it was sold in 1963.

== Civil use ==
With the end of government control, the land was returned to agricultural use and little of the wartime buildings remains; a few derelict huts and ancillary buildings on some of the dispersed sites. Most of the remaining runways, perimeter track, etc. are now utilised as part of the Bernard Matthews turkey production site, with a number of large sheds erected on the runways.

In May 1983 the 489th Bomb Group was permanently commemorated by the dedication of a granite memorial which has been erected on a small plot of land at the southern end of the old north-south runway. Adjacent to this is a memorial to the 56th Fighter Group who also flew from Halesworth. Nearby is the Halesworth Airfield Museum, whose exhibits include photographs, unit memorabilia and many other items relating to the airfield, its wartime occupants and activities. The museum displays a limited collection of 489th memorabilia, but the main 489th Bomb Group Museum, together with that of the 93rd Bomb Group, is sited at Hardwick, in Norfolk.

The cockpit section of a C-54 is on display at the old combat mess site which is further along the road from the memorials, and a drop tank gives details of the three groups who served at Halesworth airfield during World War II. There is a wall plaque in nearby St. Peter's Church, Holton, in honour of all who flew from this airfield, and the church has kneelers made by 489th Bomb Group veterans' wives.

Dotted around the site, at the edges of old runways and taxi paths, are a number of large wind turbines, and a large solar panel farm is at the western end of it.

In February 2007, Halesworth was reported as the location for an outbreak of so-called 'bird flu', resulting in the culling of 159,000 turkeys at Bernard Matthews.

== See also ==
- List of former Royal Air Force stations
- List of air stations of the Royal Navy
