= Great Bend Army Air Field =

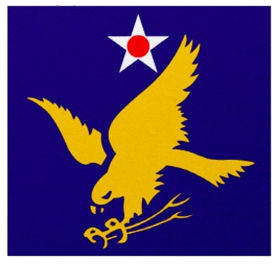
Great Bend Army Air Field
- Part of Second Air Force
- Located Near: Great Bend, Kansas
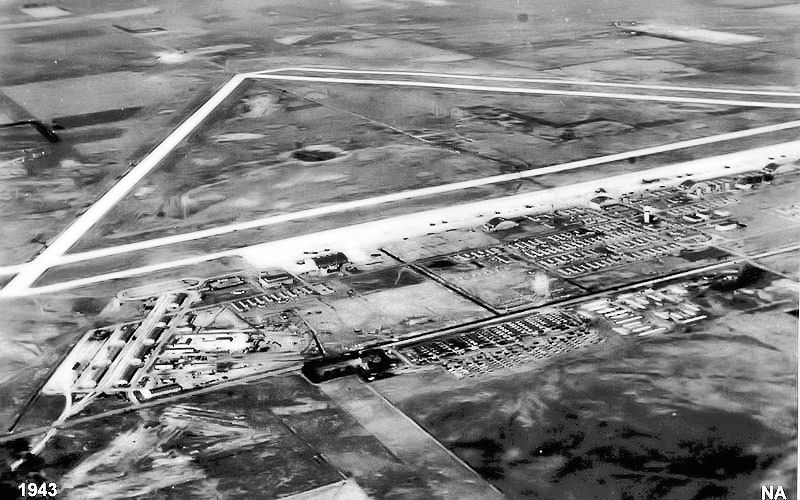
- 1943 oblique airphoto

Location
- Coordinates: 38°20′47″N 98°51′55″W

Site history
- Built: 1942
- In use: 1942–1946

Great Bend Army Air Field is a closed United States Air Force base. It is located 5.6 miles (9.0 km) west-southwest of Great Bend, Kansas, and was closed in 1946. Today it is used as Great Bend Municipal Airport.

Great Bend Army Air Field (AAF) is significantly historic as it was in the first group United States Army Air Forces B-29 Superfortress bases for initial training on the aircraft in the summer of 1943. Along with Walker Army Air Field near Victoria, Pratt Army Air Field near Pratt and Smoky Hill Army Air Field near Salina the initial cadre of the 58th Bombardment Wing was formed. The 58th Bomb Wing was the first B-29 combat wing of World War II and engaged in the first long-range strategic bombardment of the Japanese Home Islands beginning in June 1944 from bases in India.

== History ==
The first public announcement of intentions to build an airfield at Great Bend, Kansas on the Arkansas River in Barton county, came in the form of a telegram from Sen. Arthur Capper of Kansas to the secretary of the Great Bend Chamber of Commerce on 30 September 1942. But, of course, by then all the preliminary work had been done. In July of that year the site at Great Bend had been chosen. Nor was all the initiative left to the Army. A committee of leading citizens from Great Bend and Hoisington had made the original proposal. Originally, plans called for the Civil Aeronautics Administration to supply the funds, and, with war's end, Barton county and Great Bend would acquire ownership. However, this tentative arrangement was subsequently changed so that the field was built under the auspices of the Air Force.

Originally intended to serve merely as a satellite base of Smoky Hill Army Air Field at Salina, Kansas, the physical plant at Great Bend was initially decidedly limited in its functional utility and in size. Most of the construction work was done by Patti-McDonald Construction Company of Kansas City, but the concrete work on runways and taxiways was undertaken by the W.L. Johnson Construction company. Essentials were completed first. Three 8'000-foot concrete runways were constructed to accommodate B-29s, each 150 feet wide. Most of the buildings were Theater of Operations construction while some were of the Mobilization type. The Mobilization type buildings included the station hospital, theater, chapel, and Link training buildings. There were three hangars with a parking apron a mile long and 450 feet wide were constructed. Where before there had been only open farm land, this new city now contained over 200 buildings, a water storage and distribution system, sewage system and treatment plant, electric transmission lines. These were followed in time by facilities for recreation and services. During the summer and fall of 1943 a service club, theater, and bowling alley were completed.

=== B-29 Superfortress training ===
Capt. Theodore C. Reid, post engineer, was the first officer to report for duty on the base. He arrived on 18 January 1943. The first enlisted men to arrive, detachments of the 501st Base Headquarters and Air Base Squadron, the 1159th Guard Squadron, and the 902d Quartermaster Company, were necessarily housed in Great Bend for a time, there being no facilities on the base. On 13 February 1943 the 501st was transferred to Great Bend to become the headquarters squadron on the new field. Capping the inchoate organizational structure, Lt. Col. Glenn M. Pike assumed command of the field on 26 February. The first recorded Morning Report, dated 5 March 1943, lists 13 officers and 182 enlisted men. From these modest beginnings, which was, of course a skeleton force even for the limited role the field was originally designed to play, Great Bend was to grow impressively, both as a mission and physical plant. By 31 January 1945 a total of 6,409 personnel would be stationed there.

In keeping with its scheduled function of processing heavy bombardment groups, Great Bend Army Air Field was assigned to the 21st Bombardment Wing on 16 January 1943. It was the function of the 21st to operate processing bases, but, besides processing it did some training also. As early as March 1943 it was known that the Great Bend AAF was to be charged with the responsibility of training personnel for the new B-29 very heavy bomber. on 1 July 1943 Second Air Force transferred the 5th Heavy Bombardment Processing Unit to Great Bend to facilitate the training program. To bring its nomenclature more into harmony with its function, the 5th Heavy Bombardment Processing Unit was redesignated the 73d Bombardment Operational Training Wing on 17 August. But the new organization endured for scarcely four months before it was disbanded on 22 October, subsequent to the reassignment of the 58th Bombardment Operational Training Wing to Second Air Force. Both the personnel and the several bases of the 73d, among which figured Great Bend Army Air Field, were transferred to the 58th.

To accommodative the B-29, physical expansion of necessity became the order of the day. Original plans were altered, providing for considerable additions to the runway and taxiway systems. Additional troop housing was built, and new hangars we constructed especially designed to accommodate the B-29.

Great Bend received the 444th Bombardment Group (VH) and by April 1944, its training completed, the 444th departed for overseas service. During the remainder of its career, Great Bend was destined to train three more very heavy bombardment groups, the 498th, the 19th, and 333d, and in addition, it retrained the ground echelon of the 489th back from Europe for redeployment to the Pacific. The extreme development issues of B-29 aircraft, however, hampered the training efforts for some time. Consequently, for several months the group in training at Great Bend perforce used second-line B-17Es and B-17Fs and B-26C's for the most part, with a sprinkling of B-29's when they became available.

On 25 March 1944 the units permanently assigned to Great Bend AAF were reorganized in the 243d AAF Base Unit (OTU) (VH). Thereafter, Great Bend was organized under the standard plan for OTU (Operational Training Unit) bases. However, since the new directorate was not prepared immediately to take up its burden, the group in training at that time, the 498th, continued to train itself as the 444th had done before it. Consequently, it was only with the 19th Bombardment Group (VH), which began training in September 1944, that the 243d AAFBU took over the training responsibilities.

Beginning with the winter of 1945, part of the flying training was conducted at Borinquen Field, Puerto Rico. The primary purpose of this program, termed the "Gypsy Task Force," was to take advantage of the good flying weather in Puerto Rico during the winter months, enabling the crews to complete their training much quicker than would otherwise have been the case. With this phase of training over, the crews would return to Great Bend AAF to prepare for departure to a staging area. The program was discontinued in April 1945, after only one season.

With the arrival of the ground echelon of the 489th Bombardment Group in February 1945 from the European theater, Great Bend became one of the first redeployment installations in the country. At that time the 333d Bombardment Group (VH) was receiving its regular training, but the ground echelon of the 489th was trained on B-29 maintenance alongside the men of the 333d. After a relatively short transition course in the B-29 (they were already experienced maintenance men) the 489th left in March to join the air echelon of the group, which had received transition training at several different bases.

=== Closure ===
Victory over Japan had a direct effect on the mission and activity of the base. The 333d Bombardment Group (VH), having completed its training, left Great Bend during July and August 1945. No other groups were assigned for a full schedule of training, but the 44th Bombardment Group (VH) and the 405th Service Group used Great Bend as an assembly point. Indeed, in this period the primary mission of the base became that of discharging qualified men—or rather of transferring them to separation centers.

Great Bend became a temporary home for Boeing B-29 Superfortresses being produced by Boeing Wichita until the production line shut down in October. One of the aircraft stored at Great Bend was Kee Bird 45-2176, and other Superfotresses used by Strategic Air Command into the 1950s for various missions.

On 25 October 1945 the base was officially informed by Second Air Force that the installation would be put on a standby basis on 31 December 1945. Following this announcement, activities on the base (except that of shipping men to separation centers) slowed up considerably.

During December the 44th Bombardment Group (VH) and the 405th Air Service Group were transferred to Salina Army Air Field. Second Air Force had placed Great Bend AAF in the category of those fields whose retention was desirable for standby, with a possibility of being reopened on 30 days' notice. Consequently, one of the principal activities of December consisted of inactivating buildings.

As late as March 1946 Great Bend was still in the category of temporarily inactive or standby under the Second Air Force. However, the field was never subsequently activated. For a short time, during 1950 (and possibly 1949), the field was host to an Air Force reserve unit.

Sources are lacking by which to trace the subsequent steps leading to complete inactivation and transfer to the Army's District Engineer, Seventh Service Command at Omaha, Nebraska who assumed jurisdiction over the field, pending disposition by March 1951.

Excess buildings and demilitarized equipment were sold or transferred to other bases. Some were torn down and sales were held for scrap lumber of torn down buildings, fence posts, barbed wire and other items which no longer had a useful need.

== Current status ==
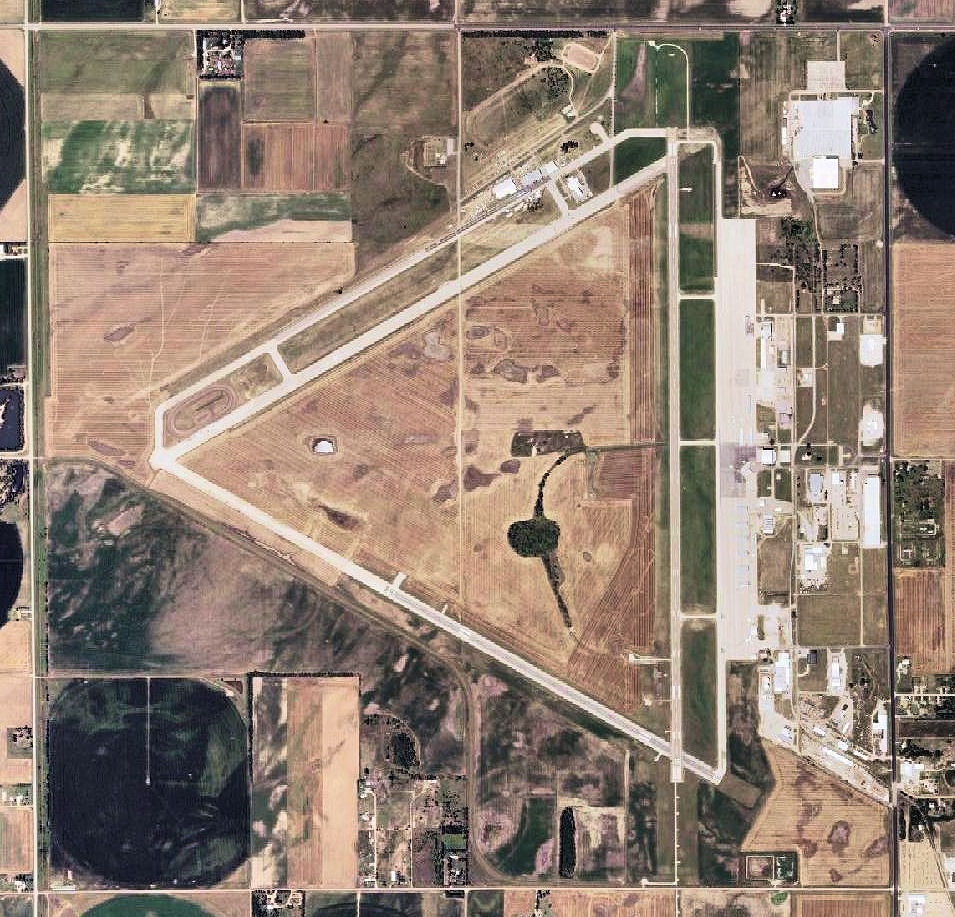
2006 USGS photo of the former Great Bend Army Air Field

The General Services Administration eventually turned the air base over to local government officials. Since then the installation has been operated by the city of Great Bend as its municipal airport.

The World War II airfield remains largely intact, two of the runways still in use by the civil airport. The large parking apron remains, along with several wartime hangars. A few wartime buildings appear to be in use to the east of Airport Road (SW 40th Avenue) which crosses thought the former station area. Outlines of other structures removed from the site are visible in aerial photography in otherwise grassy areas. Many streets remain along with the outline of the base parade ground and headquarters.

The former wartime airfield can be reached travelling southwest on U.S. Route 56 from Great Bend. The Northern Runway is used as a National Hot Rod Association drag strip, which was the original host of the U.S. Nationals event.

== World War II units assigned ==
- 19th Bombardment (Very Heavy) 1 August – 7 December 1944
- 44th Bombardment (Heavy) 25 July 1945
- 333rd Bombardment (Very Heavy) 13 January – 18 June 1945
- 444th Bombardment (Very Heavy) 29 July 1943 – 12 March 1944
- 489th Bombardment (Heavy) c. 18 February 1945
- 498th Bombardment (Very Heavy) 13 April – 13 July 1944

== See also ==
- Kansas World War II Army Airfields
- B-29 Superfortress Development
  - Pratt Army Air Field
  - Smoky Hill Army Air Field
  - Walker Army Air Field
