= 384th Fighter Squadron =

384th Fighter Squadron

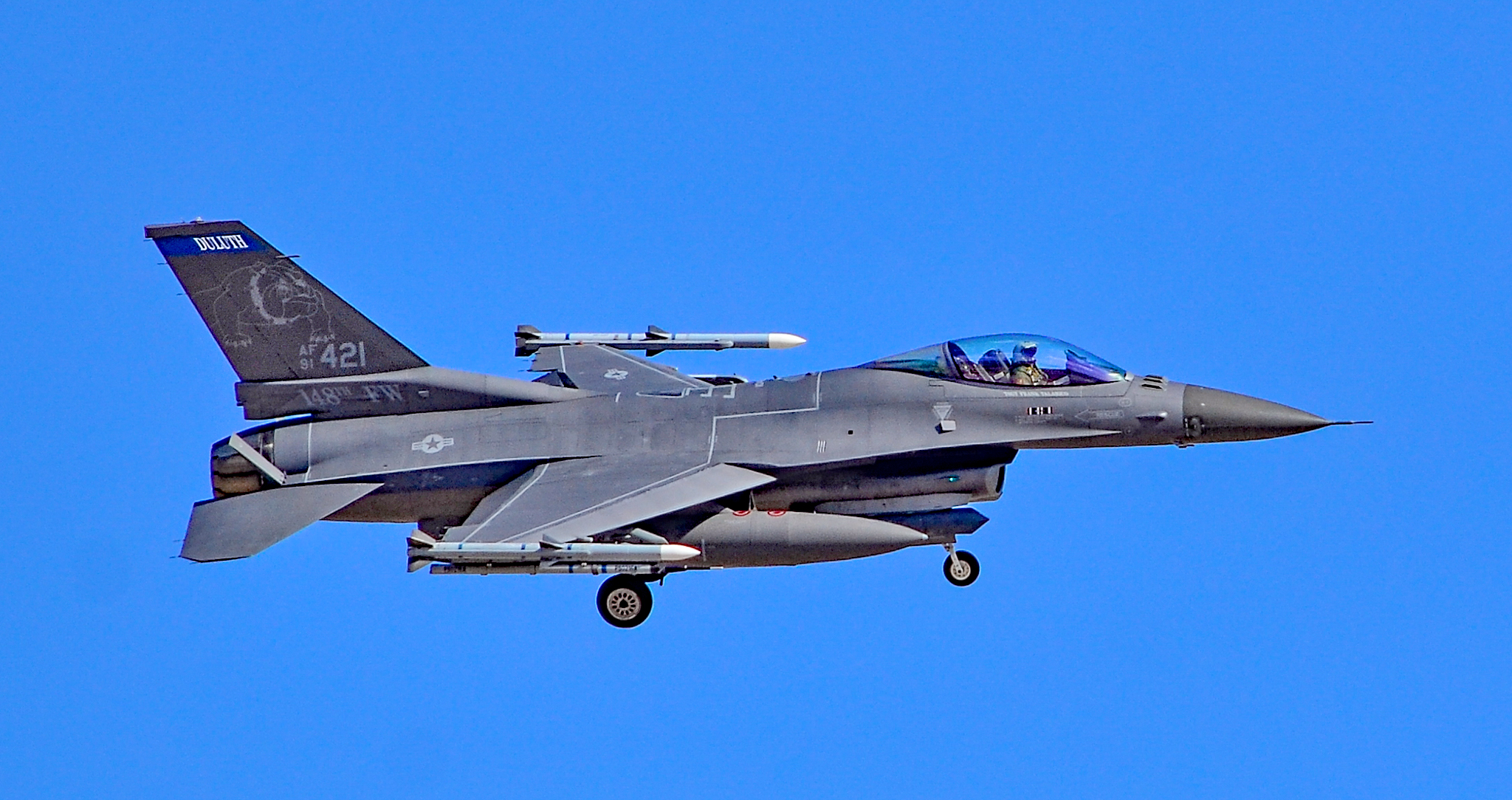
- F-16C Fighting Falcon of the 148th Fighter Wing (Note: Aircraft is General Dynamics F-16C Block 50D, serial 91-0421.)
- Active: 1943–1945; 2016–present
- Country: United States
- Branch: United States Air Force
- Role: Fighter
- Part of: Air Combat Command
- Engagements: European Theater of Operations
- Decorations: Distinguished Unit Citation

Insignia
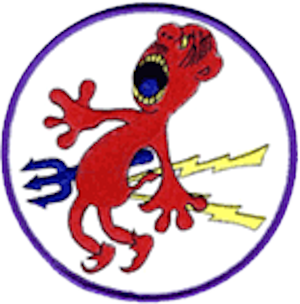
- 384th Fighter Squadron emblem (Note: Approved 15 February 1945. Description: on a white disc, border medium blue a caricatured, small, red devil with yellow eye and teeth, blue tongue, yelling in pain from impact of two, yellow, lightning flashes, edged black emanating from sinister chief and striking to seat, leaping toward dexter and dropping a medium blue, three tined pitchfork held in the right hand.)
- World War II fuselage code: 5Y

The 384th Fighter Squadron is an active United States Air Force unit assigned to the 495th Fighter Group. It is stationed at Duluth Air National Guard Base, Minnesota, where has been an active duty associate unit of the 179th Fighter Squadron since February 2016.

The squadron was first activated in 1943. After training in the United States, it deployed to the European Theater of Operations. It flew combat missions until 1945, earning a Distinguished Unit Citation for its actions on 27 December 1944, defending a heavy bomber formation during a raid on Frankfurt am Main. Following V-E Day, the squadron returned to the United States and was inactivated at Camp Kilmer, New Jersey, the port of embarkation.

== History ==
=== World War II ===
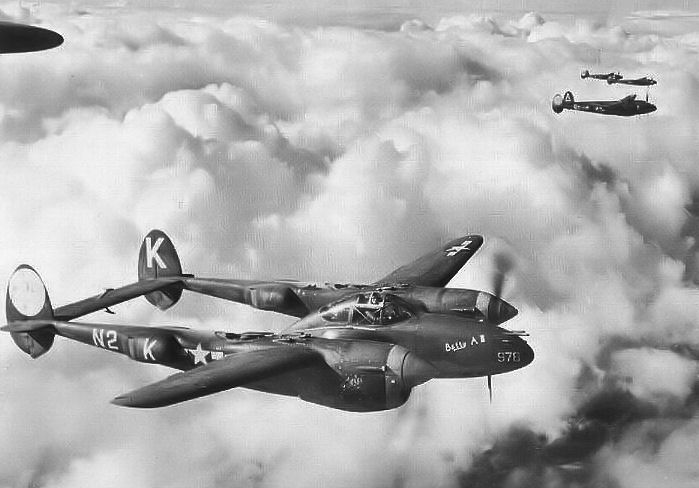
364th Group Lockheed P-38J Lightning (Note: Aircraft is Lockheed P-38J-10-LO Lightning, serial 42-67978, fuselage code N2-K, Betty A III (right side) Mim (left side) and flown by Lt. Loren R. Wilson. This plane was later transferred to 401st Fighter Squadron. It crashed near Rouffignac, France 28 August 1944. Baugher, Joe (8 September 2023). "1942 USAF Serial Numbers". Joe Baugher., Missing Air Crew Report 8490.)

The 384th Fighter Squadron was activated on 1 June 1943 at Grand Central Airport (California), California as one of the three original squadrons of the 364th Fighter Group, The squadron trained with Lockheed P-38 Lightnings at various bases in California through 1943, and departed for the European Theater of Operations in January 1944.

It arrived at its combat station, RAF Honington, England in February 1944, where it became part of VIII Fighter Command. The squadron flew its first mission with its Lightnings on 3 March 1944. However, during that month, engine problems plagued the group's P-38s, with 16 of them failing to return from missions during the month, including the group commander, Colonel Frederick C. Grambo, while he was flying an orientation mission with the 20th Fighter Group. While the squadron flew dive bombing, strafing and patrol missions in France, Belgium, the Netherlands and Germany, it initially operated primarily as an escort for Boeing B-17 Flying Fortress and Consolidated B-24 Liberator heavy bombers.

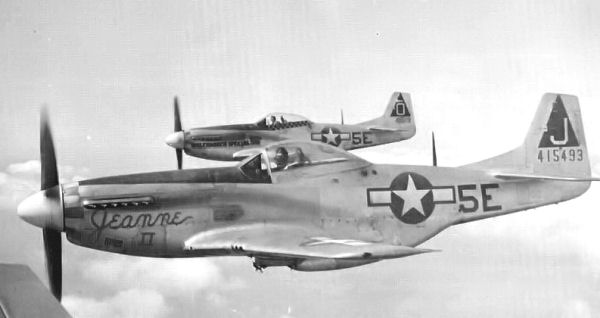
P-51 Mustangs of the 364th Fighter Group

It patrolled the English Channel during the D-Day landings in Normandy on 6 June 1944. While it continued flying bomber escort missions, it supported ground forces in France after the invasion by strafing and bombing locomotives, marshalling yards, bridges, barges and other targets. In July, it began to convert from its Lightnings to North American P-51 Mustangs, completing the switch in late July. The 364th Group had lost almost as many Lightnings as its claims of enemy aircraft destroyed, with the majority of the losses due to accidents and engine failure, not enemy action.

In the summer of 1944, and from then until the end of the war flew many long-range missions with its Mustangs, escorting heavy bombers that attacked oil refineries, industries and other strategic objectives in Berlin, Regensburg, Merseburg, Stuttgart, Brussels and elsewhere. During a raid on Frankfurt on 27 December 1944, the squadron dispersed a large group of Luftwaffe interceptors attacking the Martin B-26 Marauder formation the group was escorting. For this action, the unit was awarded the Distinguished Unit Citation.

In addition to its escort duties, the squadron also flew air sea rescue missions and carried out patrols. It continued to support ground forces as the battle line moved through France and into Germany. It participated in Operation Market Garden, the effort to secure a bridgehead across the Rhine, in September 1944, the Battle of the Bulge in December 1944 and January 1945, and Operation Lumberjack, the assault across the Rhine in Germany in March 1945. The squadron was credited with the destruction of 89 enemy aircraft during the war.

The squadron flew its last combat mission on 25 April 1945. Following V-E Day, the squadron remained at Honington, although many squadron members transferred to other units. In September, its remaining aircraft were transferred to depots. Its remaining personnel sailed for the United States on the RMS Queen Elizabeth, departing on 4 November. It arrived at the port of embarkation, Camp Kilmer, New Jersey on 9 November 1945 and was inactivated the following day.

=== Active associate unit ===
The squadron was again activated on 1 February 2016 and assigned to the 495th Fighter Group at Duluth Air National Guard Base, Minnesota. It is an active duty associate of the Minnesota Air National Guard's 179th Fighter Squadron, flying the 179th's General Dynamics F-16 Fighting Falcons.

== Lineage ==
- Constituted as the 384th Fighter Squadron (Twin Engine) on 25 May 1943

Activated on 1 June 1943
Redesignated 384th Fighter Squadron c. 28 July 1944
Inactivated on 10 November 1945

- Activated on 1 February 2016

=== Assignments ===
- 364th Fighter Group, 1 June 1943 – 10 November 1945.
- 495th Fighter Group, 1 February 2016 – present

=== Stations ===
- Glendale Airport, California, 1 June 1943
- Van Nuys Airport, California, 12 August 1943
- Ontario Army Air Field, California, 11 October 1943
- Santa Maria Army Air Field, California, c. 27 December 1943 – 14 January 1944
- RAF Honington (Sta 375), England, 10 February 1944-c. 4 November 1945
- Camp Kilmer, New Jersey, 9–10 November 1945
- Duluth Air National Guard Base, Minnesota, 1 February 2016 present

=== Aircraft ===
- Lockheed P-38 Lightning, 1943–1944
- North American P-51D Mustang, 1944–1945
- General Dynamics F-16 Fighting Falcon, 2016 – present

=== Awards and campaigns ===
Award streamer	Award	Dates	Notes
	Distinguished Unit Citation	27 December 1944	Germany

Campaign Streamer	Campaign	Dates	Notes
	Air Offensive, Europe	10 February 1944–5 June 1944	
	Air Combat, EAME Theater	10 February 1944–11 May 1945	
	Normandy	6 June 1944–24 July 1944	
	Northern France	25 July 1944–14 September 1944	
	Rhineland	15 September 1944–21 March 1945	
	Ardennes-Alsace	16 December 1944–25 January 1945	
	Central Europe	22 March 1944–21 May 1945	
