= RAF Honington =

Royal Air Force air combat support station in Suffolk, England

RAF Honington
- Near Thetford, Norfolk in England
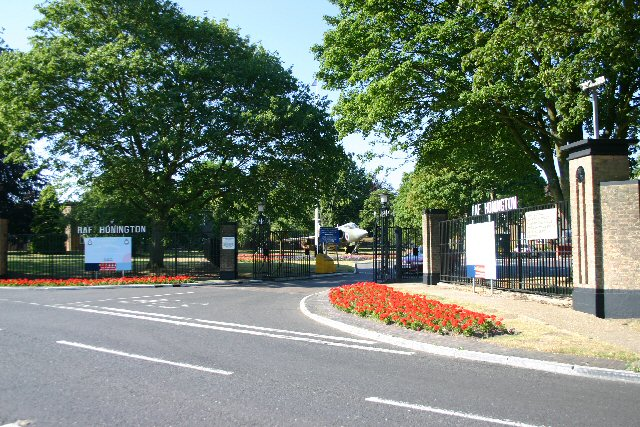
- The main entrance to RAF Honington.

- Pro anglia valens (Latin for 'Valiant for England')

Site information
- Type: Air combat support station
- Owner: Ministry of Defence
- Operator: Royal Air Force
- Controlled by: No. 2 Group (Air Combat Support)
- Condition: Operational
- Website: Official website

Location
- Shown within Suffolk
- Coordinates: 52°20′33″N 000°46′23″E
- Grid reference: TL890755
- Area: 779 hectares (1,920 acres)

Site history
- Built: 1935–1936
- In use: 1937–1942 (Royal Air Force); 1942–1946 (US Army Air Forces); 1946 – present (Royal Air Force)

Garrison information
- Current commander: Wing Commander Max Hayward
- Occupants: RAF Force Protection HQ; RAF Force Protection Centre; RAF Regiment Training Wing; No. 1 Squadron RAF Regiment; No. 15 Squadron RAF Regiment; No. 26 Squadron RAF Regiment; No. 2623 Squadron (RAuxAF Regiment); RAF Police HQ; No. 1 (Tactical) Police Squadron; No. 3 (Tactical) Police Squadron (RAuxAF); See Based units section for full list.

Airfield information
- Identifiers: IATA: BEQ, ICAO: EGXH, WMO: 03586
- Elevation: 53 metres (174 ft) AMSL
Runways
Direction	Length and surface
09/27	2,747 metres (9,012 ft) Asphalt

Royal Air Force Honington or more simply RAF Honington (IATA: BEQ, ICAO: EGXH) is a Royal Air Force station located 6 mi (9.7 km) south of Thetford near Ixworth in Suffolk, England. It was used as a bomber station during the Second World War and through the Cold War, hosting Handley Page Victors and Hawker Siddeley (Blackburn) Buccaneers. RAF Honington has been the RAF Regiment depot since 1994.

== History ==
=== Royal Air Force use ===
Construction of Honington airfield, which was undertaken by John Laing & Son, began in 1935, and the station was opened on 3 May 1937. Squadrons of RAF Bomber Command using the airfield prior to the Second World War were:

- No. 77 Squadron RAF (Hawker Harts and Vickers Wellesleys) (July 1937 – July 1938)
- No. 102 Squadron RAF (Handley Page Heyford) (July 1937 – July 1938) – Moved to RAF Driffield
- No. 75 Squadron RAF (Handley Page Harrow and Vickers Wellington) (July 1938 – July 1939) – Moved to RAF Stradishall.
- No. 215 Squadron RAF (Harrow and Wellington) (July 1938 – July 1938) – Moved to RAF Bassingbourn.
- IX Squadron (Wellington Mk Is, later changing to Mk lAs.) (4 September 1939 – 1940).

IX Squadron flew the first RAF bombing raid of the Second World War on 4 September 1939 flying a sortie against the Kriegsmarine in the Baltic resulting in the loss of two Wellingtons.

In July 1940, No. 311 (Czech) Squadron RAF formed at Honington with Wellingtons, later moving to RAF East Wretham in November 1940.

Then, in May 1941, a Wellington returning from a night trip attempted to land at Honington with its wheels retracted. It skidded to one side and crashed into the main bomb dump where it burst into flames. Group Captain J. A. Gray and Squadron Leader J. A. McCarthy, the station medical officer, were the first on the scene of the crash. Both entered the burning aircraft in an attempt to rescue the crew who were trapped and, between them, they saved two crew-members. For their gallantry, both officers were awarded the George Medal.

=== United States Army Air Forces use ===
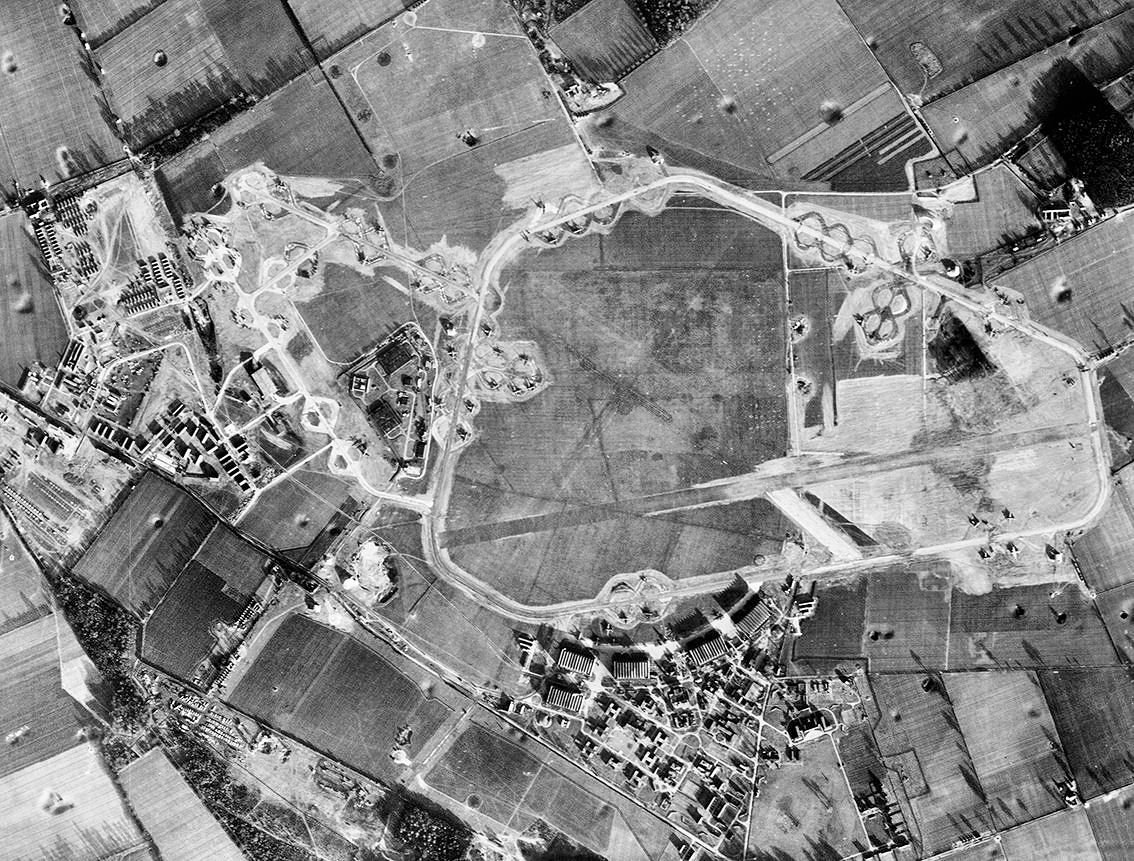
Aerial photography of RAF Honington, 25 January 1944 oriented north. The pre-World War II Honington Airfield is on the right, the 1st Strategic Air Depot is to the left. Note the large number of B-17 Flying Fortress aircraft parked on numerous hardstands at both the airfield and depot

In June 1942, the airfield was transferred to the USAAF and was upgraded to a Class A Bomber base. Honington was assigned USAAF designation Station 375.

- 314th Service Group

USAAF Station Units assigned to RAF Honington were:

467th Service Squadron; HHS 314th Service Group

- 18th Weather Squadron
- 68th Station Complement Squadron
- 9th Depot Repair Squadron
- Headquarters (Western Base Section)

Regular Army Station Units included:

- Headquarters & Headquarters Battery (386th Anti-Aircraft Artillery Battalion)
- 386th Anti-Aircraft Artillery AW Battalion
- 386th Anti-Aircraft Artillery Battalion
- 1097th Signal Company
- 1178th Quartermaster Company
- 1221st Military Police Company
- 1599th Ordnance Supply & Maintenance Company
- 2017th Engineer Fire Fighting Platoon

==== 1st Strategic Air Depot ====
Under USAAF control, an additional facility, called Troston, was constructed to the west of the main airfield as a specialized air depot for the repair of badly damaged B-17 Flying Fortress bombers and supporting the 3d Bomb Division located in the area. Badly damaged Fortresses were often instructed to crash land at Honington on return from operations, particularly if their landing gear could not be lowered, as this avoided the necessity to dismantle and transport the aircraft from its home base for repair.

==== 364th Fighter Group ====
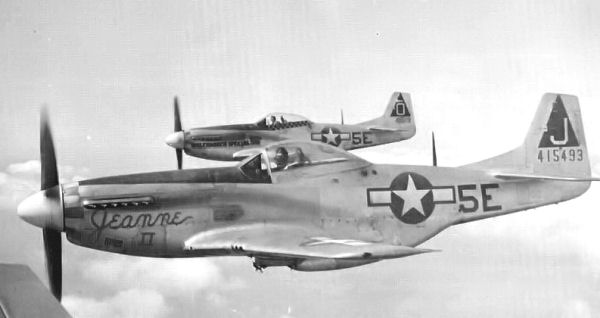
North American P-51D-15-NA Mustangs of the 385th Fighter Squadron. 44-15493 "Jeannie II" in foreground, 44-14322 "Coffin Wit Wings" behind

In addition to the air depot, Honington also housed an operational fighter unit when the 364th Fighter Group took up residence at Honington in February 1944, arriving from Santa Maria AAF, California. The group was under the command of the 67th Fighter Wing of the VIII Fighter Command.

The group consisted of the following squadrons:

- 383d Fighter Squadron (N2)
- 384th Fighter Squadron (5Y)
- 385th Fighter Squadron (5E)

The 364th FG flew escort, dive-bombing, strafing, and patrol missions in France, Belgium, the Netherlands, and Germany.

Converted from Lockheed P-38 Lightnings to North American P-51 Mustangs in the summer of 1944 and from then until the end of the war flew many long-range escort missions heavy bombers that attacked oil refineries, industries, and other strategic objectives at Berlin, Regensburg, Merseburg, Stuttgart, Brussels, and elsewhere. The 364th received a Distinguished Unit Citation for an escort mission on 27 December 1944 when the group dispersed a large force of German fighters that attacked the bomber formation the group was escorting on a raid to Frankfurt.

The group patrolled the English Channel during the Normandy invasion in June 1944, and, while continuing escort operations, supported ground forces in France after the invasion by strafing and bombing locomotives, marshalling yards, bridges, barges, and other targets.

The 364th also flew air-sea rescue missions, engaged in patrol activities, and continued to support ground forces as the battle line moved through France and into Germany. Took part in the effort to invade the Netherlands by air, September 1944; the Battle of the Bulge, December 1944 – January 1945; and the assault across the Rhine, March 1945.

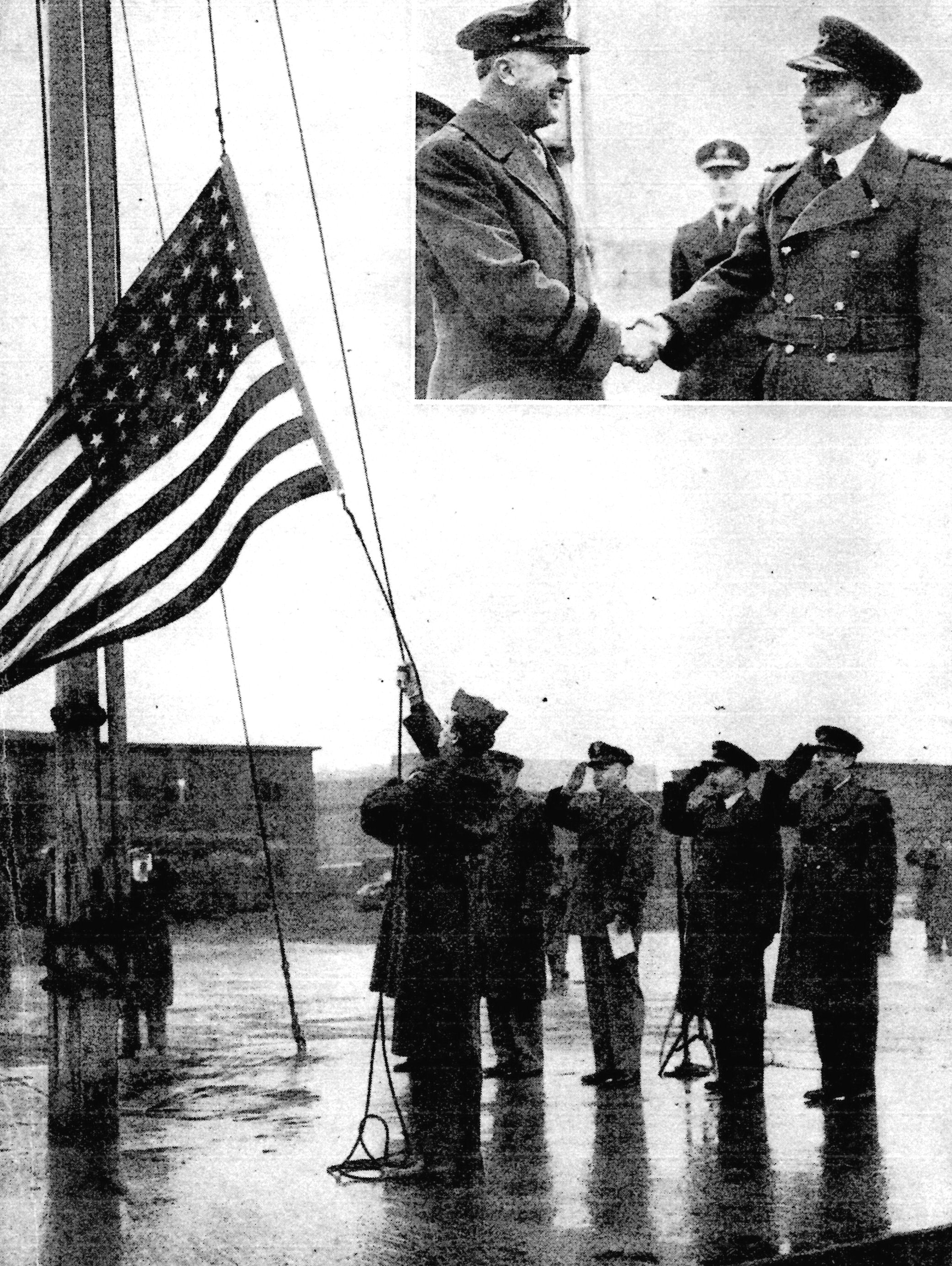
The US flag comes down for the last time at RAF Honington in February 1946

Although the last mission by the 364th took place on 25 April 1945, the group did not depart until November, returning to Camp Kilmer, New Jersey, for inactivation. Even then, Honington remained the lone Eighth Air Force outpost in the UK becoming Fighter Command HQ on 5 October. Honington was the last USAAF station to be returned to the RAF. By the beginning of 1946, the airfield remained the only active station which had been used by the Eighth Air Force and a fitting ceremony was planned to mark its closure and official handing back to the Royal Air Force. On 26 February, Brigadier General Emil Kiel – the Eighth Fighter Command commander – was present to hand over the keys of the station to Air Marshal Sir James Robb, AOC RAF Fighter Command. An RAF band played The Star-Spangled Banner as the Stars and Stripes were lowered for the RAF Ensign to be hoisted in its place. The airfield, which was the first transferred to the United States Army Air Forces for its use in 1942, was the last to be returned to the Air Ministry.

=== Back to Royal Air Force control ===
RAF Honington was then used by RAF Transport Command. The station provided support the Berlin Airlift and was transferred to RAF Bomber Command in 1949. It accommodated storage facilities for No. 94 Armament Maintenance Unit in the 1950s and a 9,000 ft concrete runway was completed in 1956.

Bomber squadrons, 10, XV, 44, and 57 flying the English Electric Canberra were based at the station from 1955 to 1957 and 10 and XV Squadrons saw action in the Suez Crisis.

In 1956, RAF Honington also became a V bomber base: squadrons, Nos, 7, 90, and 199 flew Vickers Valiant while squadron Nos, 55 and 57 flew Handley Page Victors.

In 1965 the station was put into reserve to accommodate the proposed General Dynamics F-111 fleet: the married quarters were used for evacuees from the Aden Emergency at that time.

The station then became home to Hawker Siddeley (Blackburn) Buccaneer bombers from November 1969. Squadron Nos. 12, 15 and 16 were formed. 15 and 16 squadrons moved to RAF Laarbruch in West Germany in 1971. No. 237 OCU (Operational Conversion Unit) was formed at Honington when the RAF took over Buccaneer training from the Royal Navy. 208 and 216 squadrons were also based there. The Buccaneer fleet (12, 208, and 237 OCU) moved to RAF Lossiemouth in Scotland.

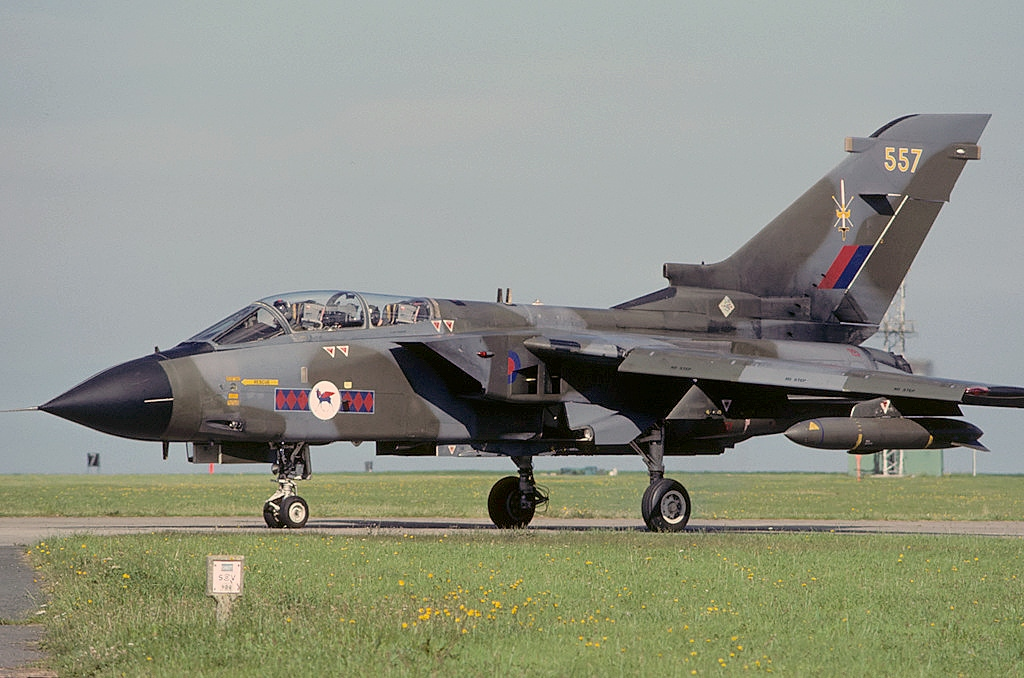
A Panavia Tornado GR1 of No. 45 Squadron otherwise known as the Tornado Weapons Conversion Unit.

The station was then selected to become a base for the RAF's Panavia Tornado fleet in 1981. In August 1982 IX(B) Squadron was reformed at RAF Honington, becoming the world's first operational Tornado squadron. Equipment included the WE.177 nuclear bomb. IX Squadron relocated to RAF Bruggen in Germany in 1986. No. 45 Squadron was the sole occupant until XIII Squadron formed there in January 1990.

=== RAF Regiment Depot ===
On 15 July 1992, it was announced that the Tornados would depart Honington and that the station would relinquish its primary flying role and become the RAF Regiment Depot. As a result, the TWCU moved to Lossiemouth (to replace the Buccaneers) in November 1993. Honington ceased to be a flying station on 1 February 1994 when No. 13 Squadron relocated to RAF Marham. The Depot moved in June 1994, when RAF Catterick in North Yorkshire, home of the previous depot, transferred to the British Army.

RAF Honington became the home to 611 Volunteer Gliding Squadron due to the closure of RAF Watton in April 2012, requiring their conversion to the Grob 109B Vigilant motor glider until the closure of that unit in 2016.

During 2018, No. 2 Squadron RAF Regiment moved to RAF Brize Norton in Oxfordshire, completing the move in September of that year. No. 20 Wing RAF Regiment (Defence Chemical, Biological, Radiological and Nuclear (CBRN) Wing) disbanded on 1 April 2019 having been at Honington since 2011. The CBRN role was taken over by 28 Engineer Regiment of the Royal Engineers, with No. 27 Squadron RAF Regiment coming under army command, before disbanding in October 2021.

== Role and operations ==
RAF Honington's mission statement is "Delivering Air Force Protection Capability for the RAF and Defence". The station is the single hub for RAF Force Protection, incorporating the RAF Regiment Headquarters and the RAF Police Headquarters. Together they are responsible for protecting the RAF at home and abroad. The station is home to over 1,500 military personnel, civil servants and contractors. RAF Honington is home to three RAF Regiment field squadrons. Through the RAF Force Protection Centre and RAF Regiment Training Wing, the station also provides initial and advanced training for members of the RAF Regiment and specialist training for the RAF's entire Force Protection capability. The RAF Police is the service police branch of the Royal Air Force and Honington is home to the RAF Police Headquarters. It also accommodates No. 1 (Tactical) Police Squadron which provides field policing, and reserve unit No. 3 (Tactical) Police Squadron (Royal Auxiliary Air Force) which provides a general policing and aviation security capability.

== Based units ==
The following units are based at RAF Honington.

=== Royal Air Force ===
No. 2 Group (Air Combat Support)

- Air Security Force
  - Headquarters Air Security Force
  - No. 1 RAF Police & Security Wing
    - Headquarters No. 1 RAF Police & Security Wing
    - No. 3 (Tactical) Police Squadron (Royal Auxiliary Air Force)
    - Counter Intelligence and Security Squadron
  - RAF Police Headquarters
- Combat and Readiness Force
  - Headquarters Combat and Readiness Force
  - No. 7 Force Protection Wing
    - No. 1 Squadron RAF Regiment
    - No. 2623 (East Anglian) Squadron (Royal Auxiliary Air Force) Regiment
  - RAF Regiment Training Wing
  - RAF Force Protection Centre

No. 22 Group (Training)

- No. 2 Flying Training School
  - No. 611 Volunteer Gliding Squadron – Grob Viking T1

=== British Army ===
Royal Engineers

- 8th Engineer Brigade
  - 29th (Explosive Ordnance Disposal and Search) Group
    - 28 Engineer Regiment
      - 64 Headquarters & Support Squadron (C-CBRN)

=== Strategic Command ===
Defence Medical Services

- Honington Regional Rehabilitation Unit

=== Civilian ===
- RAF Regiment Heritage Centre
- RAF Honington History Rooms
- RAF Honington Flying Club – Piper PA-28

== Heritage ==
=== Station badge and motto ===
RAF Honington's badge, awarded in June 1956, features the head of St. Edmund in front of two crossed arrows pointing downwards. The head of St. Edmund represents the nearby town of Bury St Edmunds which is approximately 9 km (5.59 mi) to the south east of the station, in whose coat of arms the representation is featured. The arrows in saltire, represent St. Edmund's martyrdom.

The station's motto (Pro anglia valens) is in Latin and translates into English as Valiant for England.

=== Built heritage ===
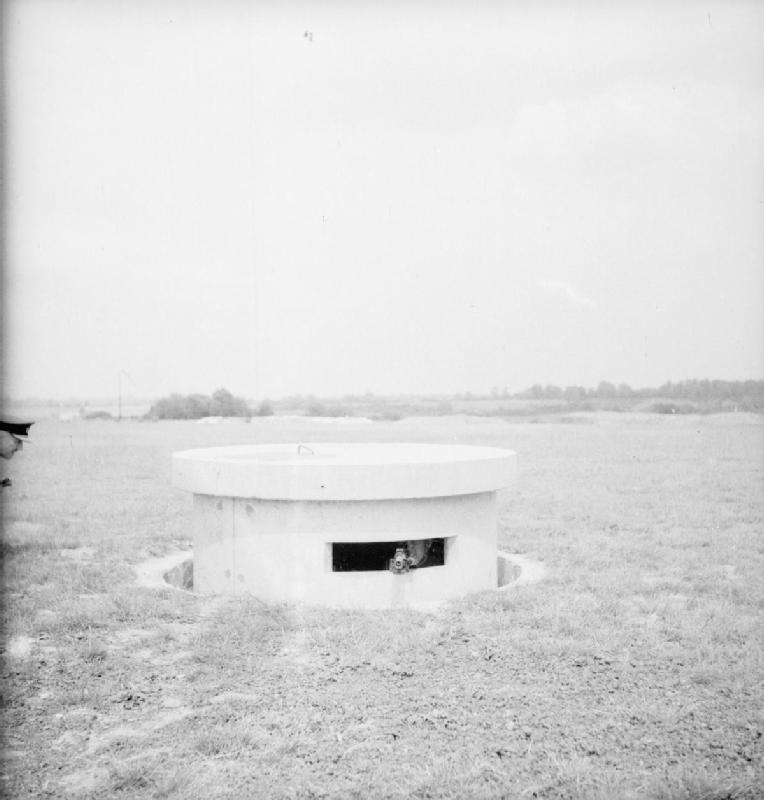
The turret of a Pickett-Hamilton fort, fully raised and manned during the Second World War.

Two Second World War era hardened field fortifications survive within the airfield boundary. The Pickett-Hamilton forts were designated as scheduled monuments by English Heritage (now Historic England) in September 2002. The forts were constructed in late 1940 in order to provide ground defence for the airfield. A third example is thought to have been destroyed during redevelopment of the station after the war.

The forts were designed to be lowered into the ground while not in use; as such they would be inconspicuous and would not interfere with the passage of taxiing aircraft or vehicles. The forts could be raised to about 2 feet 6 inches (0.76 m) above ground level where each would pose a physical impediment to aircraft and vehicles and from where a small crew could fire rifles or light machine guns.

The examples at Honington are described by Historic England as having "importance as comparatively rare surviving examples of an unusual and innovative type of airfield defence installation. The outer structure and lifting heads of both remain in good condition, and the example which is in working order, with its principal internal fittings intact, is of particular interest."

== Former units ==
The following units were here at some point:

- No. 1 Transport Aircraft Modification Unit RAF
- No. 3 Group Practice Flight RAF (1937)
- No. 5 Blind Approach Training Flight RAF
- No. 13 Blind Approach Training Flight RAF
- No. 58 Maintenance Unit RAF
- No. 103 Gliding School RAF
- No. 237 Operational Conversion Unit RAF
- No. 611 Volunteer Gliding Squadron RAF
- No. 1504 (Beam Approach Training) Flight RAF
- No. 1505 (Beam Approach Training) Flight RAF
- No. 1513 (Beam Approach Training) Flight RAF
- Avionic Development and Servicing Unit (Buccaneer) RAF
- Joint Rapier Training Unit RAF
- Rapier Training Unit RAF
- Strike Command Avionics Development and Servicing Unit RAF
- Strike Command Buccaneer Force RAF
- Tornado Weapons Conversion Unit RAF
- Transport Command Major Servicing Unit RAF
- Transport Command Signals Training Unit RAF

== See also ==
- List of Royal Air Force stations
