= 131st Operations Group =

Missouri Air National Guard unit

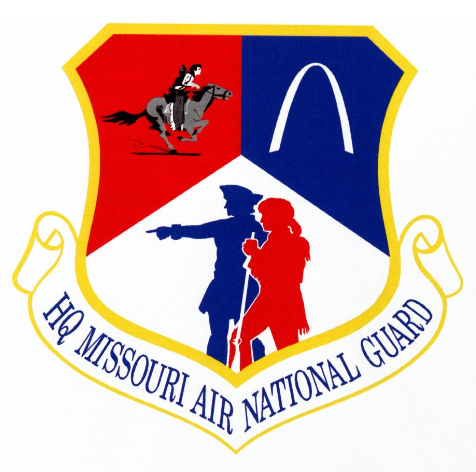
131st Operations Group

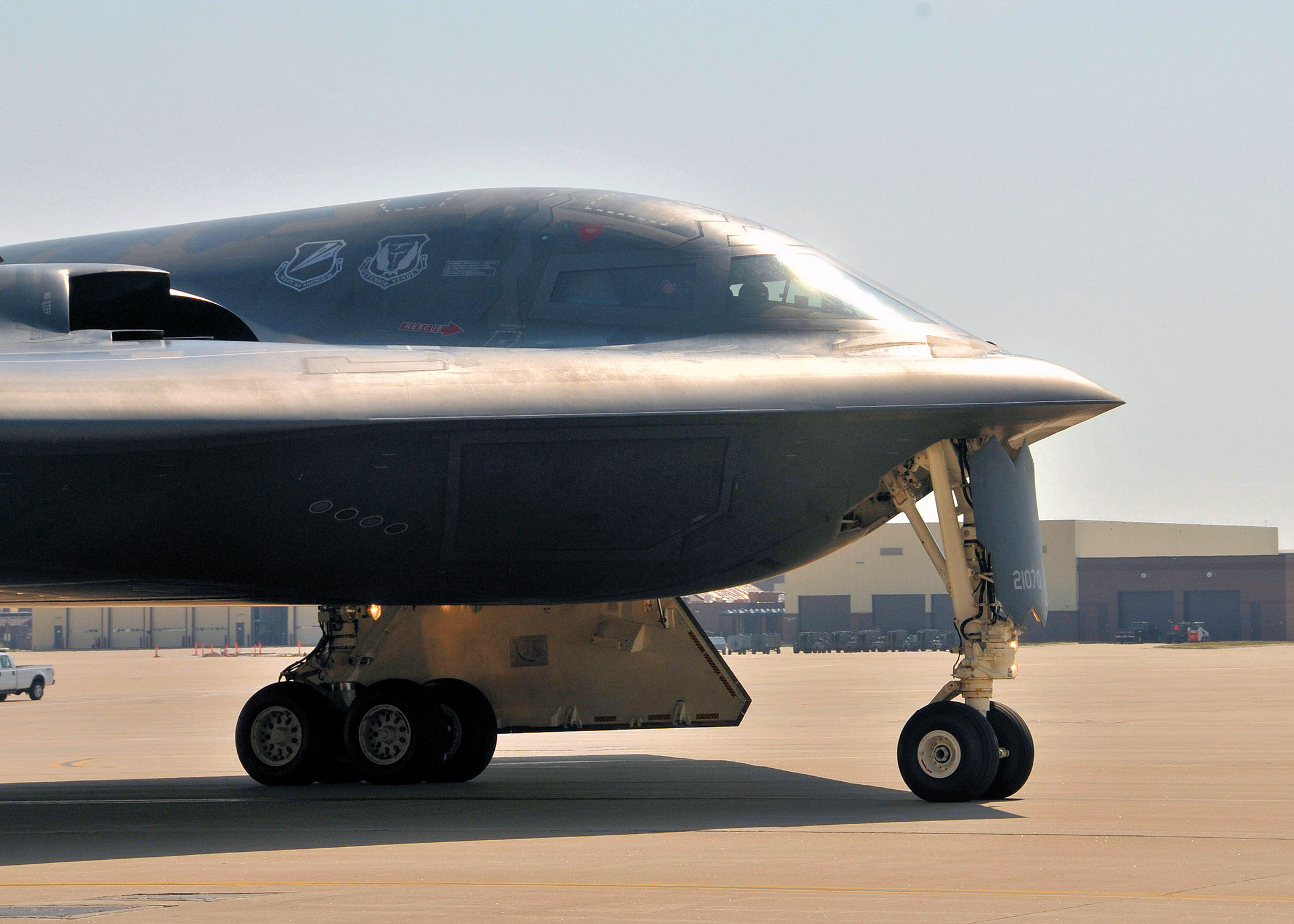
- The B-2 "Spirit of Ohio" returns from a training mission, 27 June 2012 (Note: Aircraft is Northrop B-2A Block 10 Spirit, serial 82-1070, Spirit of Ohio. It was upgraded to Block 30 in 1999. Earlier named Fire and Ice. The B-2 airframe in the National Museum of the United States Air Force carries this plane's tail number as well. Baugher, Joe (19 August 2023). "1982 USAF Serial Numbers". Joe Baugher.)
- Active: 1943–1945; 1946–1952; 1952–1958; 1962–1974; 1993–present
- Country: United States
- Allegiance: Missouri
- Branch: Air National Guard
- Role: strategic bomber
- Part of: Missouri Air National Guard
- Garrison/HQ: Whiteman Air Force Base, Missouri
- Motto: Parati ad Agendum (Latin for 'Ready for Action')
- Engagements: World War II; Operation Northern Watch; Operation Odyssey Dawn
- Decorations: Distinguished Unit Citation; Air Force Outstanding Unit Award
- Battle honours: European Theater of Operations

Insignia
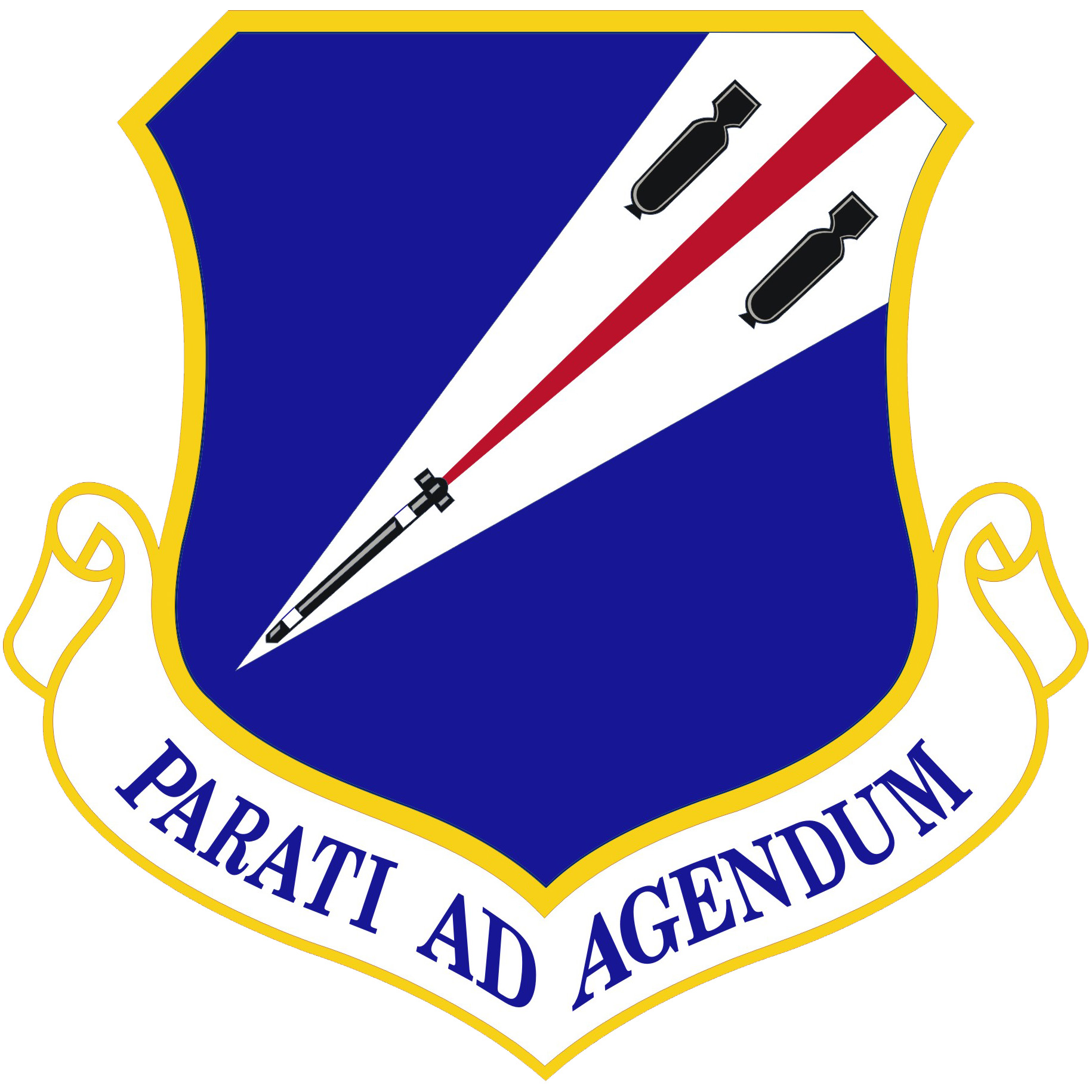
- 131st Operations Group emblem (Note: The group uses the wing emblem with the group designation on the scroll. Air Force Instruction 84–105, Organizational Lineage, Honors and Heraldry, 19 March 2013, para 3.3.3.)

== Mission ==
The mission of the 131st Operations Group, 131st Bomb Wing, is to provide expeditionary, B-2 global strike combat support capabilities to geographic commanders and Commander, United States Strategic Command. This is done by training and equipping airmen to fly the aircraft of the 509th Bomb Wing. The group also organizes, trains, and prepares a force of citizen airmen to defend and serve the people of Missouri.

== Units ==
- 110th Bomb Squadron
- 110th Operations Support Flight

== History ==
=== World War II ===
The group was activated as the 364th Fighter Group on 1 June 1943 at Grand Central Airport (California), with the 383rd, 384th and 385th Fighter Squadrons assigned. The group trained with Lockheed P-38 Lightnings in California through 1943 with each squadron flying from a different station. The group assembled at Santa Maria Army Air Field, California in December, and departed for the European Theater of Operations in January 1944.

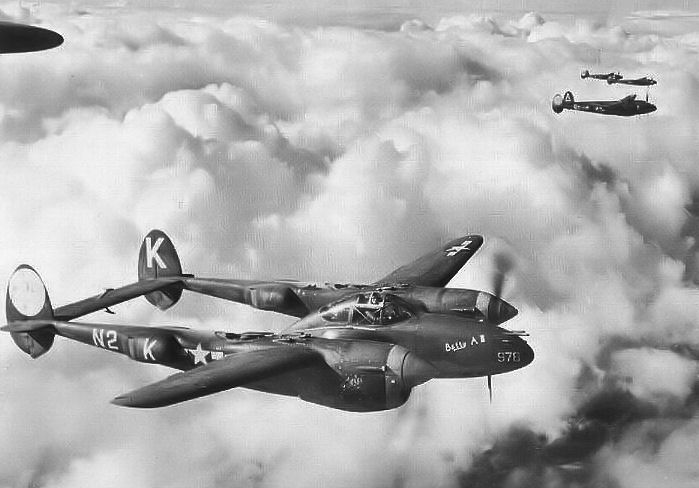
P-38J Lightnings including "Mim / Betty A II" of the 364th Fighter Group (Note: Aircraft is Lockheed P-38J-10-LO Lightning, serial 42-67978 Mim (right side)/ Betty A II (left side), fuselage code N2-K of Lt. Loren R. Wilson.)

It arrived at its combat station, RAF Honington, England in February 1944, where it became part of VIII Fighter Command. The group flew its first mission with its Lightnings on 3 March 1944. However, during that month, engine problems plagued the group's P-38s, with 16 of them failing to return from missions during the month, including the group commander, Colonel Frederick C. Grambo, while he was flying an orientation mission with the 20th Fighter Group. While the group flew dive bombing, strafing and patrol missions in France, Belgium, the Netherlands and Germany, it initially operated primarily as an escort for Boeing B-17 Flying Fortress and Consolidated B-24 Liberator heavy bombers.

It patrolled the English Channel during the D-Day landings in Normandy on 6 June 1944. While it continued flying bomber escort missions, it supported ground forces in France after the invasion by strafing and bombing locomotives, marshalling yards, bridges, barges and other targets. In July, it began to convert from its Lightnings to North American P-51 Mustangs, completing the switch in late July. The 364th Group had lost almost as many Lightnings as its claims of enemy aircraft destroyed, with the majority of the losses due to accidents and engine failure, not enemy action.

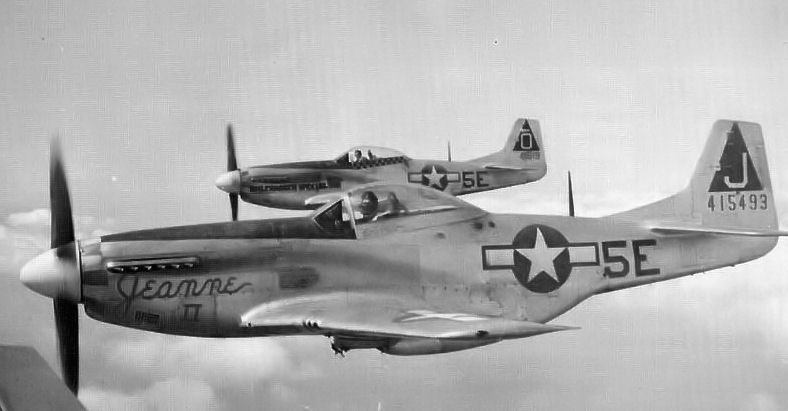
P-51D and P-51K Mustangs of the 385th Fighter Squadron (Note: Aircraft are North American P-51D-15-NA Mustang, serial 44-15493 Jeanne II (5E-J), which was flown by Capt. Gerald W "Jerry" Fine and was named for his wife, and P-51K-5-NT Mustang, serial 44-11619 Boilermaker Special (5E-O-), which was flown by Lt. Robert W. Boydston.)

In the summer of 1944, and from then until the end of the war it flew many long-range missions with its Mustangs, escorting heavy bombers that attacked oil refineries, industries and other strategic objectives in Berlin, Regensburg, Merseburg, Stuttgart, Brussels and elsewhere. During a raid on Frankfurt on 27 December 1944, the group dispersed a large group of Luftwaffe interceptors attacking the Martin B-26 Marauder formation the group was escorting. For this action, the unit was awarded the Distinguished Unit Citation.

In addition to its escort duties, the group also flew air sea rescue missions and carried out patrols. It continued to support ground forces as the battle line moved through France and into Germany. It participated in Operation Market Garden, the effort to secure a bridgehead across the Rhine, in September 1944; the Battle of the Bulge in December 1944 and January 1945; and Operation Lumberjack, the assault across the Rhine in Germany in March 1945. The group was credited with the destruction of 263 enemy aircraft during the war. On 27 December Capt Ernest E. Bankey, Jr. became and "ace in a day' when he destroyed five German aircraft. (Note: Fractional credit is for a victory shared with a member of another unit. Freeman credits the group with 256.5 victories.)

The squadron flew its last combat mission on 25 April 1945. Following V-E Day, the squadron remained at Honington, although many squadron members transferred to other units. In September, its remaining aircraft were transferred to depots. Its remaining personnel sailed for the United States on the RMS Queen Elizabeth, departing on 4 November. It arrived at the port of embarkation, Camp Kilmer, New Jersey on 9 November 1945 and was inactivated the following day.

364th Ftr Gp

Aerial Victories	Number	Note
Group Hq	9.5
383d Fighter Squadron	76
384th Fighter Squadron	89
385th Fighter Squadron	88.5
Group Total	263

=== Missouri Air National Guard ===
The wartime 364th Fighter Group was allotted to the National Guard as the 131st Fighter Group on 24 May 1946. It was organized at Lambert Field, near St Louis, Missouri and was extended federal recognition on 15 July 1946. Assigned to the Missouri National Guard's 57th Fighter Wing, the 131st Group controlled the 110th Fighter Squadron in St. Louis and the 180th Bombardment Squadron at Rosecrans Memorial Airport, St Joseph. On 1 November 1950 the 71st Fighter Wing was inactivated and its personnel and equipment were assigned to the new 131st Composite Wing when Continental Air Command reorganized its combat units under the Wing Base organization. The 131st Wing has been the group's parent ever since.

==== Korean War activation ====
On 1 March 1951 the 131st was federalized and brought to active duty due to the Korean War. It initially transferred to Bergstrom Air Force Base, Texas as the 131st Fighter-Bomber Group was composed of the 110th Fighter Squadron, the 170th Fighter-Bomber Squadron (Illinois ANG) and the 192d Fighter-Bomber Squadron (Nevada ANG).

In November when the group was transferred to Tactical Air Command (TAC) and moved to George Air Force Base, California. At George, the unit trained for deployment overseas. On 1 December 1952, its period of federal service terminated and the group was relieved from active duty and returned to the Missouri Air National Guard, while its personnel and equipment at George were transferred to the 479th Fighter-Bomber Group.

==== Tactical Air Command ====
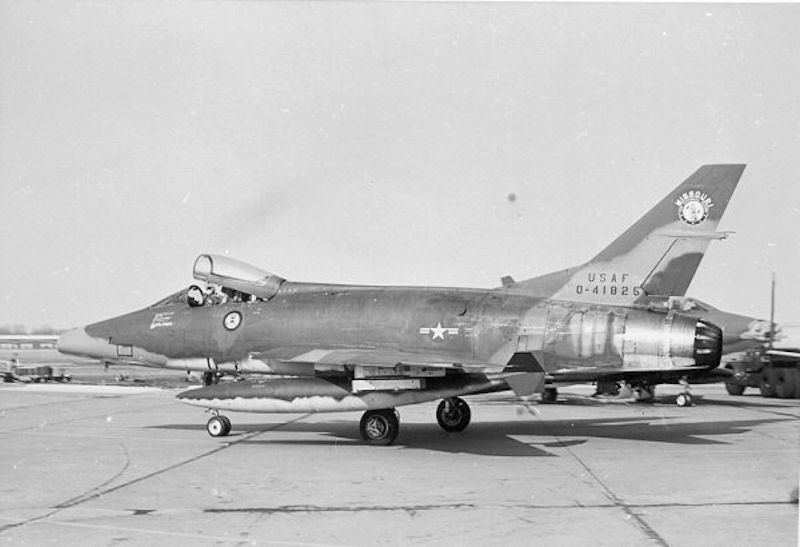
110th TFS F-100C 54-1825, about 1965

Returning to Lambert Field, the 131st became a light bombardment group and came under TAC for mobilization. It received Douglas B-26 Invaders that returned from the Korean War and trained primarily in night bombardment missions. With the retirement of the B-26 in 1957, the 131st entered the "Jet Age." It received its first jet aircraft in the spring of 1957 when it received some Lockheed F-80 Shooting Stars, then in June 1957, with a mission of air defense. The group was inactivated in November 1958.

After the 131st Wing returned to St. Louis after mobilization for the Berlin Crisis of 1961, the group was reactivated as the 131st Tactical Fighter Group and equipped with North American F-100C Super Sabres in late 1962. Although not activated during the Vietnam War, many of the group's pilots were sent to F-100 squadrons in South Vietnam between 1968 and 1971. The group was again inactivated in 1974, when Air National Guard tactical groups on the same base as their parent wings were discontinued and their squadrons assigned directly to the wing.

==== Air Combat Command ====
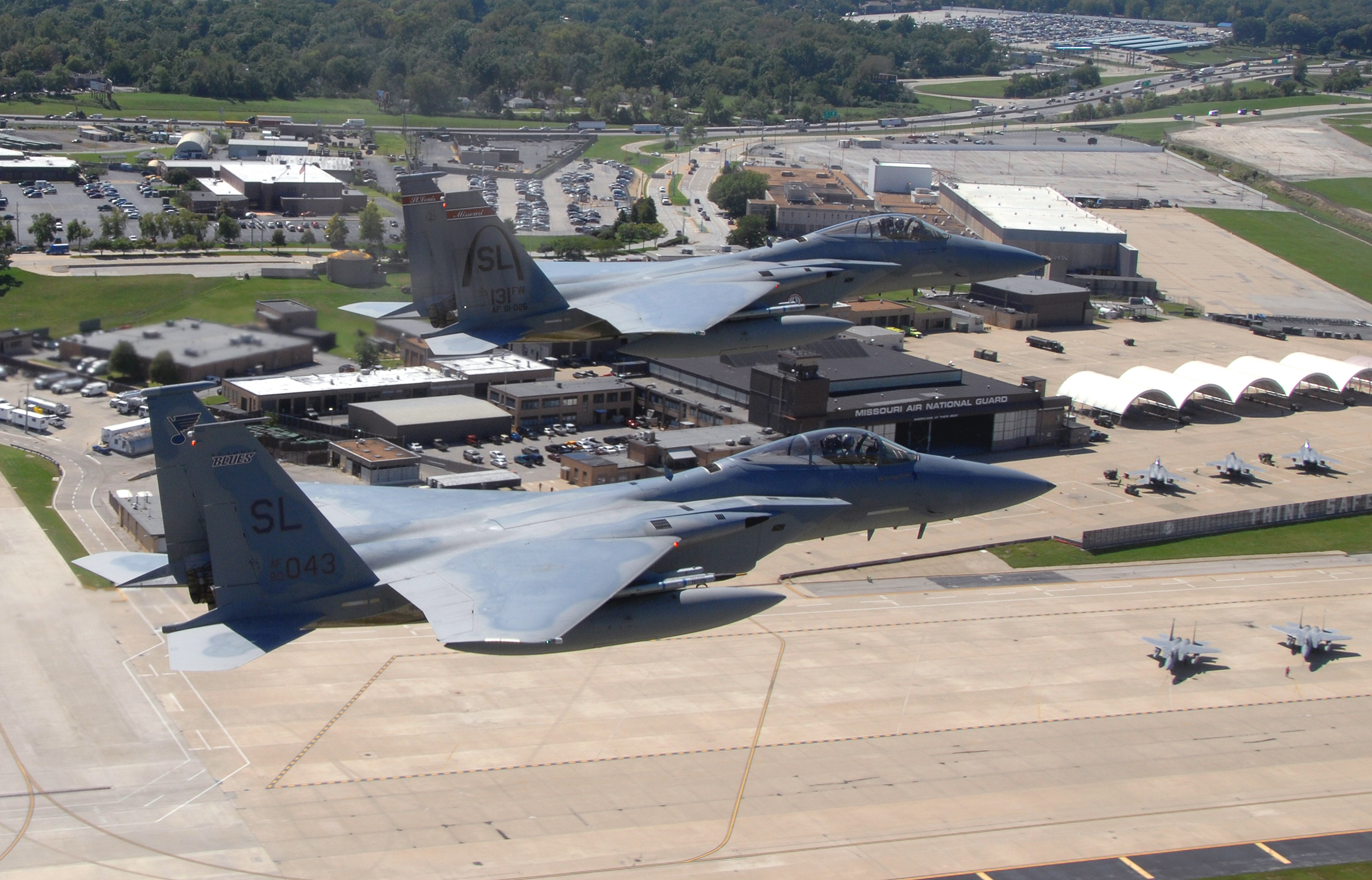
110th FS F-15Cs St Louis 2008

The Air Force again reorganized under the Objective Wing model and in 1993, the group again activated as the 131st Operations Group. Members were called into service to battle the Great Flood of 1993. In the post-Cold War era, the unit deployed to Incirlik Air Base, Turkey in support of Operation Northern Watch in 1996, 1997 and 1998.

On 16 March 2006, the Air Force announced that elements of the group would become an associate unit of the active duty 509th Bomb Wing at Whiteman Air Force Base. Consequently, the group transitioned from flying and maintaining the F-15C Eagle fighter to the Northrop Grumman B-2 Spirit bomber. The final flight of the F-15C Eagle by the 131st occurred in June 2009. The 509th and the 131st joined forces according to what is known as a "classic associate wing" structure. As a result, active duty and Air National Guard pilots and maintainers fly B-2 missions and sustain the aircraft as though they were one unit.

==== Global Strike Command ====
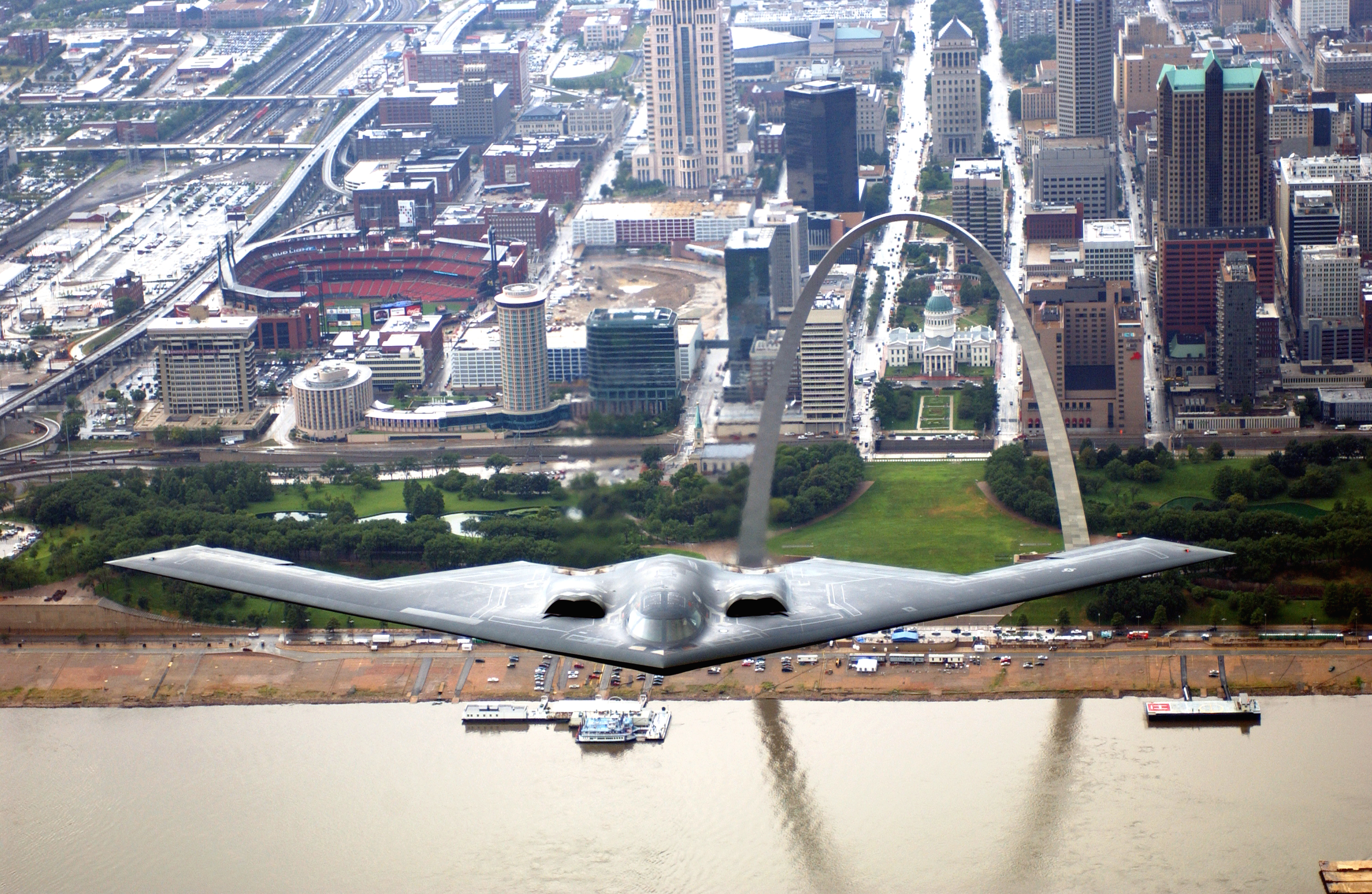
B-2 Spirit from Whiteman Air Force Base over St. Louis, the former home of the 131st Bomb Wing.

The 131st Bomb Wing's transition to Air Force Global Strike Command occurred on 4 October 2008 when the 131st Bomb Wing held a ribbon-cutting ceremony at Whiteman. The ceremony celebrated the first official drill for traditional guardsmen at Whiteman and the grand opening of building 3006, the 131st Bomb Wing's first headquarters there. On 16 June 2009, the last F-15 departed Lambert Field. In August 2013, the 131st Bomb Wing was deemed fully mission-capable, meaning that it fully completed the transition to Whiteman Air Force Base.

== Lineage ==
- Constituted as the 364th Fighter Group on 25 May 1943

Activated on 1 June 1943
Inactivated on 10 November 1945

- Redesignated 131st Fighter Group and allotted to the Air National Guard on 24 May 1946

Federal recognition on 15 July 1946
Redesignated 131st Composite Group on 1 November 1950
Redesignated: 131st Fighter Group on 1 February 1951
Called to active duty on 1 March 1951
Redesignated 131st Fighter-Bomber Group on 9 April 1951
Inactivated and returned to Missouri state control, 1 December 1952
Redesignated 131st Bombardment Group, Light on 1 December 1952
Redesignated 131st Bombardment Group, Tactical in 1955
Redesignated 131st Fighter-Interceptor Group on 15 June 1957
Inactivated 1 November 1958

- Redesignated 131st Tactical Fighter Group

Activated 1 August 1962
Inactivated 30 September 1974
Redesignated 131st Operations Group
Activated 1 January 1993

=== Assignments ===
- IV Fighter Command, 1 June 1943 – 11 January 1944
- 67th Fighter Wing, 10 February 1944 (attached to: 1st Bombardment Division (later 1st Air Division), 15 September 1943 – 3 November 1945
- Army Service Forces, 9–10 November 1945
- 66th Fighter Wing, 15 July 1946
- 71st Fighter Wing, 1 January 1947
- 131st Composite Wing (later 131st Fighter Wing, 131st Fighter-Bomber Wing), 1 November 1951 – 1 December 1952
- 131st Bombardment Wing (later 131st Fighter-Interceptor Wing), 1 December 1952 – 1 November 1958
- 131st Tactical Fighter Wing, 1 October 1962 – 30 September 1974
- 131st Fighter Wing (later 131st Bomb Wing), 1 January 1993 – present

=== Components ===
- 110th Fighter Squadron (later 110th Fighter-Bomber Squadron, 110th Tactical Fighter Squadron, 110th Fighter Squadron, 110th Bomb Squadron), 23 September 1946 – 1 November 1952, 1 November 1952 – 1 November 1958, 1 October 1962 – 30 September 1974, 1 January 1993 – present
- 122d Bombardment Squadron, 1 January 1953 – 15 June 1957

New Orleans Lakefront Airport

- 169th Tactical Fighter Squadron, 1 August 1962 – 15 October 1962

Greater Peoria Airport

- 170th Fighter-Bomber Squadron (later 170th Tactical Fighter Squadron), 1 February 1951 – 1 December 1952, 1 August 1962 – 15 October 1962
- 180th Bombardment Squadron, 1 November 1950 – 1 February 1951; 1 January 1953 – 10 April 1958

Rosecrans Memorial Airport

- 192d Fighter-Bomber Squadron, 1 February 1951 – 1 September 1952
- 383d Fighter Squadron: 1 June 1943 – 10 November 1945
- 384th Fighter Squadron: 1 June 1943 – 10 November 1945
- 385th Fighter Squadron: 1 June 1943 – 10 November 1945

=== Stations ===
- Glendale Airport, California, 1 June 1943
- Van Nuys Airport, California, 12 August 1943
- Ontario Army Airfield, California, 11 October 1943
- Santa Maria Army Air Field, California, c. 7 December 1943 – c. 11 January 1944
- RAF Honington (AAF-375), England, February 1944 – c. November 1945
- Camp Kilmer, New Jersey, 9–10 November 1945
- Lambert Field, Missouri, 15 July 1946

Bergstrom Air Force Base, Texas, 1 March 1951
George Air Force Base, California, July 1951 – 1 December 1952

- Lambert Field, Missouri, 1 December 1952 – 1 November 1958
- Robertson Air National Guard Base, Missouri, 1 January 1993
- Whiteman Air Force Base, Missouri, 4 Oct 2008 – present

=== Aircraft ===
- Lockheed P-38J Lightning. 1943–1944
- North American P-51D (later F-51D) Mustang, 1944–1945, 1946–1952
- North American P-51K Mustang, 1944–1945
- Douglas B-26 Invader, 1946–1957
- Lockheed F-80 Shooting Star, 1957
- Republic F-84 Thunderjet, 1957–1958
- Republic F-84F Thunderstreak, 1957–1958
- North American F-100C Super Sabre, 1962–1971
- North American F-100D Super Sabre, 1971–1974
- North American F-100F Super Sabre, 1962–1974
- McDonnell Douglas F-15A Eagle, 1993–2004
- McDonnell Douglas F-15B Eagle, 1993–2004
- McDonnell Douglas F-15C Eagle, 2004–2009
- McDonnell Douglas F-15D Eagle, 2004–2009
- Northrop Grumman B-2 Spirit, 2009–present
