= 385th Fighter Squadron =

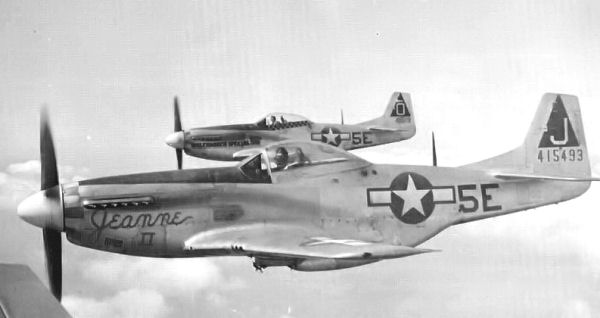
- Squadron P-51 Mustangs (Note: Aircraft are North American P-51D-15-NA Mustang 44-15493 Jeannie II, 5E-J and North American P-51K-5-NT Mustang, serial 44-11619 Boilermaker Special, 5E-O barBaugher, Joe (24 August 2023). "1942 USAF Serial Numbers". Joe Baugher.)
- Active: 1943–1945
- Country: United States
- Branch: United States Air Force
- Role: Fighter
- Engagements: European Theater of Operations
- Decorations: Distinguished Unit Citation

Insignia
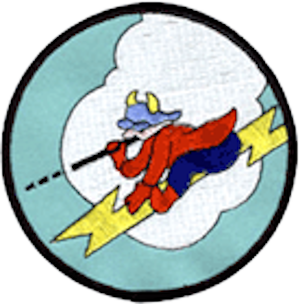
- 385th Fighter Squadron emblem (Note: Approved 30 August 1944. Description: Over and through a light turquoise blue disc, border black, a caricatured figure wearing light turquoise blue trousers and aviator's helmet with yellow horns, red coat, gloves, and boots, seated astride a large yellow lightning bolt striking to dexter base, and blowing bullets from muzzle of aerial machine gun barrel held in mouth like pea shooter, all in front of a large white cloud formation.)
- Fuselage code: 5E

The 385th Fighter Squadron is an inactive United States Air Force unit. The squadron was activated in February 1943. After training in the United States, it deployed to the European Theater of Operations. It flew combat missions until 1945, earning a Distinguished Unit Citation for its actions on 27 December 1944, defending a bomber formation during a raid on Frankfurt am Main. Following V-E Day, the squadron returned to the United States and was inactivated at Camp Kilmer, New Jersey, the port of embarkation.

== History ==
The 385th Fighter Squadron was activated on 1 June 1943 at Grand Central Airport (California), California as one of the three original squadrons of the 364th Fighter Group, The squadron trained with Lockheed P-38 Lightnings at various bases in California through 1943, and departed for the European Theater of Operations in January 1944.

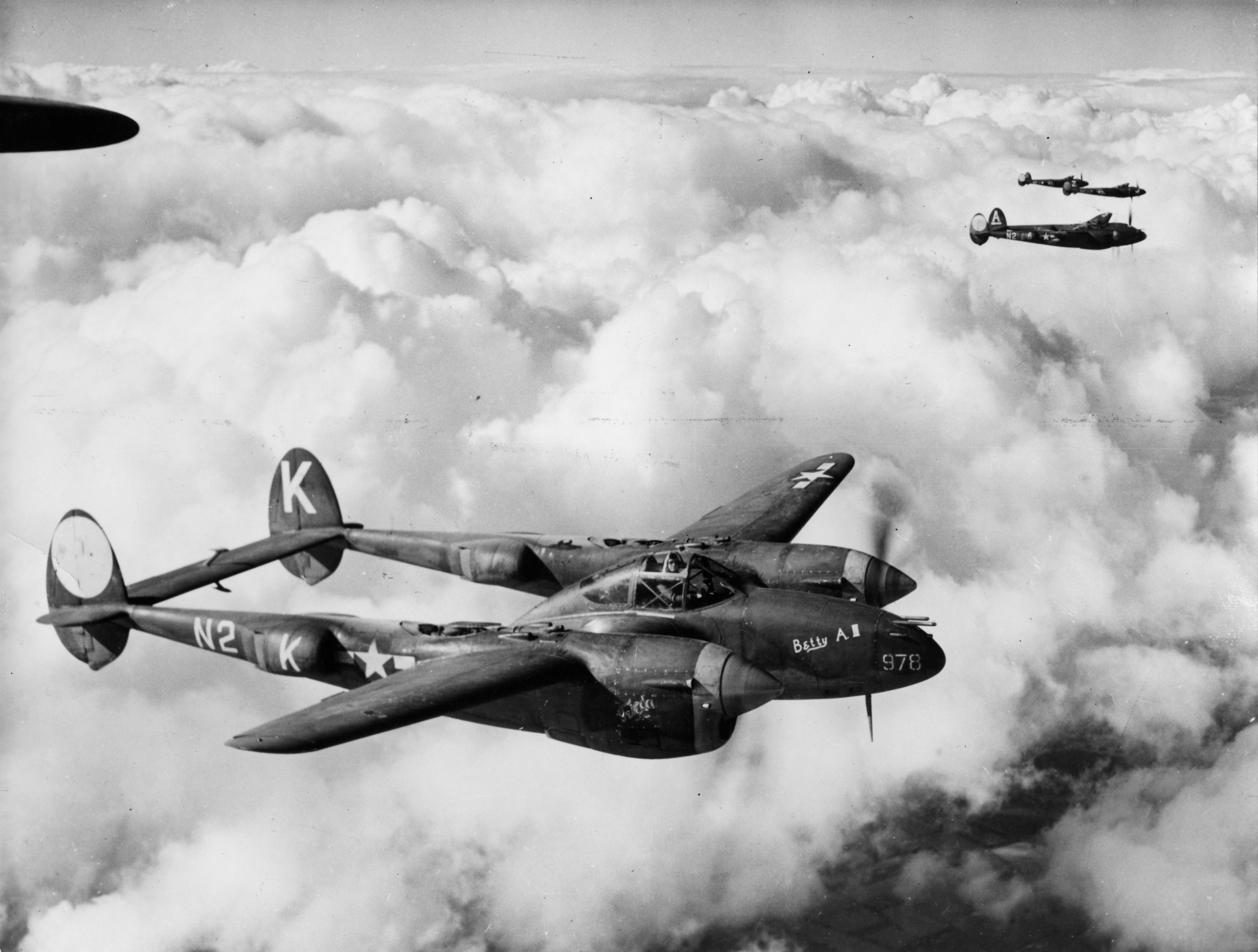
P-38 Lightnings of the 364th Fighter Group

It arrived at its combat station, RAF Honington, England in February 1944, where it became part of VIII Fighter Command. The squadron flew its first mission with its Lightnings on 3 March 1944. However, during that month, engine problems plagued the group's P-38s, with 16 of them failing to return from missions during the month, including the group commander, Colonel Frederick C. Grambo, while he was flying an orientation mission with the 20th Fighter Group. While the squadron flew dive bombing, strafing and patrol missions in France, Belgium, the Netherlands and Germany, it initially operated primarily as an escort for Boeing B-17 Flying Fortress and Consolidated B-24 Liberator heavy bombers.

It patrolled the English Channel during the D-Day landings in Normandy on 6 June 1944. While it continued flying bomber escort missions, it supported ground forces in France after the invasion by strafing and bombing locomotives, marshalling yards, bridges, barges and other targets. In July, it began to convert from its Lightnings to North American P-51 Mustangs, completing the switch in late July. The 364th Group had lost almost as many Lightnings as its claims of enemy aircraft destroyed, with the majority of the losses due to accidents and engine failure, not enemy action.

In the summer of 1944, and from then until the end of the war flew many long-range missions with its Mustangs, escorting heavy bombers that attacked oil refineries, industries and other strategic objectives in Berlin, Regensburg, Merseburg, Stuttgart, Brussels and elsewhere. During a raid on Frankfurt on 27 December 1944, the squadron dispersed a large group of Luftwaffe interceptors attacking the Martin B-26 Marauder formation the group was escorting. For this action, the unit was awarded the Distinguished Unit Citation.

In addition to its escort duties, the squadron also flew air sea rescue missions and carried out patrols. It continued to support ground forces as the battle line moved through France and into Germany. It participated in Operation Market Garden, the effort to secure a bridgehead across the Rhine, in September 1944, the Battle of the Bulge in December 1944 and January 1945, and Operation Lumberjack, the assault across the Rhine in Germany in March 1945. The squadron was credited with the destruction of 88.5 enemy aircraft during the war. (Note: The fractional credit is for a victory shared with a member of another unit.)

The squadron flew its last combat mission on 25 April 1945. Following V-E Day, the squadron remained at Honington, although many squadron members transferred to other units. In September, its remaining aircraft were transferred to depots. Its remaining personnel sailed for the United States on the RMS Queen Elizabeth, departing on 4 November. It arrived at the port of embarkation, Camp Kilmer, New Jersey on 9 November 1945 and was inactivated the following day.

=== Lineage ===
- Constituted 385th Fighter Squadron on 25 May 1943

Activated on 1 June 1943
Redesignated 385th Fighter Squadron c. 28 July 1944
Inactivated on 10 November 1945

=== Assignments ===
- 364th Fighter Group, 1 June 1943 – 10 November 1945

=== Stations ===
- Glendale Airport, California, 1 June 1943
- Van Nuys Airport, California, 12 August 1943
- Santa Maria Army Air Field, California, 6 October 1943 – 14 January 1944
- RAF Honington (Sta 375), England, 10 February 1944-4 November 1945
- Camp Kilmer, New Jersey, 9–10 November 1945

=== Aircraft ===
- Lockheed P-38 Lightning, 1943–1944
- North American P-51D Mustang, 1944–1945

=== Awards and campaigns ===
Award streamer	Award	Dates	Notes
	Distinguished Unit Citation	27 December 1944	Germany

Campaign Streamer	Campaign	Dates	Notes
	Air Offensive, Europe	10 February 1944–5 June 1944	
	Air Combat, EAME Theater	10 February 1944–11 May 1945	
	Normandy	6 June 1944–24 July 1944	
	Northern France	25 July 1944–14 September 1944	
	Rhineland	15 September 1944–21 March 1945	
	Ardennes-Alsace	16 December 1944–25 January 1945	
	Central Europe	22 March 1944–21 May 1945	
