= 495th Fighter Group =

495th Fighter Group

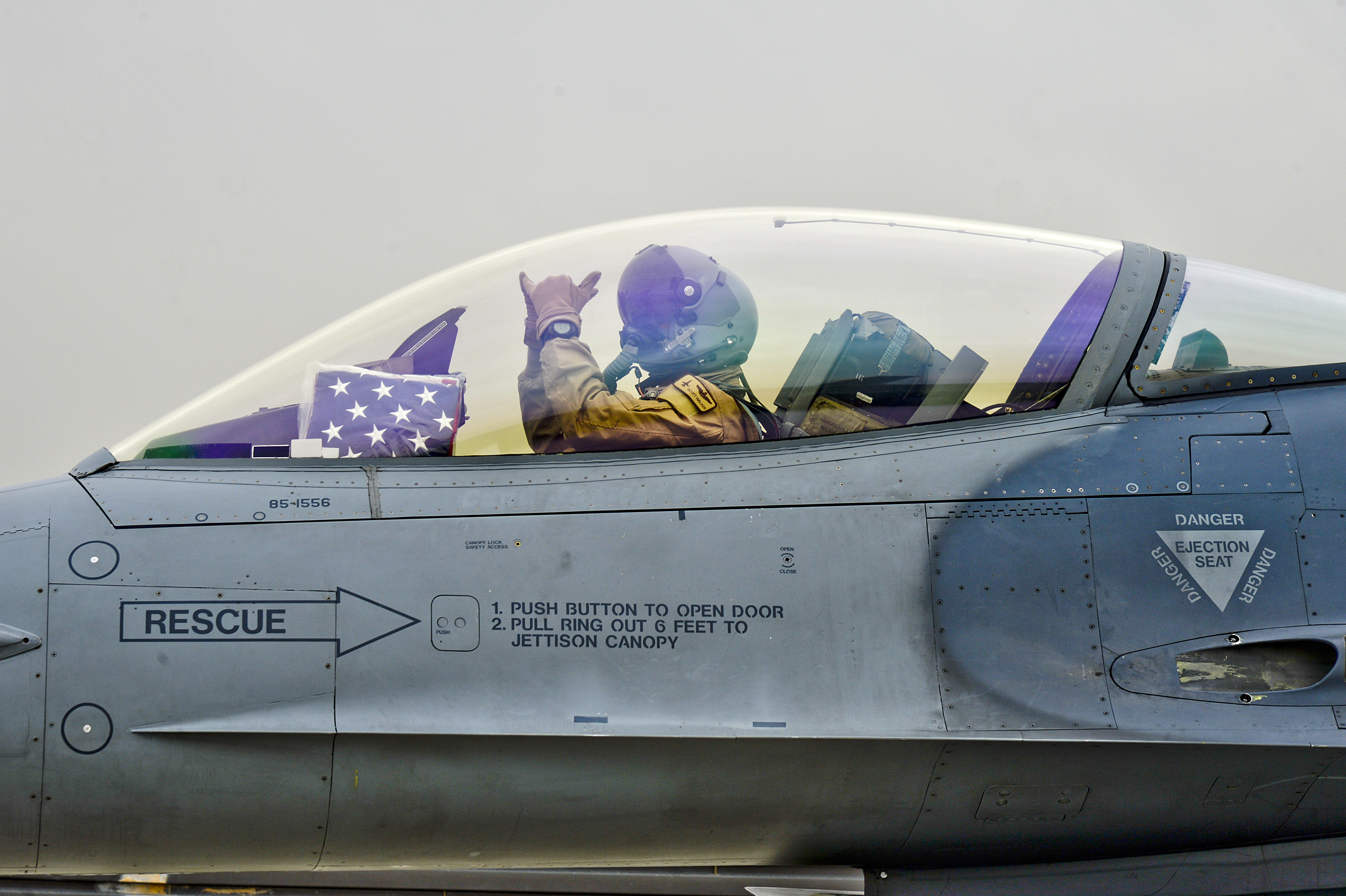
- An F-16 Fighting Falcon pilot of the 495th Fighter Group prepares to take off from Bagram Airfield
- Active: 1943–1945; 2013–present
- Country: United States
- Branch: United States Air Force
- Role: Fighter / Attack
- Part of: Air Combat Command: Fifteenth Air Force
- Garrison/HQ: Shaw Air Force Base, South Carolina
- Mottos: Ubi Concordia Ibi Victoria (Latin for 'Where there is Harmony, there is Victory')
- Engagements: European Theater of Operations

Commanders
- Colonel: David “Hulk” Bennett

Insignia
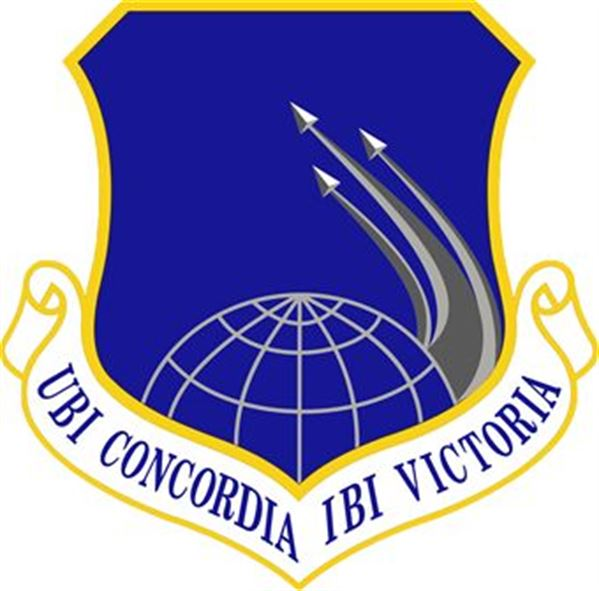
- 495th Fighter Group emblem

Aircraft flown
- Attack: A-10 Thunderbolt II
- Fighter: F-16 Fighting Falcon / F-15 Eagle / F-35 Lightning II

The 495th Fighter Group is an active duty fighter group in the United States Air Force. It is assigned to Fifteenth Air Force of Air Combat Command and stationed at Shaw Air Force Base, South Carolina, with additional units at multiple active Air Force, Air Force Reserve Command and Air National Guard installations across the United States.

The group was first activated in England during World War II as the 495th Fighter Training Group and trained fighter aircraft pilots for Eighth Air Force until it was disbanded in 1945. It was activated again in 2013 as the headquarters for Air Combat Command "active associate" fighter units.

== World War II ==
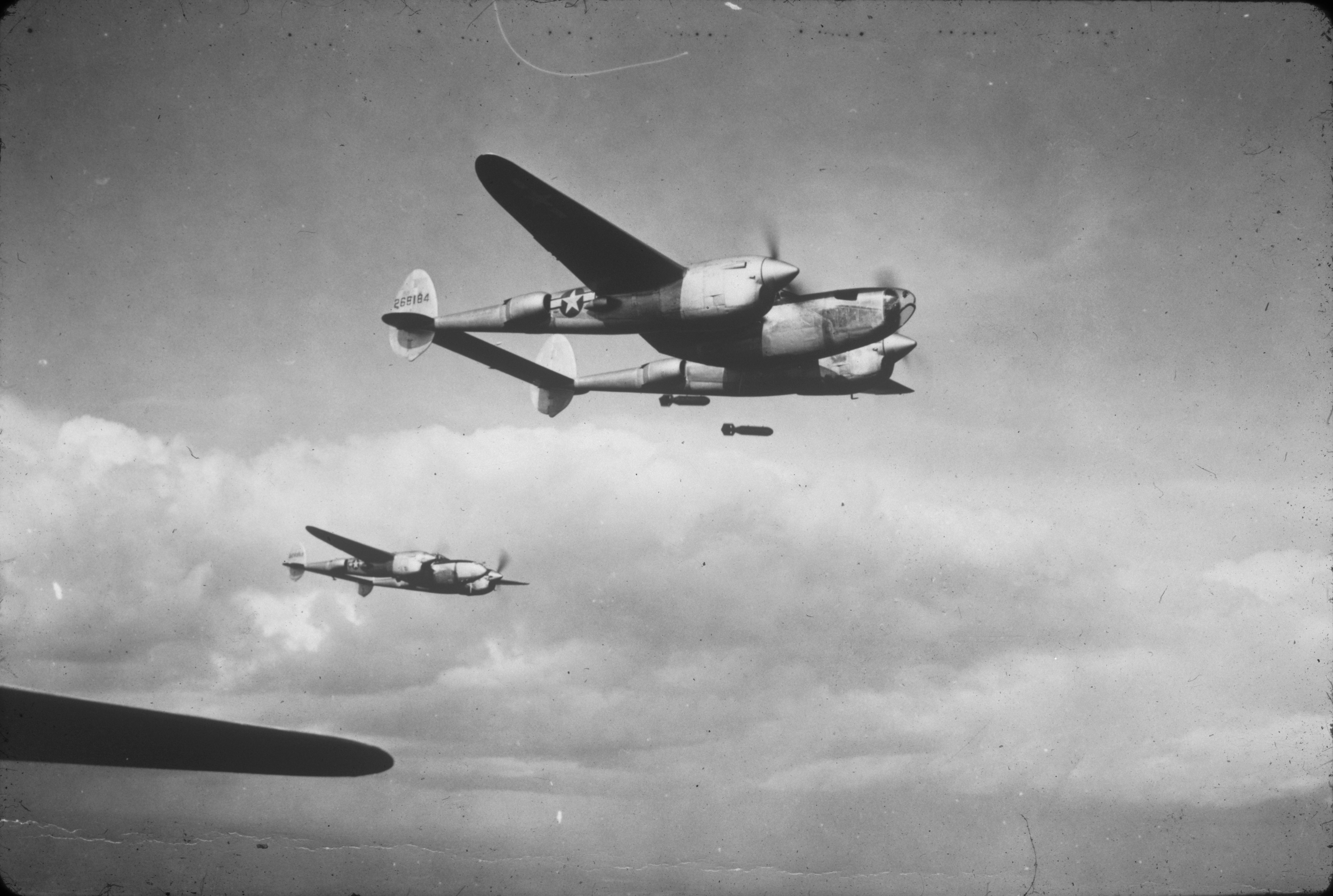
1943: Three P-38 Lightnings, AAF Ser. No. 42-68184 and two comrades, of the 495th Fighter Training Group in flight.

The 495th Fighter Training Group was established on 9 October 1943 and activated 26 October 1943 at RAF Atcham, England to provide forward training on tactics and operations for the European Theater during World War II. The group exercised command over the 551st and 552nd Fighter Training Squadrons flying the P-47 Thunderbolt and P-38 Lightning preparing pilots for action with Eighth and Ninth Air Forces. It moved to RAF Cheddington, in February 1945, and at the conclusion of hostilities was disbanded 15 April 1945.

== Active associate unit ==
"In 2008, Air Force leadership recognized that the changing force structure demanded creative ways to generate experienced fighter pilots. The solution was to capitalize on the experience and assets of the Guard and Reserve. This Total Force Integration initiative became Active Association, whereby Regular Air Force personnel work side-by-side with host Air Reserve and Air National Guard Component units in a mutually beneficial relationship."

"The 495th Fighter Group was reactivated 8 March 2013, at Shaw Air Force Base, SC, as an active association between active-duty pilots and their guard and reserve counterparts and marked a historical moment in the Air Force's ongoing initiative to integrate active-duty Airmen, Air Force Reserve Command (AFRC) and Air National Guard (ANG) units to streamline training, spending and resource use. [The group] is made up of more than 600 active-duty personnel across 22 ARC and ANG Fighter Wings under Air Combat Command."

"Total Force Integration is a vital enterprise aimed at maximizing the combined contributions of the Active and Reserve components, while ensuring "right-sizing" of component mix. The 495th Fighter Group will continue to lead active associate units into the future of Air Force pilot training and the partnerships will allow active-duty, Air National Guard and Air Reserve Component fighter units to share resources, reduce duplications of effort, and ultimately, increase the Air Force's overall air defense capabilities in order to enhance the ability to provide dominant combat airpower for America."

== Lineage ==
- Established as the 495th Fighter Training Group on 9 October 1943

Activated 26 October 1943
Disbanded on 15 April 1945

- Reconstituted and redesignated 495th Fighter Group

Activated on 8 March 2013

=== Assignments ===
- VIII Air Force Composite Command, 26 October 1943
- VIII Fighter Command, December 1943
- VIII Air Force Composite Command, February 1944
- VIII Fighter Command, September 1944
- 1st Bombardment Division (later 1st Air Division), November 1944 – 15 April 1945
- Ninth Air Force, 8 March 2013 – 20 August 2020
- Fifteenth Air Force, 20 August 2020 – present

=== Components ===
- 24th Fighter Squadron, 25 October 2019 – present

Naval Air Station Fort Worth Joint Reserve Base, Texas

- 53d Fighter Squadron, 10 December 2021 – present

Joint Base Andrews, Maryland

- 306th Fighter Squadron, 8 July 2022 - present

Atlantic City Air National Guard Base, New Jersey

- 315th Fighter Squadron, 9 January 2016 – present

Burlington Air National Guard Base, Vermont

- 316th Fighter Squadron, 2 October 2015 – present

McEntire Joint National Guard Base, South Carolina

- 355th Fighter Squadron, 5 October 2015 – 25 Oct 2019

Naval Air Station Fort Worth Joint Reserve Base, Texas

- 358th Fighter Squadron, 23 October 2015 – present

Whiteman Air Force Base, Missouri

- 367th Fighter Squadron, 23 October 2015 – present

Homestead Air Reserve Base, Florida

- 377th Fighter Squadron, c. 7 November 2015 – present

Montgomery Air National Guard Base, Alabama

- 378th Fighter Squadron, 8 November 2015 – present

Truax Field Air National Guard Base, Wisconsin

- 383d Fighter Squadron, 1 February 2016 - present

Buckley Space Force Base, Colorado

- 384th Fighter Squadron, 1 February 2016 - present

Duluth Air National Guard Base, Minnesota

- 551st Fighter Training Squadron, 26 October 1943 – 15 April 1945
- 552d Fighter Training Squadron, 26 October 1943 – 15 April 1945

=== Stations ===
- RAF Atcham, England, 25 December 1943
- RAF Cheddington, England, 15 February 1945 – 15 April 1945
- Shaw Air Force Base, South Carolina, 8 March 2013 – present

=== Aircraft flown ===
- F-16 Fighting Falcon, 2013 – present
- A-10 Thunderbolt II, 2013 – present
