= No. 3 (RAuxAF) Police Squadron =

No. 3 Royal Air Force (Reserves) Police Squadron
- Active: 1998 - present
- Country: United Kingdom
- Branch: Royal Air Force
- Role: Law enforcement
- Garrison/HQ: RAF Honington
- Motto: Let Justice be done

Commanders
- Honorary Air Commodore: Dame Sarah Thornton

No 3 (Royal Auxiliary Air Force) Police Squadron sits within the Air Security Force under No 1 Counter Intelligence & Security Wing. The Squadron generates RAF Police reservists to support the Air Security Force on both UK and Overseas operations across the globe, this is in addition to the delivery of RAF Police Reservist Phase 2 training. Squadron reservist personnel are trained and employed within Law Enforcement and across the full spectrum of RAF Police capabilities including Air Transport Security and Military Working Dogs, in addition to specialist functions including Counter Intelligence and Protective Security.

No 3 Police Squadron is based at RAF Honington in Suffolk.

== History ==
The Squadron was formed as a consequence of the assumptions made in the Strategic Defence Review, presented to Parliament by the Secretary of State for Defence (then George Robertson MP) in July 1998. The SDR recognised that deployed air operations are likely to take place at the end of a long supply chain or line of communication. Control of this line of communication is a task which falls to the service military police organisations: The Royal Air Force Police and the Royal Military Police. To undertake this expanded task, the establishment of the RAF Police was increased by a number of both regular personnel and reservists. After a study, it was decided that the most effective way for the reservists to be formed was as members of the Royal Auxiliary Air Force. These personnel would then be integrated with the existing Tactical Police and Security Squadron to form Tactical Police Wing. Recruiting for 3 (Royal Auxiliary Air Force) Police Squadron began in earnest in October 2002.

During 2005 elements of 3 TPS deployed on exercise with Territorial Army units of the Royal Military Police to Poland for Exercise Uhlan Eagle.

More latterly known as 3 (Royal Auxiliary Air Force) Police Squadron, No: 3 Royal Air Force (Tactical) Police Wing, the "Royal Auxiliary Air Force" element is often abbreviated to "RAuxAF".

Tactical Provost Wing is an independent Unit based at RAF Honington. The Wing had its roots in the Support Squadron of Headquarters Royal Air Force Provost and Security Services, which was formed in 1968 to provide a force reserve for the Provost Marshal, as they were then known, to deploy in support of operations, exercises and other contingencies.

It was re-titled Tactical Police and Security Squadron in 1996 as part of an increased focus on support to deployed operations.

The primary focus for the Squadron and latterly the Wing has been Lines of Communication Policing and policing of deployed operations and exercises in the United Kingdom and overseas. The Squadron and Wing also provides air transport fleet worldwide through searches of passengers and cargo, the guarding of aircraft and cargoes, and the assessment of airfield security. In addition it continues to provide Royal Air Force Police personnel to undertake military policing and security tasks on both deployed operating bases and in wider operational areas. There have been few Royal Air Force operations in the last 30 years which have not seen the deployment of RAF Police personnel including RAuxAF Police.

3 (Royal Auxiliary Air Force) Police Squadron is totally integrated into No: 3 Royal Air Force (Tactical) Police Wing structure. Much of its support comes from Wing level resources and, in turn, personnel can expect to work directly alongside their regular counterparts. Applicants to join are invited to attend the Squadron Headquarters at RAF Henlow for a half day selection board. The board includes an aptitude test, interview and medical examination.

Selected recruits complete a Basic Recruit Course held at RAF Halton. The BRC is in two phases:

- Phase 1 - 4 weekends at RAF Honington
- Phase 2 - Trade Training is then done at weekends and a residential 16-day period.

Continuation then takes place at RAF Honington for one weekend every month (usually the second weekend, except November because of Remembrance weekend). Previous service and/or the person's civilian career can expedite this process at various stages.
