= Lashenden Air Warfare Museum =

Aviation museum in England

Coordinates: 51.1536°N 0.6466°E

Lashenden Air Warfare Museum is an aviation museum at Lashenden (Headcorn) Airfield in Kent in southeast England.

== Exhibits ==
A Pickett-Hamilton Fort at Lashenden Air Warfare Museum. This restored example came from Kent International Airport (RAF Manston). Originally the fort would have been placed so that, when lowered, it would be flush with the ground; this example has been installed at ground level so that it is possible to see the internal mechanism through a small window. The animation runs 16 times faster than real-time.

A Fieseler Fi 103R Reichenberg, a piloted version of the V-1 flying bomb.

The Focke-Achgelis Fa 330A-1 gyro-kite, used by U-boats for reconnaissance.

A Pickett-Hamilton Fort, a pop-up pillbox from World War II, was recently excavated from RAF Manston and restored.

The museum has a large collection of aircraft components and memorabilia.
