= Pickett-Hamilton fort =

Type of retractable concrete pillbox used in Britain during World War II

- Lashenden Air Warfare Museum
- Pickett-Hamilton fort excavated and reconstructed above ground for public display

Site information
- Type: Pillbox

Site history
- In use: Second World War
- Materials: Concrete

A Pickett-Hamilton fort is a type of hardened field fortification built in Britain during the invasion crisis of 1940–1941. It was designed to be lowered into the ground when not in use, to become inconspicuous and not interfere with the passage of taxiing aircraft or other vehicles. The fort could be raised to about 2 feet 6 inches (0.76 m) above ground level where it would be a physical impediment to aircraft and vehicles and from where a small crew could fire with rifles or light machine guns.

== Development ==
By reason of its forming no obstacle to use of ground for flying or traffic, the post can be sited in places where not even a rifleman or small post can be put, and can bring fire on to ground which otherwise could not be covered at all or only at extreme ranges.

— Pickett-Hamilton Fort Advisory Committee (1940)

The open spaces of airfields were very vulnerable to attack by airborne troops and it was felt that it was particularly important to defend them effectively. However, conventional defences such as pillboxes and trenches could not be installed without danger to friendly aircraft. At this time a number of private companies contacted the government with their own design ideas. (Note: See Bison concrete armoured lorry for an alternative portable airfield defence scheme, put forward by Concrete Limited.)

The Pickett-Hamilton fort was designed by Francis Norman Pickett and Donald St Aubyn Hamilton. Pickett (1887–1957) was an engineer. He graduated from London University in 1907, and from 1918 to 1931 he was Proprietor of the firm of F. N. Pickett et Fils, engaged in the disposal of ammunition. Despite considerable difficulties, the business proved profitable for Pickett before the company eventually failed. Pickett spent much of the early 1920s involved in motor racing. He subsequently became managing director of Kaycee, Ltd., in 1931–35, of Consolidated Rubber Manufacturers, Ltd., in 1935–38, and of Ocean Salts (Products), Ltd., in 1938. Hamilton (1907–1956) was an architect based in London. Later, as part of Donald Hamilton, Wakeford & Partners, he designed many buildings in London and southern England.

A friend of Norman Pickett, racing driver Donald Campbell, allowed his workshops to be used to build the prototypes. In early 1940, Campbell attended the operational trials of the prototype at RAF Andover.

Winston Churchill wrote to General Ismay on 12 July 1940 saying: "I saw these pillboxes for the first time when I visited Langley last week. This appears to afford an admirable means of anti-parachute defence and it should surely be widely adopted. Let me have a plan." This pillbox was adopted by the Air Ministry and became known as the Pickett-Hamilton fort.

== Design ==
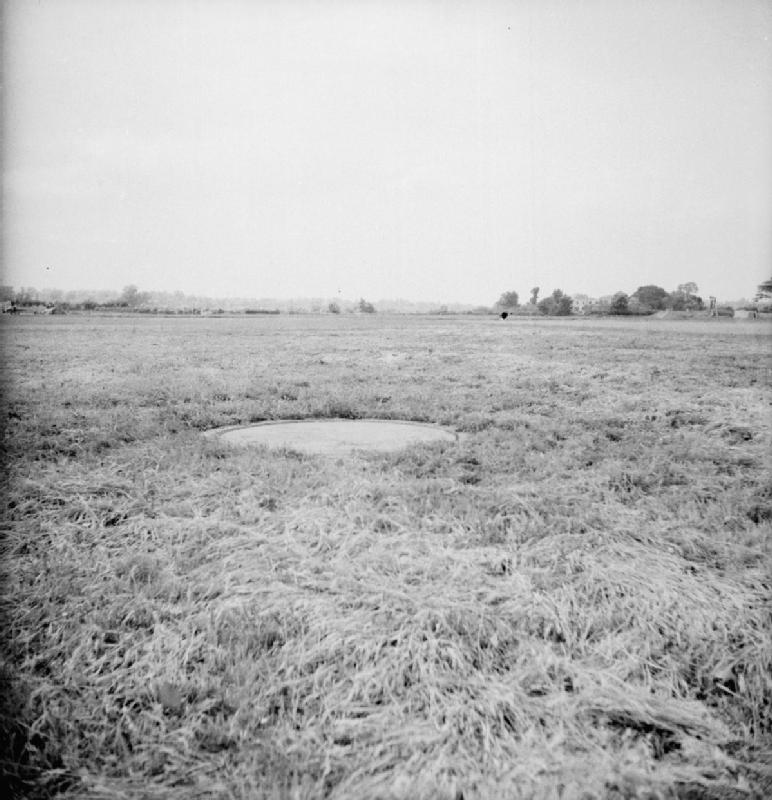
Retracted to ground level.

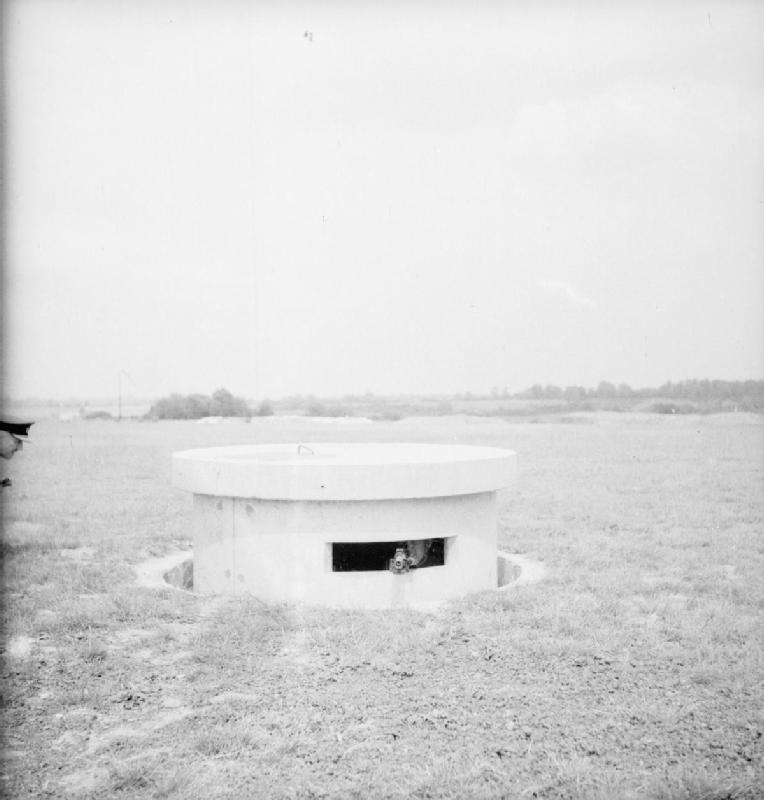
Fully raised and manned by a Bren-gun team of the Coldstream Guards

Pickett-Hamilton Retractable Fort on a fighter airfield in Southern England

The most common version of the Pickett-Hamilton fort consists of two cylinders of pre-cast concrete each with one end closed. The slightly smaller of the two cylinders slides into the larger and they are kept apart by small guard rollers on the moving part that engaged with grooves. The structure is buried so that the overhanging top of the smaller cylinder lies flush with the ground. Closed in this position the pillbox is inconspicuous and allows aircraft and other vehicles to safely drive straight over it.

The interior is accessed via a small hatch and rungs built into the structure. To bring it into action a lifting mechanism was used to raise the inner cylinder by about 2 feet 6 inches (0.76 m) thereby revealing three embrasures. A crew of two men could then operate the fort as a pillbox.

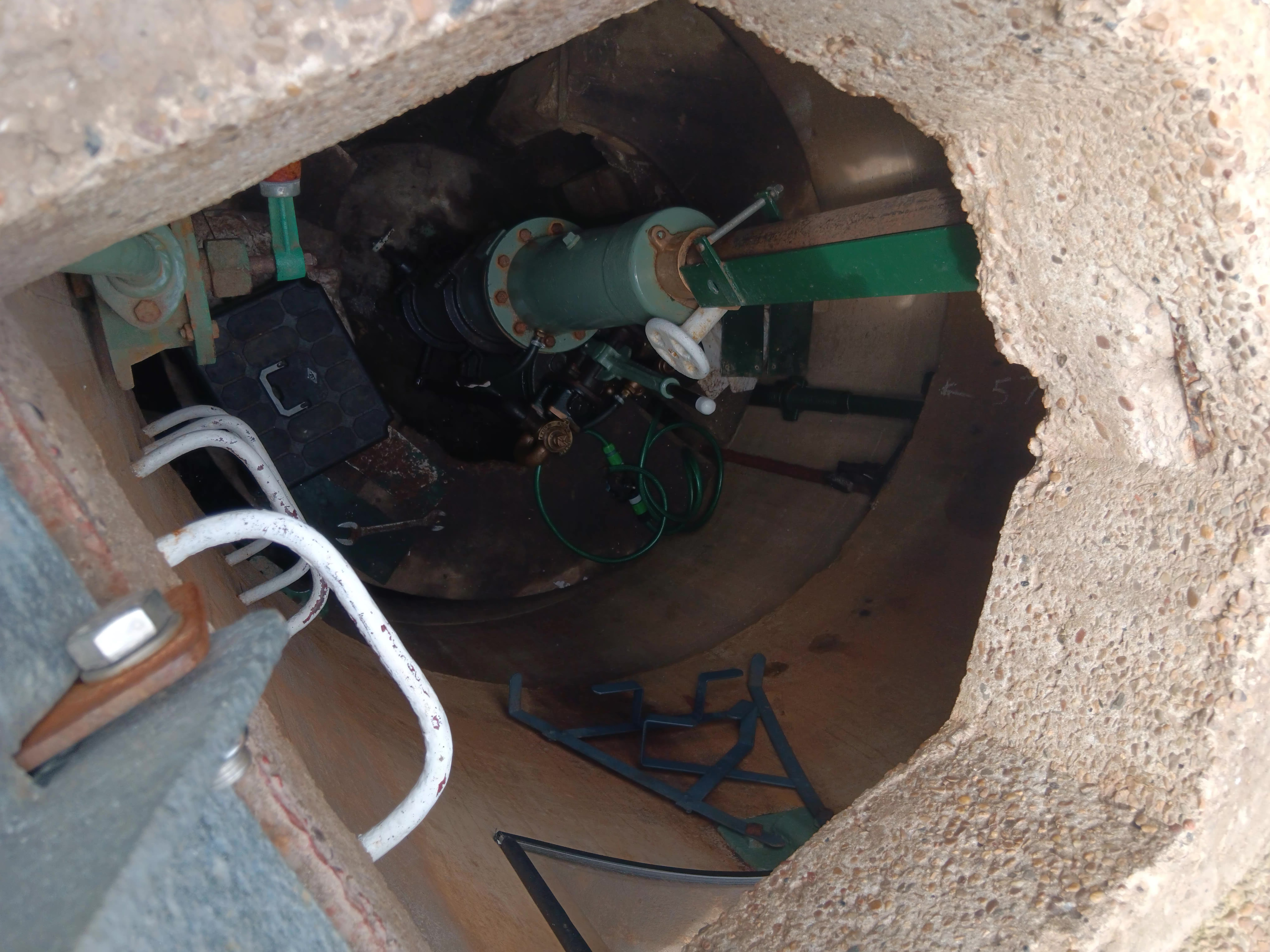
Internal View of Pickett-Hamilton Fort, Silloth, Cumbria

Initially, the lifting mechanism consisted of a standard 8-ton aeroplane jack that took three minutes to raise the fort. This was soon replaced with a pneumatic ram that was based on a system originally intended for agricultural use. The pneumatic system operated with compressed air stored in cylinders: this allowed the fort to be raised and lowered quickly when speed was essential. A hand pump was also provided to raise the fort for daily maintenance or as a backup method.

An alternative design used counterbalance weights to raise the fort. This allowed the fort to be raised by the physical strength of the garrison. This design had two access hatches and, with a slightly larger underground chamber and the elimination of the central pneumatic ram the fort could have a crew of four men. Under consideration in late 1940, this alternative design was not used in significant numbers and only about a dozen were installed.

The cost of construction was about £240 (equivalent to £11,600 in 2025).

== Extant examples ==
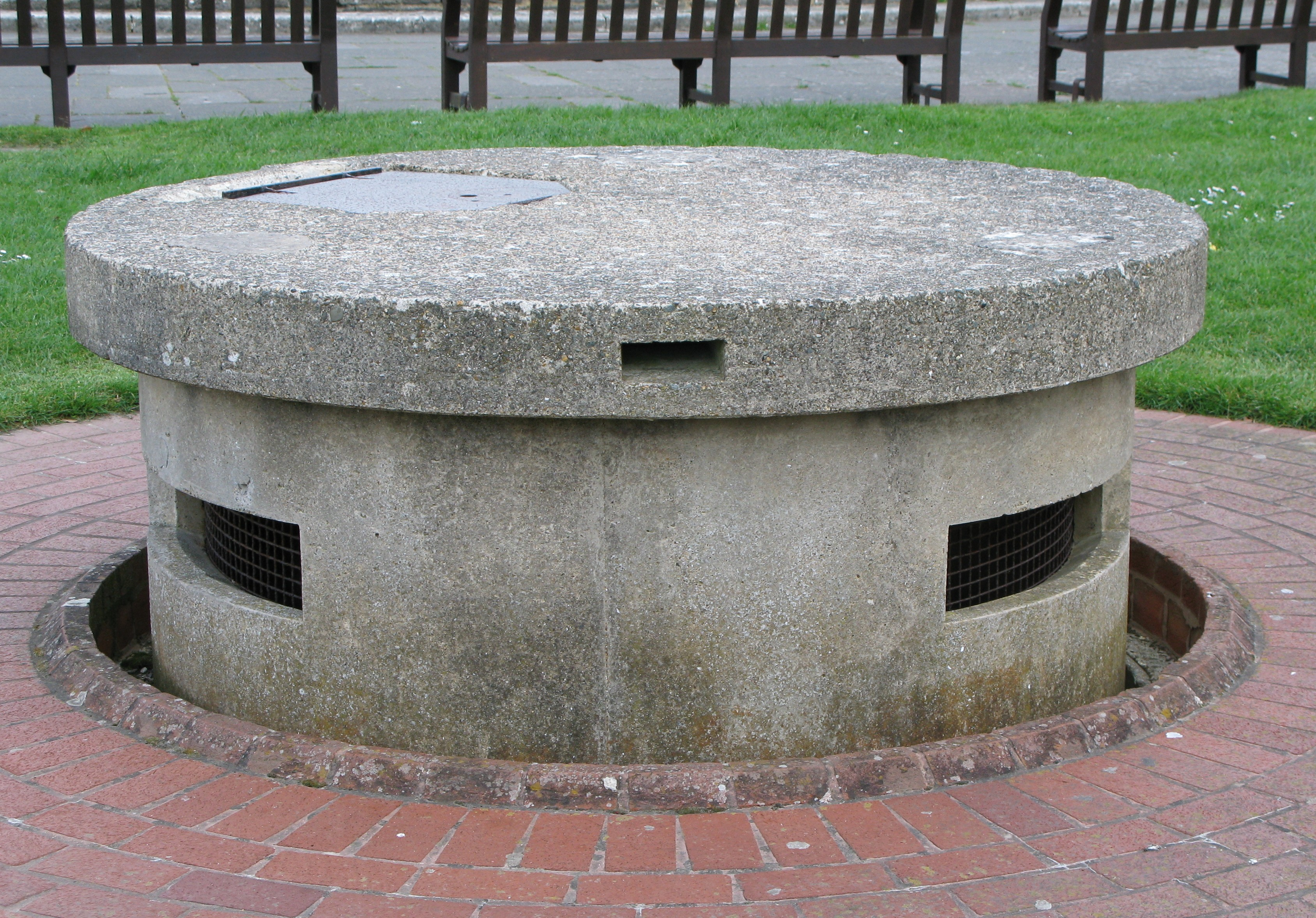
A Pickett Hamilton fort in Southsea

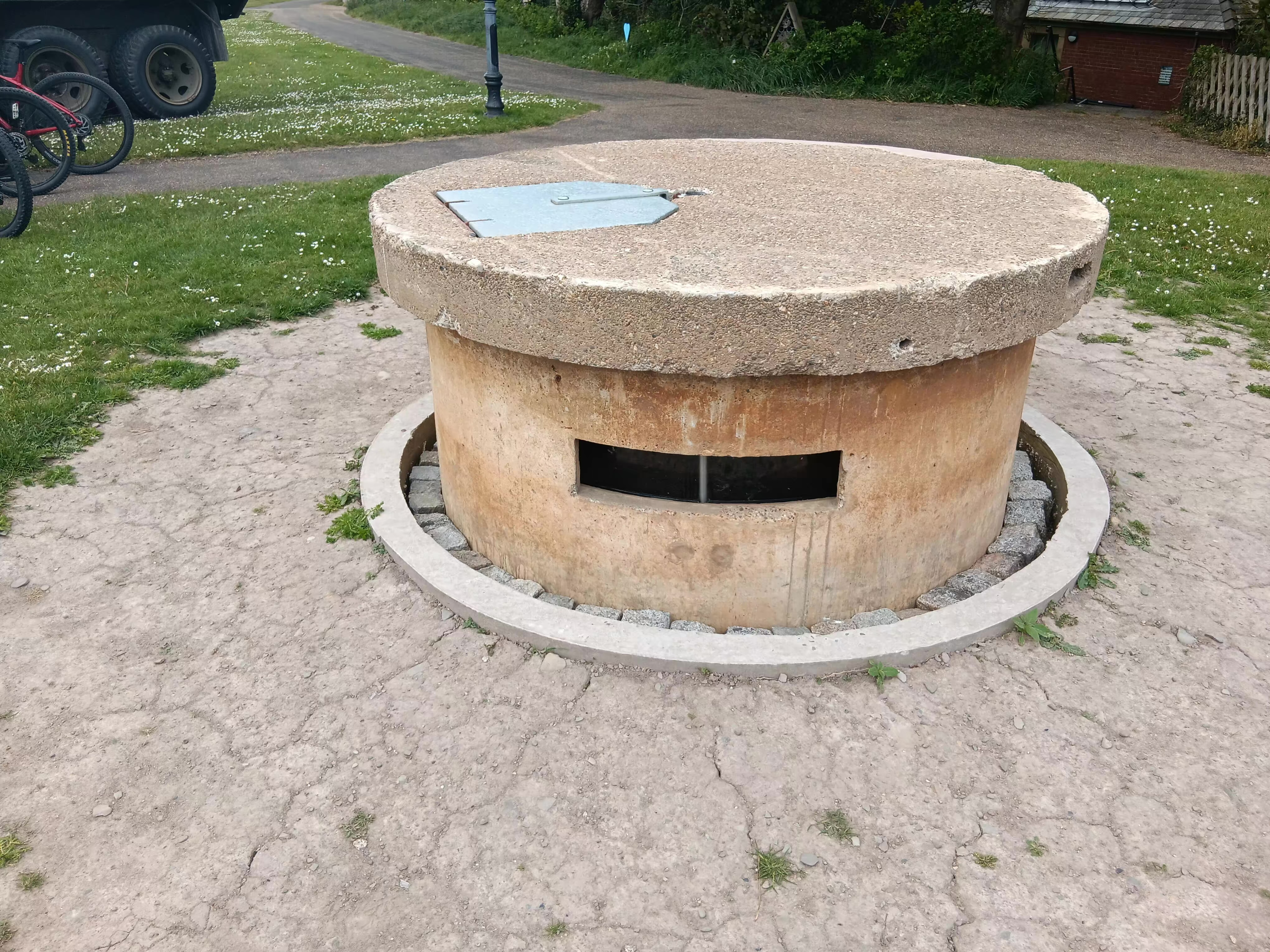
Pickett-Hamilton fort, Silloth, Cumbria

The forts were prone to flooding and they were not strong enough to bear the weight of the heavier aircraft developed during the war. Consequently, many forts were moved to the periphery of airfields and are not in their original location. More recently, some forts have been moved as airfields have been developed for modern aircraft. Records show that there were 335 installations. Forty-eight examples of this type remain extant.

A number of forts are displayed at Museums: Tangmere Military Aviation Museum, Lashenden Air Warfare Museum, D-Day Museum, Southsea (moved from its original location) and an inner part only at the Imperial War Museum Duxford.

Because they retract into the ground inconspicuously, many examples have been lost and rediscovered many years later.

The management of Kent International Airport (formerly RAF Manston) donated a Pickett-Hamilton fort to Lashenden Air Warfare Museum. Most of the surviving forts are flooded but the fort at Manston was dry and in superb condition. The fort was excavated and restored to working order by museum members over a period of 18 months. Although the fort was originally intended to be buried on an airfield there was concern that putting it in the ground might, over time, degrade the concrete. Therefore, the fort has been placed at ground level and surrounded with a cone of earth and sandbags. The lifting mechanism is in working order and can be activated by visitors putting a coin into a slot. This is the only fully restored Pickett-Hamilton fort.

There is a reconditioned fort now displayed in the Linear Park at Kings Hill in Kent situated on the original West Malling Airfield.

A fort was dug up from the former RAF Burtonwood airfield after the M62 motorway was built over the length of the main runway in 1973. It now stands in residential parkland named 'Airlift Hill' to the south of the original site.

A Pickett-Hamilton fort originally located at RAF Silloth has been restored and moved, becoming part of the Silloth Military Trail display on The Green, Silloth, Cumbria.

== See also ==
- British anti-invasion preparations of the Second World War
- British hardened field defences of World War II
