= Rouffignac =

- Commune
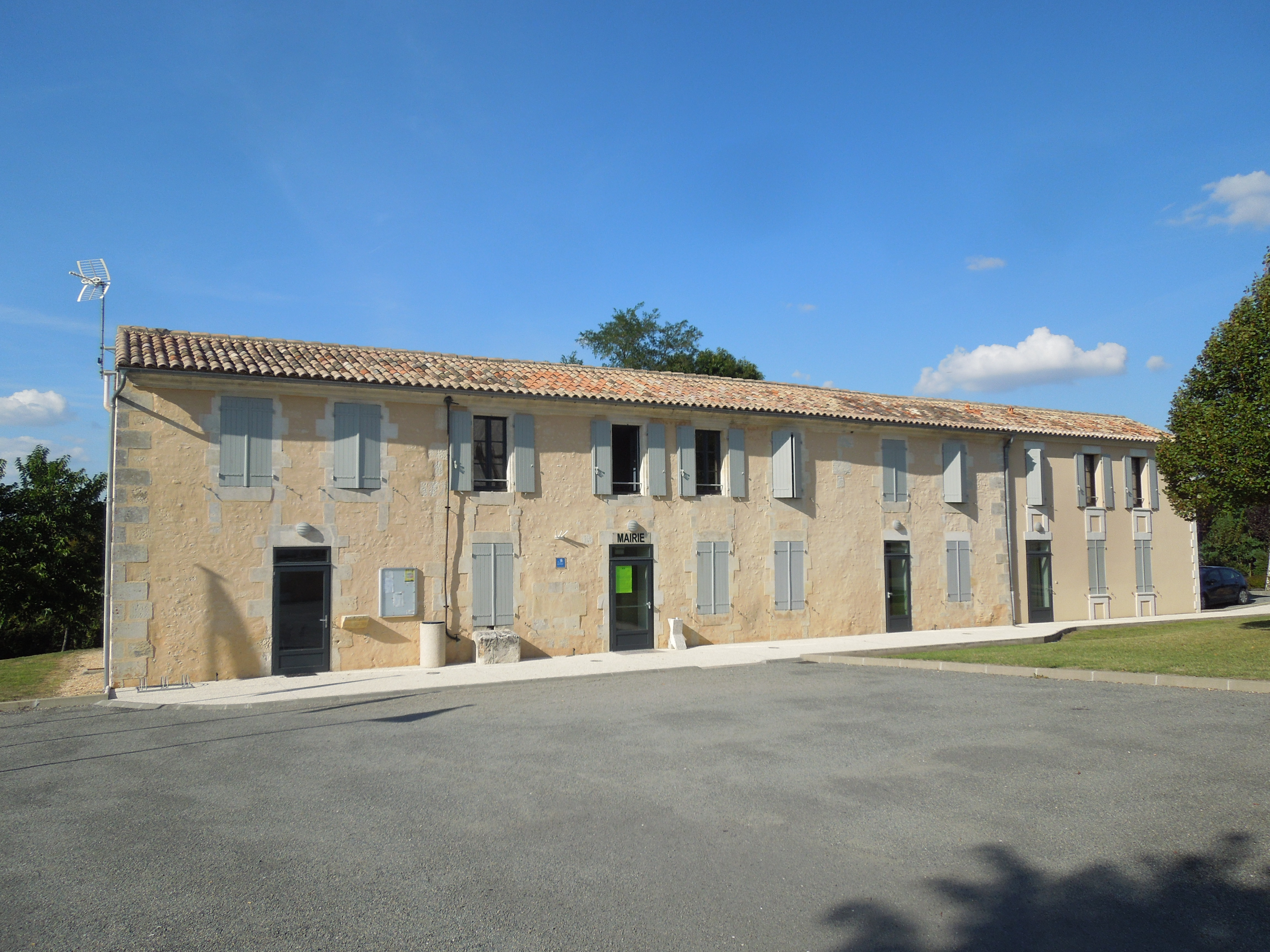
- The town hall in Rouffignac
- Location of Rouffignac
- Location within France Location within Nouvelle-Aquitaine
- Coordinates: 45°20′09″N 0°26′56″W
- Country: France
- Region: Nouvelle-Aquitaine
- Department: Charente-Maritime
- Arrondissement: Jonzac
- Canton: Les Trois Monts
- Intercommunality: Haute-Saintonge

Government
  - Mayor (2020–2026): Dominique Amiaud
- Area^{1}: 14.62 km^{2} (5.64 sq mi)
- Elevation: 70 m (230 ft)
- Highest elevation: 111 m (364 ft)
- Lowest elevation: 34 m (112 ft)
- Population (2023): 437
  - Density: 29.9/km^{2} (77.4/sq mi)
- Time zone: UTC+01:00 (CET)
  - Summer (DST): UTC+02:00 (CEST)
- INSEE/Postal code: 17305 /17130
- ^{1} French Land Register data, which excludes lakes, ponds, glaciers > 1 km^{2} (0.386 sq mi or 247 acres) and river estuaries.

Rouffignac (French pronunciation: [ʁufiɲak]) is a commune in the Charente-Maritime department in southwestern France.

== Population ==
Historical population
Year	Pop.	±% p.a.
1968	475	—
1975	418	−1.81%
1982	374	−1.58%
1990	358	−0.55%
1999	361	+0.09%
2007	436	+2.39%
2012	433	−0.14%
2017	422	−0.51%
2023	437	+0.58%
Source: INSEE

== See also ==
- Communes of the Charente-Maritime department
