= Camp Kilmer =

U.S. military facility in New Jersey

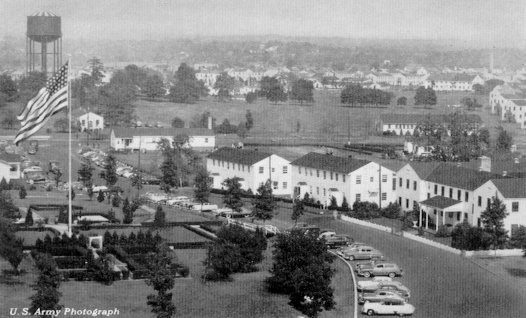
U.S. Army Photograph of Camp Kilmer

Camp Kilmer is a former United States Army camp in Central New Jersey that was activated in June 1942 as a staging area and part of an installation of the New York Port of Embarkation. The camp was organized as part of the Army Service Forces Transportation Corps. Troops were quartered at Camp Kilmer in preparation for transport to the European Theater of Operations in World War II. Eventually, it became the largest processing center for troops heading overseas and returning from World War II, processing over 2.5 million soldiers. It officially closed in 2009.

== Operation ==
=== World War II ===
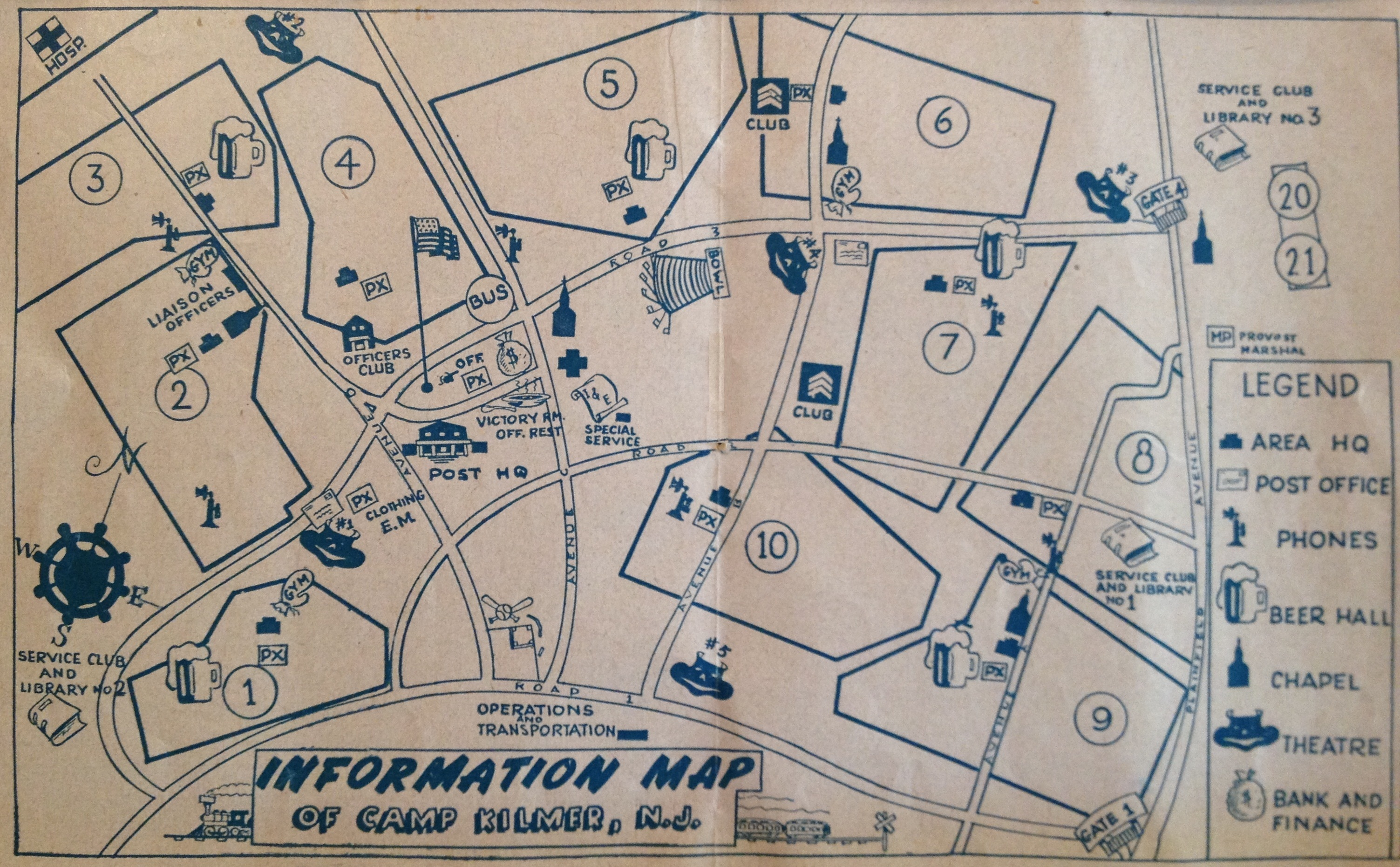
1945 map of Camp Kilmer

The camp was named for Joyce Kilmer, a poet killed in World War I while serving with 69th Infantry Regiment. His home was in nearby New Brunswick, New Jersey.

The site was selected in 1941 by the War Department as the best site to serve the New York Port of Embarkation. Construction began in early 1942. Located in Piscataway Township, New Jersey and Edison Township, New Jersey at 40°31′00″N 74°26′45″W, the closest city was New Brunswick located two miles to the south. Plainfield was located four miles north of the camp. New York City, about 22 miles to the northeast, could be reached by the mainline of the Pennsylvania Railroad. A flyover loop crossing the four-track mainline (now the Amtrak NEC) allowed movements into the large train loading yards without interference with mainline traffic. Many troop embarkations would be at the New Jersey locations of Military Ocean Terminal at Bayonne and Hoboken. The camp was also served by the Port Reading branch of the Reading Railroad and the Amboy branch of the Lehigh Valley Railroad.

The post was activated in June 1942 and the first unit to arrive at Camp Kilmer was the 332nd Engineer General Service Regiment, a complement of 1,239 enlisted men and 52 officers. The unit arrived July 22, 1942, on three separate trains from Camp Claiborne, Louisiana. The buildings were constructed of wood and were painted bright contrasting colors for a camouflage effect. This was similar to the dazzle camouflage used for ships in World War I. The camp primarily consisted of ten "Disposition Areas", or sets of barracks in which units and soldiers were assigned while awaiting transportation to Europe.

At Camp Kilmer troops sent personal effects home, received medical injections and the supplies needed before loading onto transport ships for travel to the European Theater of Operations. After V-E Day, the post was used to process troops returning from Europe, prior to sending them on to their local Personnel Center, Separation Center or Reception Station. The camp remained active until the fall of 1949 when it was no longer needed.

=== Post-war ===
In the fall of 1950, with hostilities in Korea, the camp was reactivated. It was placed on inactive status again in June 1955, but continued to serve as discharge site for troops returning from Europe. In November 1956 it served as an initial place for housing for refugees from the 1956 Hungarian Revolution until June 1957. In March 1958, Camp Kilmer became Headquarters for the U.S. Army II Corps, the controlling headquarters for United States Army Reserve units across the northeast.

Camp Kilmer also housed a maintenance and repair facility supporting the Nike/Hercules missile sites in the greater New York metropolitan area. This facility included large, armored rooms with heavy blast doors where missile engines and conventional warheads were stored and maintained.

During the Cold War after the failed 1956 Hungarian Revolution 30,000 refugees were resettled at Camp Kilmer. Many settled in New Brunswick, which had a thriving Hungarian American community in its Fifth Ward. The concentration camp scenes for the 1964 movie The Pawnbroker were filmed in the section of Camp Kilmer which had been used for the movement of prisoners-of-war.

== Later history ==
In 1963, most of the 1,600 acres was auctioned and sold to local governments and Rutgers University. By the 1960s much of the Camp's properties and land were dispersed. Today, there is a Vocational Training Center located at the site as well as housing and schools. Areas surrounding the former base now belong to Piscataway Township or to Rutgers University and many existent buildings and facilities were clearly part of the former Camp Kilmer. A few extant structures are now occupied by the Timothy Christian School.

The Livingston College campus currently sits on 540-acres acquired by Rutgers in 1964. The camp's post command headquarters building still exists, located at 35 Berrue Circle on Rutgers Livingston Campus in Piscataway, and used by the Rutgers Makerspace. As an "upgraded" military building, the building's lobby includes the original curved staircases and the cashier's pay windows.

Portions of the World War II-era camp are still used by the Edison Job Corps, including some of the original barracks, the chapel and post flag pole. The Edison Job Corps Center (Excess Land Sale Only) is on a High Value Asset List of fourteen properties that the United States Public Buildings Reform Board recommended for disposal in 2019.

=== Sergeant Joyce Kilmer Reserve Center ===
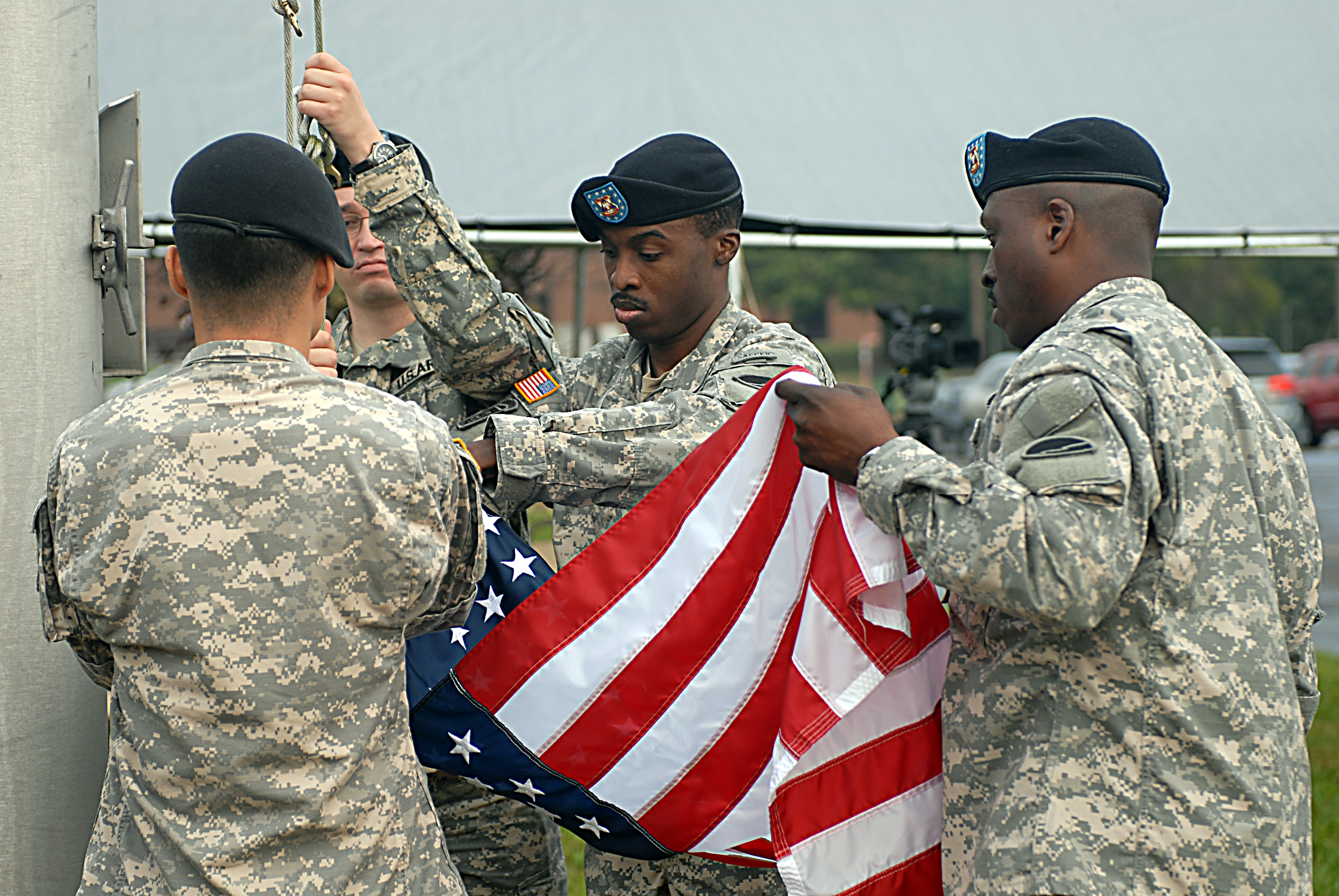
A color guard from the 78th Division (Training) takes down the colors for the last time during the Kilmer U.S. Army Reserve Center's inactivation ceremony.

Throughout the 1980s and 90s, the remnants of Camp Kilmer, then known as the Sergeant Joyce Kilmer Reserve Center, was the location for Headquarters, 78th Division (TS) and for the Division's 1st Brigade (BCST) headquarters, both units of the US Army Reserve. The 78th Division (TS), nicknamed the "Lightning Division" or "Jersey Lightning", is the lineal descendant of the 78th Division of World War I and the 78th Infantry Division of World War II. The current 78th Division (TS) is responsible for conducting simulations exercises and field training for US Army Reserve and Army National Guard units across 14 states from North Carolina to the Canada–US border.

In the immediate aftermath of the September 11th terrorist attacks, the Federal Emergency Management Agency created a temporary headquarters at the facility.

As of October 2009, the Sergeant Joyce Kilmer Reserve Center was closed as per the recommendation of the Base Realignment and Closure, 2005. The last tenant units relocated to Fort Dix. In Fall 2014 the last section of Camp Kilmer was occupied by the Edison Township Public Works Department.

== Notable people ==
- New York Yankee star Joe DiMaggio and comedian Red Skelton, both serving with the Army, were temporarily assigned to the Camp. DiMaggio autographed baseballs for wounded soldiers and gave hitting and fielding lessons, while Skelton made unannounced visits to the hospital for his version of "laugh therapy." Numerous celebrities visited the camp to put on shows for the troops including Betty Grable, Benny Goodman and others.

== Environmental hazard ==
The former environs of Camp Kilmer, and the current Kilmer Reserve Center, are soiled with numerous contaminants including PAHs, VOCs, SVOCs, PCBs, asbestos, and heavy metals affecting groundwater, surface waters and sediment, as well as the soil.

== Bibliography ==
- "Camp Kilmer" pamphlet. Camp Kilmer, NJ: Special Services Branch, 1945.
