= 379th Fighter Squadron =

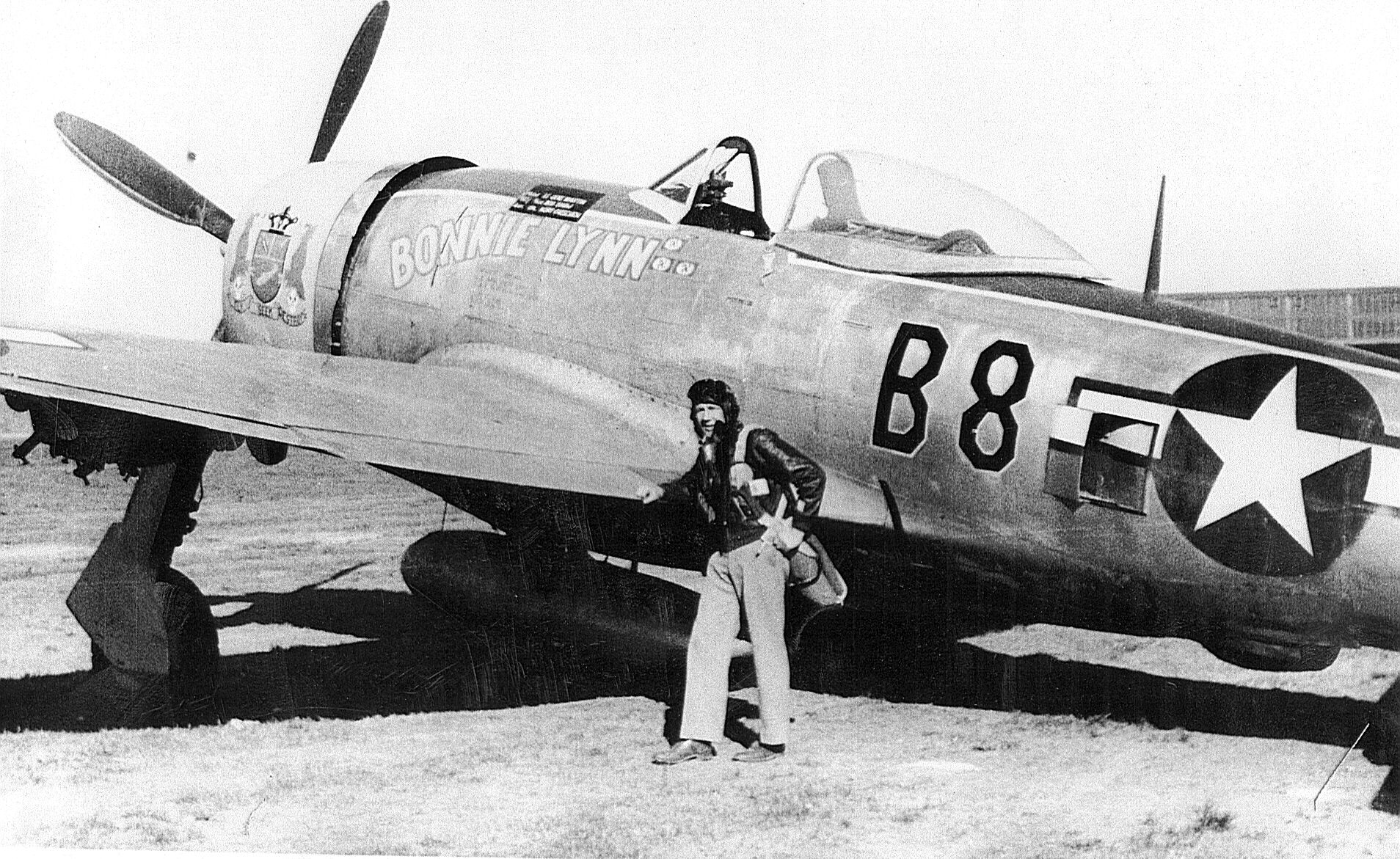
- 379th Fighter Squadron P-47D Thunderbolt "Bonnie Lynn", 1945
- Active: 10 February 1943 – 1 August 1946
- Country: United States
- Branch: United States Army Air Forces
- Type: Fighter
- Fuselage Code: "B8"

Insignia
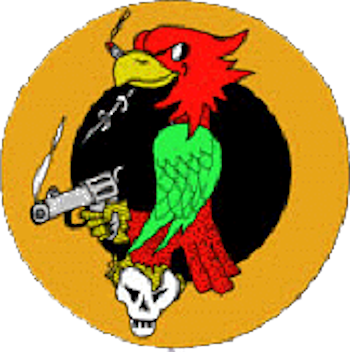
- 379th Fighter Squadron

Aircraft flown
- Fighter: P-47D Thunderbolt; P-51H Mustang

The 379th Fighter Squadron is an inactive United States Air Force unit. Its last was assigned to the 362d Fighter Group, Second Air Force, stationed at Biggs Field, Texas. It was inactivated on 1 August 1946.

== History ==
Established on 1 March 1943 at Westover Field, Massachusetts as the 362d Fighter Group, equipped with P-47 Thunderbolts. Deployed to the European Theater of Operations (ETO), and assigned to Ninth Air Force in England. Engaged in combat operations until May 1945.

Reassigned back to the United States in August–September 1945, and assigned to First Air Force at Seymour Johnson Field, North Carolina, being programmed for deployment to Okinawa to take part in the planned Invasion of Japan. As a result of the Atomic bombings of Hiroshima and Nagasaki and the sudden end of the Pacific War, the deployment plans were canceled, however the unit was retained as part of the Second Air Force under Continental Air Forces and reassigned to Biggs Field, Texas, being equipped with P-51 Mustangs. Inactivated on 1 August due to postwar budget restrictions.

=== Lineage ===
- Constituted 379th Fighter Squadron on 11 February 1943

Activated on 1 March 1943
Inactivated on 1 August 1946

=== Assignments ===
- 362d Fighter Group, 1 March 1943 – 1 August 1946

=== Stations ===
- Westover Field, Massachusetts, 1 March 1943
- Bradley Field, Connecticut, 22 June 1943
- Groton Field, Connecticut, 2 August 1943
- Mitchel Field, New York, 19 October – 12 November 1943
- RAF Wormingford (AAF-159), England, 30 November 1943
- RAF Headcorn (AAF-412), England, 13 April 1944
- Lignerolles Airfield (A-12), France, 2 July 1944
- Rennes/St-Jacques Airfield (A-27), France, 10 August 1944
- Prosnes Airfield (A-79), France, 19 September 1944
- Verdun Airfield (A-82), France, 5 November 1944
- Frankfurt/Rhine-Main Airfield (Y-73), Germany, 8 April 1945
- Furth/Industriehafen Airfield (R-30), Germany, 30 April 1945
- Illesheim Airfield (R-10), Germany, 3 May 1945
- AAF Station Straubing, Germany, 12 May–August 1945
- Seymour Johnson Field, North Carolina, 5 September 1945
- Biggs Field, Texas, 3 December 1945 – 1 August 1946.
- Joe Foss Field, aka Sioux Falls Regional Airport, South Dakota, 2015 – present

=== Aircraft ===
- P-47D Thunderbolt, 1943–1945
- P-51H Mustang, 1945–1946
