= 377th Fighter Squadron =

377th Fighter Squadron

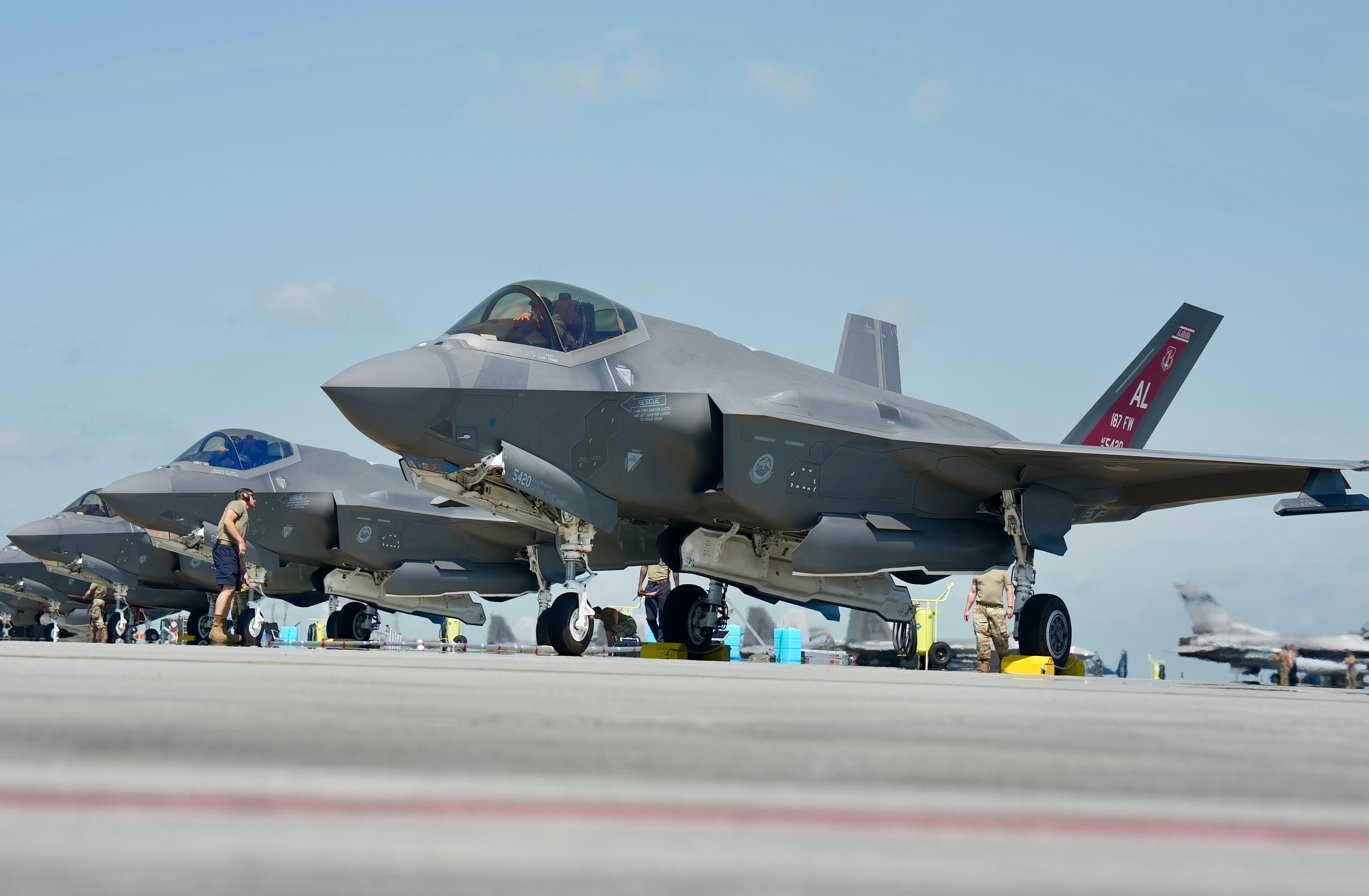
- F-35 Lightnings of the 100th Fighter Squadron
- Active: 1943–1946; 2014–present
- Country: United States
- Branch: United States Air Force
- Role: Fighter
- Part of: Air Combat Command
- Garrison/HQ: Montgomery Air National Guard Base
- Engagements: European Theater of Operations
- Decorations: Distinguished Unit Citation

Insignia
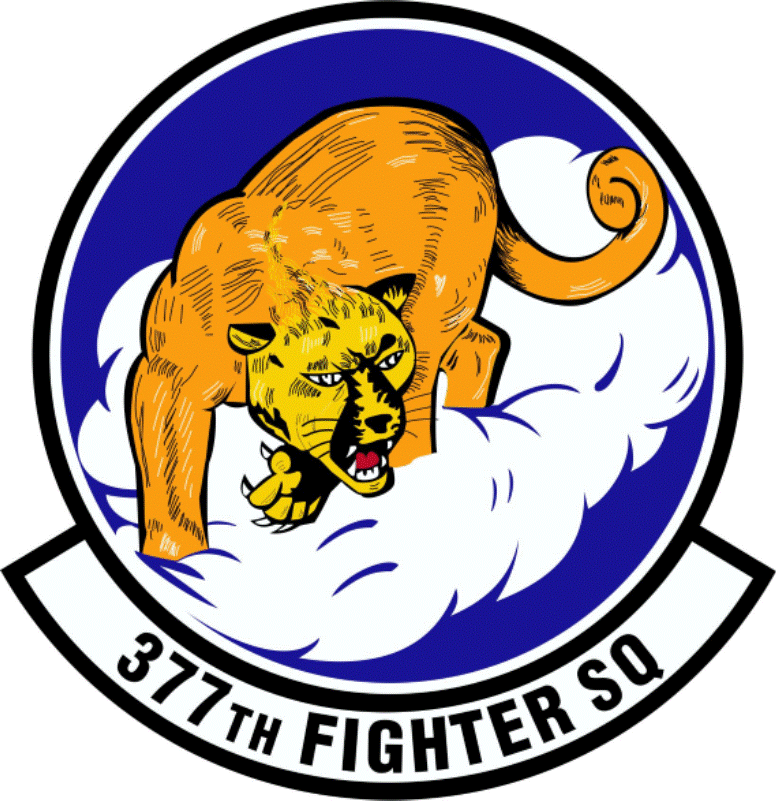
- 377th Fighter Squadron emblem

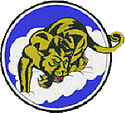
- 377th Fighter Squadron emblem (World War II) (Note: Approved 25 August 1943.)
- World War II fuselage code: E4

Aircraft flown
- Fighter: P-47 Thunderbolt; P-51 Mustang; F-16 Fighting Falcon; F-35 Lightning II

The 377th Fighter Squadron is a United States Air Force active duty unit stationed at Montgomery Air National Guard Base, Alabama. It is an Active Associate Unit administratively assigned to the 495th Fighter Group at Shaw Air Force Base, South Carolina and integrated operationally with the 100th Fighter Squadron of the Alabama Air National Guard’s 187th Fighter Wing.

The squadron was first activated in March 1943 as one of the original squadrons of the 362d Fighter Group. After training in the United States, the squadron deployed to the European Theater of Operations later that year. The squadron began combat operations in February 1944 and moved to the continent following D-Day, moving forward to Germany as American forces advanced. It continued combat operations with Republic P-47 Thunderbolts until V-E Day, earning two Distinguished Unit Citations. It returned to the United States in September 1945 and had begun training with the North American P-51 Mustang at Biggs Field, Texas, when it was inactivated in August 1946 and its personnel and equipment transferred to another unit.

== World War II ==
The 377th Fighter Squadron was established on 1 March 1943 at Westover Field, Massachusetts as part of the 362nd Fighter Group, equipped with Republic P-47D Thunderbolt. A year later, on 8 February 1944 they deployed to the European Theater of Operations (ETO) for combat as a part of the Ninth Air Force in England. There they remained engaged in combat operations until 1 May 1945.

On 9 September 1945 they were reassigned back to the United States and assigned to First Air Force at Seymour Johnson Field, North Carolina, while being programmed for deployment to Okinawa to take part in the planned Invasion of Japan. As a result of the Atomic bombings of Hiroshima and Nagasaki and the sudden end of the Pacific War, the deployment plans were canceled, however the unit was retained as part of the Second Air Force under Continental Air Forces and reassigned to Biggs Field, Texas, where they were equipped with the North American P-51 Mustang. The 377th Fighter Squadron was later Inactivated on 1 August 1946 due to postwar budget restrictions.

== Active associate unit ==
The squadron was reactivated at Montgomery Air National Guard Base during a ceremony on 17 October 2014, replacing Detachment 100 of the 495th Fighter Group. As an Active Associate Unit it is part of the "Total Force Integration" initiative whereby Regular Air Force personnel work side-by-side with host Air National Guard personnel in a to share resources, reduce duplication of effort, and increase the Air Force's ability to provide combat airpower.

== Lineage ==
- Constituted as the 377th Fighter Squadron on 11 February 1943
- Activated on 1 March 1943
- Inactivated on 1 August 1946
- Activated on 7 November 2015

=== Assignments ===
- 362d Fighter Group, 1 March 1943 – 1 August 1946
- 495th Fighter Group, 7 November 2015 – present

=== Stations ===
- Westover Field, Massachusetts, 1 March 1943
- Bradley Field, Connecticut, 21 June 1943
- Suffolk County Army Air Field, New York, 16 September 1943
- Mitchel Field, New York, 7 October 1943
- RAF Wormingford (AAF-159), England, 30 November 1943
- RAF Headcorn (AAF-412), England, 15 April 1944
- Lignerolles Airfield (A-12), France, 7 July 1944
- Rennes/St-Jacques Airfield (A-27), France, 12 August 1944
- Prosnes Airfield (A-79), France, 22 September 1944
- Verdun Airfield (A-82), France, 22 November 1944
- Frankfurt/Rhine-Main Airfield (Y-73), Germany, 14 April 1945
- Fürth/Industrieflughafen Airfield (R-30), (Note: Not to be confused with the nearby Fürth Airfield (R-28).) Germany, 2 May 1945
- Illesheim Airfield (R-10), Germany, 4 May 1945
- AAF Station Straubing (R-68), Germany, 15 May 1945
- Seymour Johnson Field, North Carolina, 9 September 1945
- Biggs Field, Texas, 6 December 1945 – 1 August 1946
- Montgomery Air National Guard Base, Alabama, 7 November 2015 – present

=== Aircraft ===
- Republic P-47D Thunderbolt, 1943 – 1945
- North American P-51H Mustang, 1945 – 1946
- General Dynamics F-16 Fighting Falcon, 2015 – 2023
- Lockheed Martin F-35 Lightning II, 2023 - present

=== Awards and campaigns ===
Award streamer	Award	Dates	Notes
	Distinguished Unit Citation	25 August 1944	Brest, France
	Distinguished Unit Citation	16 March 1945	Moselle-Rhine River Triangle

Campaign Streamer	Campaign	Dates	Notes
	Air Offensive, Europe	20 November 1943 – 5 June 1944	
	Air Combat, EAME Theater	20 November 1943 – 11 May 1945	
	Normandy	6 June 1944 – 24 July 1944	
	Northern France	25 July 1944 – 14 September 1944	
	Rhineland	15 September 1944 – 21 March 1945	
	Ardennes-Alsace	16 December 1944 – 25 January 1945	
	Central Europe	22 March 1944 – 21 May 1945	
