= 378th Fighter Squadron =

378th Fighter Squadron

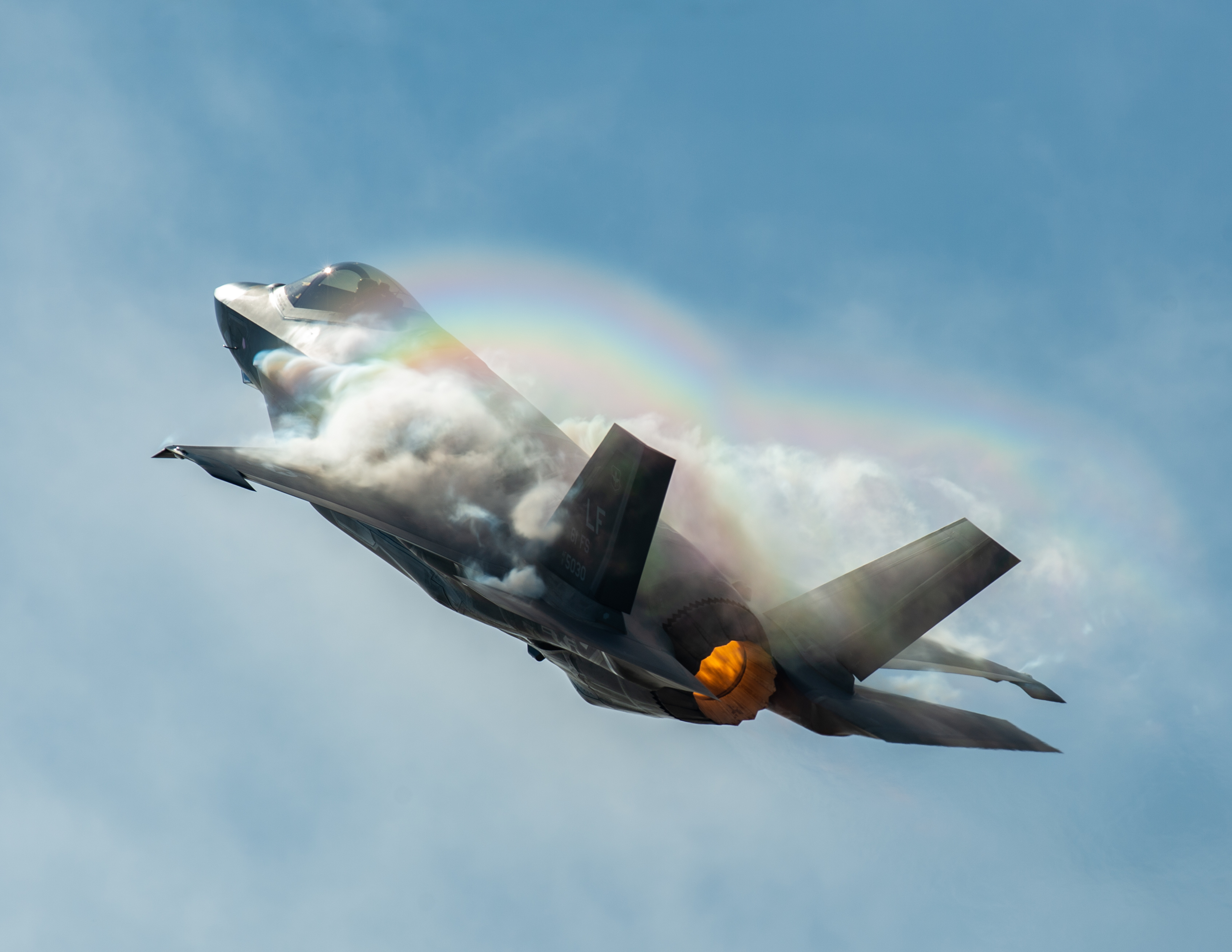
- 378th Fighter Squadron F-35 Lightning II, 2022
- Active: 1943–1946; 2015–present
- Country: United States
- Branch: United States Air Force
- Role: Fighter
- Part of: Air Combat Command
- Garrison/HQ: Truax Field Air National Guard Base
- Nickname(s): "Gundogs"
- Decorations: Distinguished Unit Citation

Insignia
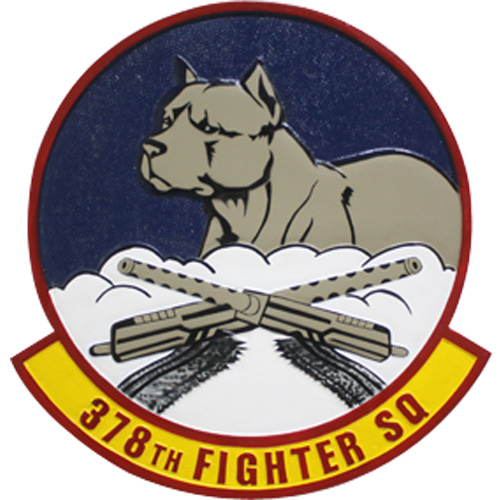
- 378th Fighter Squadron emblem

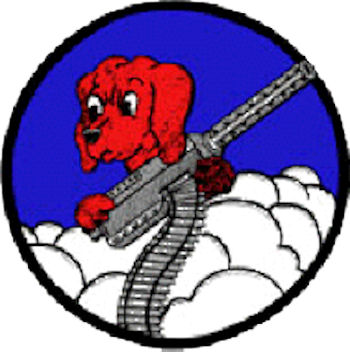
- 378th Fighter Squadron emblem (World War II)

Aircraft flown
- Fighter: F-15C Eagle, F-16 Fighting Falcon, F-35 Lightning II

The 378th Fighter Squadron is an active duty fighter squadron in the United States Air Force whose mission is to fly, maintain and support F-16 and F-35 aircraft. It is assigned to the 495th Fighter Group, of Air Combat Command and is stationed at Dane County Regional Airport-Truax Field, Wisconsin. It was last activated on 8 November 2015.

== History ==
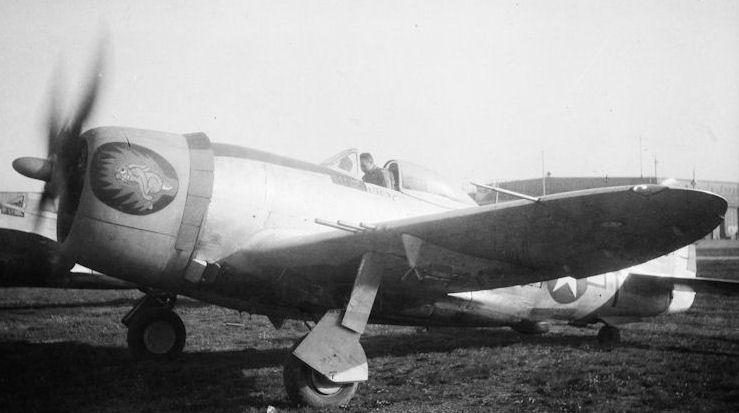
378th Fighter Squadron P-47D Thunderbolt

Established on 1 March 1943 at Westover Field, Massachusetts as the 362d Fighter Group, equipped with Republic P-47 Thunderbolts. Deployed to the European Theater of Operations and assigned to Ninth Air Force in England. Engaged in combat operations until May 1945.

Returned to the United States in August–September 1945, and assigned to First Air Force at Seymour Johnson Field, North Carolina, being programmed for deployment to Okinawa to take part in the planned Invasion of Japan. As a result of the Atomic bombings of Hiroshima and Nagasaki and the sudden end of the Pacific War, the deployment plans were canceled, however the unit was retained as part of the Second Air Force under Continental Air Forces and reassigned to Biggs Field, Texas, being equipped with North American P-51 Mustangs. Inactivated on 1 August due to postwar budget restrictions.

== Active Associate Unit ==
In 2008, Air Force leadership recognized that the changing force structure demanded creative ways to generate experienced fighter pilots. The solution was to capitalize on the experience and assets of the Guard and Reserve. This Total Force Integration initiative became Active Association, whereby Regular Air Force personnel work side-by-side with host Air Reserve and Air National Guard Component units in a mutually beneficial relationship. Total Force Integration is a vital enterprise aimed at maximizing the combined contributions of the Active and Reserve components, while ensuring "right-sizing" of component mix. The 378th Fighter Squadron will continue to lead the Air Force's pilot absorption efforts and the partnerships will allow active-duty and Air National Guard fighter units to share resources, reduce duplications of effort, and ultimately, increase the Air Force's overall air defense capabilities in order to enhance the ability to provide dominant combat airpower for America.

=== Lineage ===
- Constituted as the 378th Fighter Squadron on 11 February 1943

Activated on 1 March 1943
Inactivated on 1 August 1946
Activated on 8 November 2015

=== Assignments ===
- 362d Fighter Group, 1 March 1943 – 1 August 1946
- 495th Fighter Group, 8 November 2015

=== Stations ===
- Westover Field, Massachusetts, 1 March 1943
- Bradley Field, Connecticut, 22 June 1943
- Groton Field, Connecticut, 2 August 1943
- Mitchel Field, New York, 19 October – 12 November 1943
- RAF Wormingford (AAF-159), England, 30 November 1943
- RAF Headcorn (AAF-412), England, 13 April 1944
- Lignerolles Airfield (A-12), France, 2 July 1944
- Rennes/St-Jacques Airfield (A-27), France, 10 August 1944
- Prosnes Airfield (A-79), France, 19 September 1944
- Verdun Airfield (A-82), France, 5 November 1944
- Frankfurt/Rhine-Main Airfield (Y-73), Germany, 8 April 1945
- Furth/Industriehafen Airfield (R-30), Germany, 30 April 1945
- Illesheim Airfield (R-10), Germany, 3 May 1945
- AAF Station Straubing, Germany, 12 May–August 1945
- Seymour Johnson Field, North Carolina, 5 September 1945
- Biggs Field, Texas, 3 December 1945 – 1 August 1946
- Truax Field Air National Guard Base, Wisconsin, 8 November 2015 – present

=== Aircraft ===
- Republic P-47D Thunderbolt, 1943–1945
- North American P-51H Mustang, 1945–1946
- F-15 Eagle, 2015–2023
- F-16 Fighting Falcon, 2015–Present
- F-35 Lightning II, 2022–Present
