= Morton D. Magoffin =

American air force colonel and fighter ace (1916-2007)

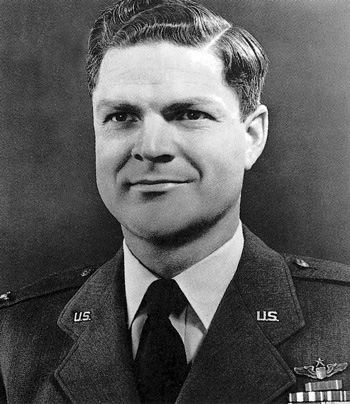
- Born: February 1, 1916; Deerwood, Minnesota, U.S.
- Died: July 10, 2007 (aged 91); Pleasanton, California, U.S.
- Military career
- Allegiance: United States
- Branch: United States Army Air Corps; United States Army Air Forces; United States Air Force
- Service years: 1937–1958
- Rank: Colonel
- Nickname: Mort
- Unit: 362nd Fighter Group
- Commands: 362nd Fighter Group; 57th Fighter Group; Air Base Defense School; 6171st Air Base Wing; 6147th Tactical Control Group
- Conflicts: World War II
- Awards: Distinguished Service Cross; Silver Star; Distinguished Flying Cross; Purple Heart; Air Medal (17)

Morton David Magoffin (February 1, 1916 – July 10, 2007) was a United States Air Force colonel and a World War II flying ace. He flew P-47 Thunderbolts with the 362nd Fighter Group in Europe.

== Life and career ==
=== Early life ===
Magoffin was born on 1916 in Deerwood, Minnesota. After graduating from Crosby-Ironton High School on May 31, 1933, he entered the United States Military Academy in West Point as a cadet in 1933 and graduated in 1937.

On October 20, 1937, Magoffin received his pilot's wings after completing flight school at Kelly Field in Texas. He was first assigned to the 1st Pursuit Group at Selfridge Field in Michigan, where he flew Seversky P-35s. He was then assigned as a pursuit pilot with the 15th Pursuit Group in Hawaii, where he served until December 1942. During this time, he witnessed the Japanese attack on Pearl Harbor on December 7, 1941, and then served as an observer on board the aircraft carrier USS Enterprise (CV-6) during the Doolittle Raid on April 18, 1942.

=== World War II ===
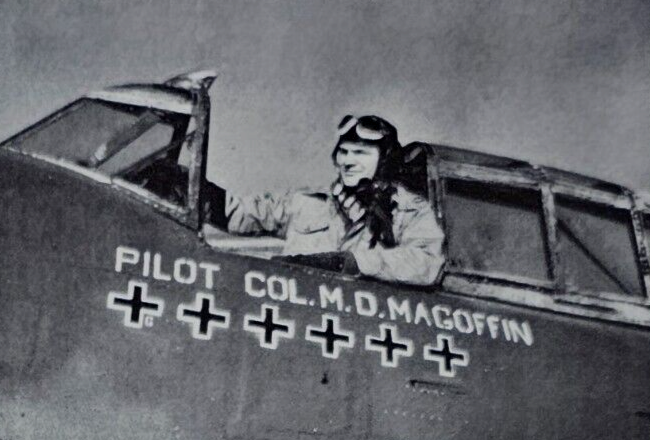
Magoffin onboard his P-47

Magoffin was then assigned to the 326th Fighter Group. In January 1943, he was then transferred to the 359th Fighter Group and in March 1943, he was assigned as commander of the 362nd Fighter Group at Westover Field in Massachusetts. After completion of training stateside, the unit was assigned to the Ninth Air Force in Europe and was stationed at RAF Wormingford in Essex, England, flying P-47 Thunderbolts. On February 8, 1944, the unit flew its first mission, accompanying B-24 Liberators that struck V-weapon launching locations close to Pas-de-Calais, France. The 362nd FG main activities up to April 1944 was escorting bombers and striking communication installations in France and Belgium in anticipation of the impending invasion of Normandy.

On April 24, 1944, during an escort mission of bombers to attack Luftwaffe aerodromes in southern Germany, Magoffin shot down a Messerschmitt Bf 109, his first aerial victory. Following the invasion of Normandy in June 1944, the unit moved to Lignerolles Airfield, an advanced landing ground in Lower Normandy, France. On July 8, he shot down a Focke-Wulf Fw 190, his second aerial victory.

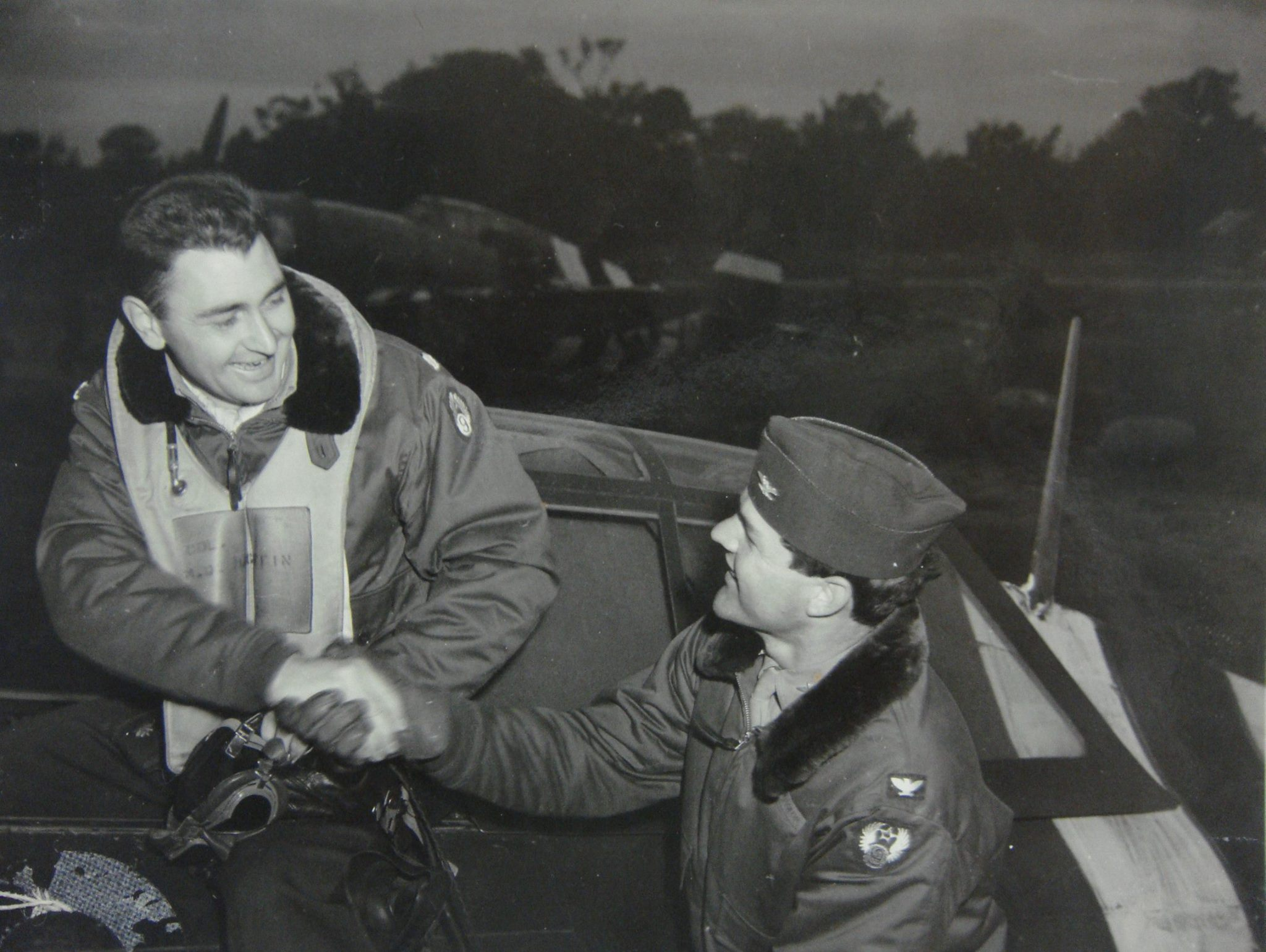
Magoffin (right) shaking hands with Major Joe Laughlin

On July 13, 1944, while leading his fighter squadron on a combat mission, Magoffin was returning to Lignerolles Airfield with his supply of gasoline almost exhausted, when he observed a flight of Fw 190s in front and 1,000 feet above him. He signaled one of his flight leaders to join him in attacking the enemy and ordered the rest of the squadron to continue to the airfield. In the ensuing combat, Magoffin shot down two Fw 190s in less than five minutes while his wingman shot down two more. A hit from a 20 mm shell crippled the wingman's P-47, causing him to fly at a reduced speed and low altitude through flak and small arms fire. Magoffin drew attention away from his wingman's P-47 by exposing himself as a target. Although his plane was hit repeatedly and his engine failed just as he reached the airstrip, he landed safely at Lignerolles. Magoffin was awarded the Distinguished Service Cross for his actions.

On July 31, he shot down an Fw 190 near Beaumont-Hamel, France, his fifth victory, earning him the title of flying ace. On August 10, 1944, while he was flying his 85th mission, his P-47 was hit by anti-aircraft fire. After completing the bombing run, he was unable to control the plane due to injuries he suffered after being struck by shrapnel. He then bailed out of his P-47 and floated down where his parachute hung up in an oak tree. He was extricated by German soldiers and was taken to a hospital in Etain, France. Due to the advance of American troops in France, he was moved to a hospital in Paris. Following the liberation of Paris in August, he was found by American troops. He was then taken to a field hospital and evacuated to England, where he had to undergo additional surgeries to remove shrapnel.

During the war, Magoffin flew a total of 85 combat missions and was credited with destroying five enemy airplanes. The younger pilots in his fighter unit considered him as a difficult commander whose focus on mission accomplishment was often at the expense of compassion for his pilots. They resented Magoffin for his belittling approach to discipline. On one occasion, he forced three veteran pilots to sprint around the airfield perimeter because they failed to salute him. In another episode, Magoffin noticed a group of men lining up for the cafeteria too early. As punishment, he gave them a close order drill before making the men wait in formation until the rest of the group was served.

=== Post war ===
After World War II, Magoffin served in several U.S. Air Force roles. He was Director of Plans and Operations at Alaskan Air Command at Fort Richardson in Alaska, until November 1947, then commanded the 57th Fighter Group there until January 1949, and briefly acted as deputy commander of the 57th Fighter Wing until March 1949. He attended the Air War College in Alabama from July 1949 to July 1950, followed by a staff position at the Pentagon until May 1952 and a short role with the Inspector General's planning group until September 1952. He led the Air Base Defense School at Parks Air Force Base in California, from September 1952 to January 1955. In South Korea, from February 1955 to January 1956, he commanded the 6171st Air Base Wing and 6147th Tactical Control Group, and served as deputy commander of the 314th Air Division at Osan Air Base.

His last role was executive officer of the 3535th Navigator Training Wing at Mather Air Force Base in California, from January 1956 to August 1957. After hospitalization at Parks Air Force Base due to injuries he sustained during World War II, he retired from the Air Force for medical reasons at the rank of colonel on March 18, 1958. Magoffin was married twice and had three daughters from his first marriage, and numerous grand and great-grandchilden. He died on July 10, 2007, after a lengthy illness at his home in Pleasanton, California, at the age of 91.

== Awards and decorations ==

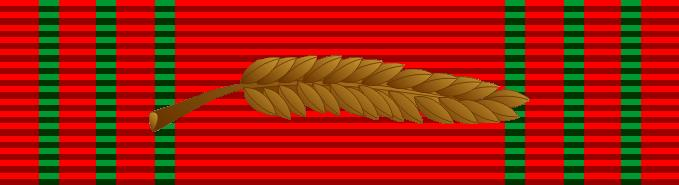

USAF Command Pilot Badge
Distinguished Service Cross		Silver Star
Distinguished Flying Cross	Purple Heart	Air Medal with three silver and one bronze oak leaf clusters
Air Force Presidential Unit Citation	Prisoner of War Medal	American Defense Service Medal with service star
American Campaign Medal	Asiatic–Pacific Campaign Medal with bronze campaign star	European-African-Middle Eastern Campaign Medal with three bronze campaign stars
World War II Victory Medal	National Defense Service Medal	Korean Defense Service Medal (Note: As Magoffin was stationed in South Korea from 1955 to 1956, this award was retroactively awarded when it was created in 2004.)
Air Force Longevity Service Award with four bronze oak leaf clusters	Croix de Guerre with Palm (France)	Croix de Guerre with Palm (Belgium)

=== Distinguished Service Cross citation ===

Magoffin, Morton David
Colonel, U.S Army Army Air Forces
362nd Fighter Group, 9th Air Force
Date of Action: July 13, 1944
Headquarters, U.S. Strategic Forces in Europe, General Orders No. 4 (January 8, 1945)
Citation:

The President of the United States of America, authorized by Act of Congress July 9, 1918, takes pleasure in presenting the Distinguished Service Cross to Colonel (Air Corps) Morton David Magoffin, United States Army Air Forces, for extraordinary heroism in connection with military operations against an armed enemy while serving as Pilot of a P-47 Fighter Airplane and Commanding Officer of the 362d Fighter Group, Ninth Air Force, in aerial combat against enemy forces in the European Theater of Operations on July 13, 1944. On this date, Colonel Magoffin was returning to a beachhead air strip in France with his supply of gasoline almost exhausted, when he observed a flight of FW 190 German fighter planes in front and 1,000 feet above him. Regardless of the odds against him, Colonel Magoffin unhesitatingly signaled for one of his flight leaders to join him in engaging the enemy and ordered the remainder of the squadron to continue to the beachhead. In the ensuing combat, Colonel Magoffin, displaying great skill and courage, destroyed two of the enemy planes while his wing pilot accounted for two more. At this time a direct hit from a 20 MM shell badly crippled the plane operated by Colonel Magoffin's companion, causing it to fly at a reduced rate of speed and at low altitude in the face of heavy flak and small arms fire. With complete disregard for his own safety, Colonel Magoffin drew attention from the damaged plane by dangerously exposing himself as a target. Although his plane was hit repeatedly and his engine failed just as he reached the airstrip, he succeeded in landing safely. The extraordinary heroism and outstanding leadership displayed by Colonel Magoffin on this occasion reflect great credit upon himself and the Armed Forces of the United States.
