= Richard Winslow "Dick" Schmidt =

American aviator

- Born: December 27, 1934 (age 91); Milwaukee, Wisconsin, USA
- Known for: American aviator: 26,673 flight hours in 34 different aircraft; Inductee in the Wisconsin Aviation Hall of Fame, 2019
- Spouse(s): Elizabeth Knapp, Sharon Tiglas
- Children: Dawn, Richard, Eric

Richard Winslow Schmidt (born December 27, 1934) is an American aviator with over 26,000 flight hours in 34 different types of aircraft, who has had exceptional career experiences in military, commercial, and home-built aircraft. He was inducted into Wisconsin Aviation Hall of Fame in 2019.

== Early life ==
Schmidt was the oldest of three children born to Burton Schmidt and Mary Ometz in Milwaukee, Wisconsin. Like many people during the Great Depression, his family was poor and they suffered personal hardships. As a child, Schmidt was inspired by the military pilots of World War II, and their heroic achievements helped him to define his values of responsibility, camaraderie, duty, and dedication to mission. He became interested in aviation at an early age and built model airplanes as his first educational experience into aircraft design and performance. He competed at many national events. After high school, while in a machine tool designer apprentice program, he also worked part time installing TV antennas. On a winter day, while working on an icy roof, an F-89 Scorpion roared overhead, and later he said that moment inspired him to pursue a career in aviation.

== Military career ==
Schmidt served in the United States Air Force and the Wisconsin Air National Guard 126th Fighter Interceptor Squadron and the 126th Air Refueling Squadron from 1956 to 1978. He was a Command Pilot and retired with the rank of Major. During a training exercise in 1957, he exceeded Mach 1 in an F-89. He was an Alert Duty pilot for two years and he participated in:

- Operation Dominic (1962): Temporarily assigned to 1211th Test Squadron, Kirtland AFB, New Mexico. He piloted a B-57 Canberra through atomic bomb clouds to collect air samples that were used to determine yield of the atomic bombs, near Christmas Island in the South Pacific.
- Operation Ready Go (1964): First all Air National Guard non-stop fighter deployment to Europe. Primary base was Lajes Field, Azores.
- Operation Creek Party (1967-1976): Air refueling support to USAF in Europe for tactical aircraft. Primary base was Rhein Main Air Base, Germany. His squadron completed over 6500 missions, off-loading 137 million pounds of fuel in over 42,000 hook-ups with aircraft from several NATO countries.

== Civilian aviation career ==
Schmidt was one of the first two pilots hired by Air Wisconsin (now United Express) in 1965, where he flew until he retired in 1992. During his flying at Air Wisconsin, he completed over 10,000 landings at Chicago's O’Hare Field. During one flight in a Beech 99, in 1971, there was a malfunction with the left, main landing gear due to a tire blow out during take-off, causing it to turn perpendicular to its intended orientation.

Schmidt instructed the emergency crew to foam only the left side of the runway, which allowed the malfunctioning landing gear to slide on the pavement but kept the functional main landing gear on dry pavement for directional control. There were no injuries and the passengers noted the smooth landing.

As a senior pilot at Air Wisconsin, he founded the Northern Professional Pilots Association. He served as its president for five years. While building a Pitts Special aerobatic biplane, he founded Experimental Aircraft Association (EAA) Chapter 444 in Appleton, Wisconsin, which provided a local gathering place for other home builders to share experiences, tips, tools and techniques.

In 1977, Don Quinn, the owner of the Don Q Inn in Dodgeville, Wisconsin purchased a C-97 that was once used in Ford-Mercury TV commercials with Farrah Fawcett. His intention was to convert it to a restaurant at his hotel, which was adjacent to a 2800' runway. The Phoenix Air National Guard crew delivering the aircraft flew over the airport, decided they could not land the airplane there, and took the airplane to Madison. After much deliberation and practice, Schmidt and his crew managed to land this airplane safely in Dodgeville. While the aircraft did not become a restaurant, it is still on display at the Don Q Inn.

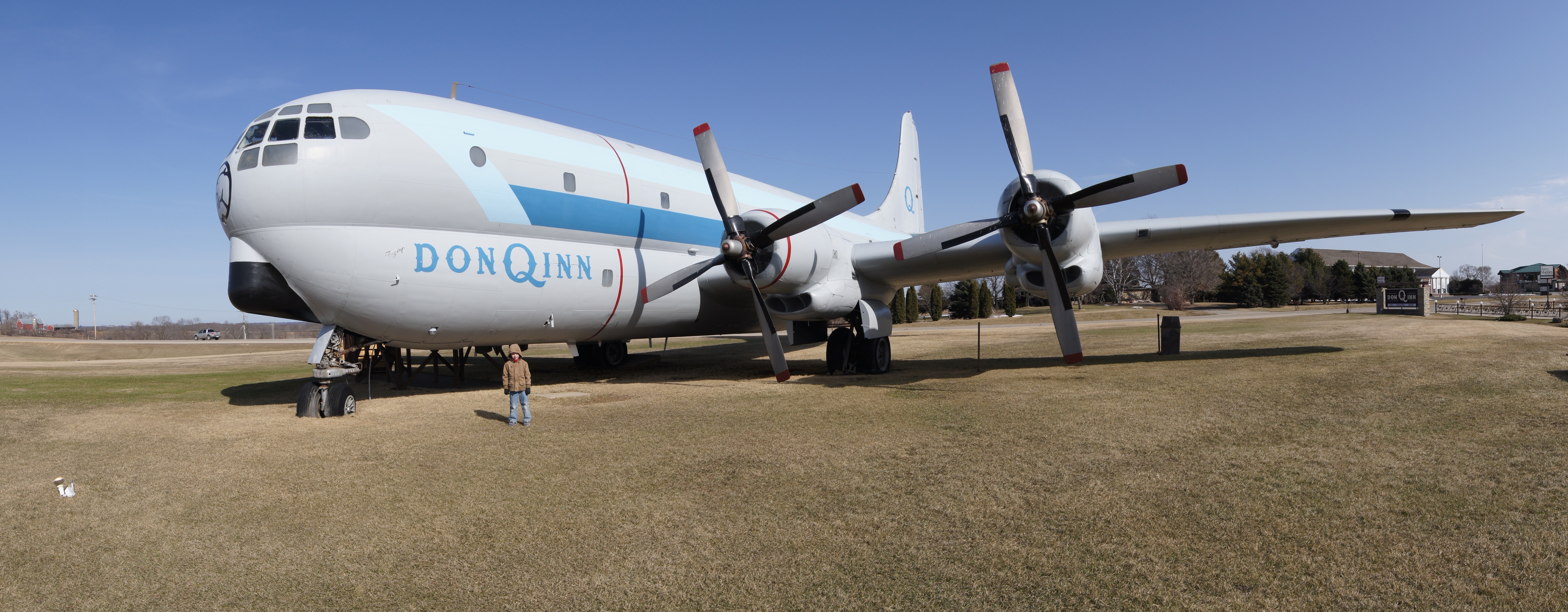
93,000-pound C-97 landed by Dick Schmidt on the 2800' runway adjacent to the Don Q Inn in Dodgeville, WI

During his career, Schmidt flew over 34 types of aircraft, including:

- Beech T-34
- North American T-28 Trojan
- Lockheed T-33 Shooting Star
- Northrop F-89 Scorpion (models C, D and J)
- Martin B-57 Canberra
- Boeing KC-97 (models G and L)
- DeHavilland DH-10 Dove
- Beech B-80 Queen Air
- DeHavilland DHC-6 Twin Otter
- Beech 99
- Swearingen SW-4 Metroliner
- DeHavilland Dash 7
- British Aerospace BAE-146
- Douglas DC-3
- 1931 Vintage Stinson SM-6000B Tri-Motor
- Pitts S-1S

== Personal life ==
Schmidt's interests over the years include hydroplane boat racing, sailing, and woodworking. In 1995 he sailed his 34' Crealock sailboat from San Francisco to Hawaii and back, logging more than 6300 miles in 51 days of sailing. He has three children from his first marriage with Betty (Knapp). He currently lives with his second wife Sharon (Tiglas) in Menasha, Wisconsin.

In 2018 he self-published his autobiography, Three Times He Cried. Schmidt was inducted into the Wisconsin Aviation Hall of Fame in 2019.

== See also ==
- Air National Guard
- Operation Dominic
- Air Wisconsin
- 126th Air Refueling Squadron
