= ILH =

ILH may refer to:

- Interscholastic League of Honolulu, a group of high school teams from Honolulu
- International League of Humanists, a non-profit international association
- Illesheim Army Heliport, IATA airport code ILH
