= Daniel S. Yenchesky =

American brigadier general

Daniel S. Yenchesky is a brigadier general and chief of staff of the Wisconsin Air National Guard. Other positions Yenchesky has held include commander of the 128th Air Refueling Wing. He is a graduate of the United States Air Force Academy.
