= 128th Air Refueling Wing =

128th Air Refueling Wing

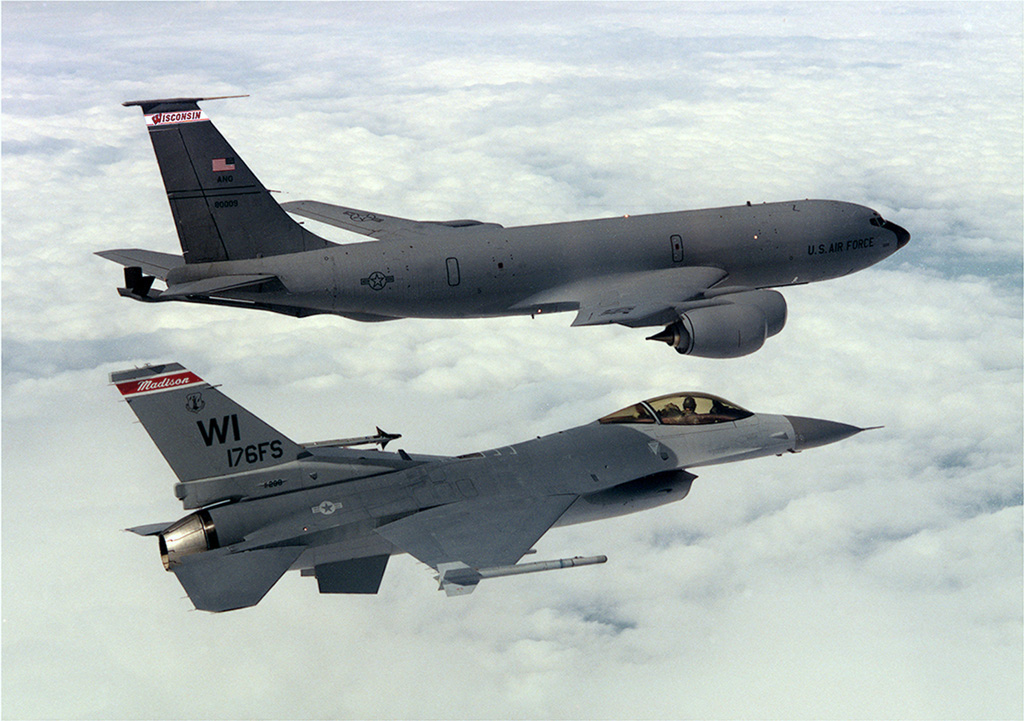
- A KC-135R Stratotanker from the 128th Air Refueling Wing and an F-16C fighter from the 115th Fighter Wing, Wisconsin Air National Guard fly in formation
- Active: 1943–1946; 1948–1952; 1952–present
- Country: United States
- Allegiance: Wisconsin
- Branch: Air National Guard
- Type: Wing
- Role: Aerial refueling
- Part of: Wisconsin Air National Guard
- Garrison/HQ: Milwaukee Mitchell International Airport Milwaukee, Wisconsin
- Engagements: European Theater of Operations
- Decorations: Distinguished Unit Citation

Commanders
- Current commander: Colonel Charles Merkel

Insignia
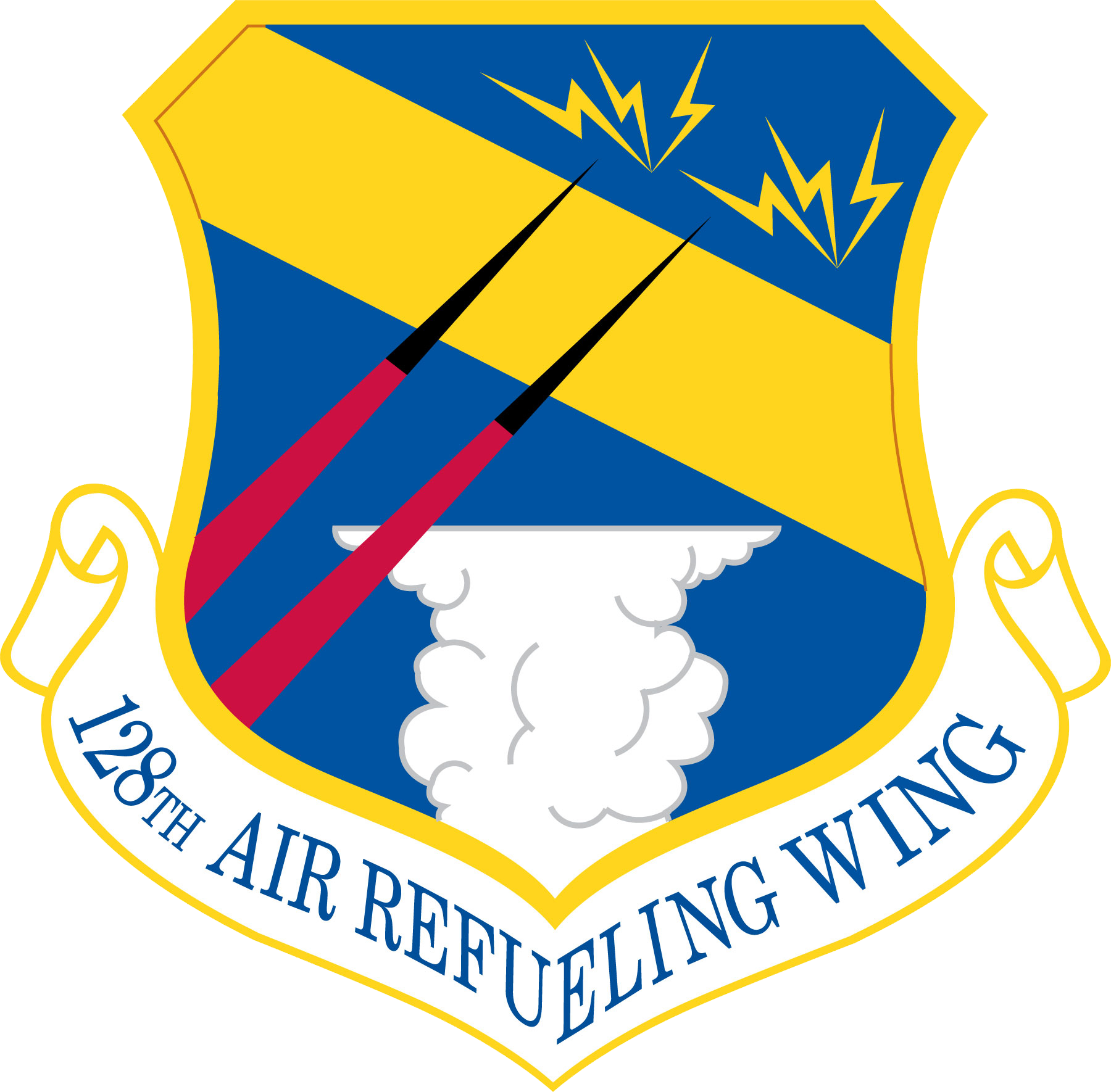
- 128th Air Refueling Wing emblem

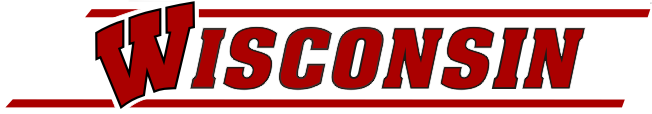
- Tail stripe

The 128th Air Refueling Wing is a unit of the Wisconsin Air National Guard, stationed at General Mitchell Air National Guard Base, Milwaukee, Wisconsin. If activated to federal service in the United States Air Force, the wing is operationally gained by the Air Mobility Command (AMC).

== Mission ==
The 128th Air Refueling Wing principal mission is air refueling. The wing enhances the Air Force's capability to accomplish its primary missions of Global Reach and Global Power. It also provides aerial refueling support to Air Force, Navy and Marine Corps aircraft as well as aircraft of allied nations. The wing is also capable of transporting litter and ambulatory patients using patient support pallets during aeromedical evacuations.

== Units ==
The 128th Air Refueling Wing consists of the following individual Units

- 128th Operations Group

126th Air Refueling Squadron

- 128th Mission Support Group
- 128th Maintenance Group
- 128th Medical Group

== History ==
=== World War II ===
The group was established in 1943 as the 362nd Fighter Group. Trained for combat with P-47's. Moved to England in November 1943. Assigned to Eighth Air Force. flew first mission, escorting B-24's that attacked V-weapon launching sites near Pas de Calais, on 8 February 1944. Until April 1944, engaged chiefly in escorting bombers that struck factories, railroads, airfields, and other targets on the Continent.

Reassigned to Ninth Air Force on 13 April 1944 and repeatedly attacked communications in northern France and in Belgium during Apr and May, in preparation for the invasion of Normandy.

Escorted C-47's that dropped paratroops over Normandy on 6 and 7 June Afterward, engaged primarily in interdictory and close-support activities, flying strafing and dive-bombing missions designed to assist the operations of ground forces. Moved to the Continent early in July 1944 and bombed enemy troops to aid the Allied breakthrough at St Lo later that month. Supported the subsequent advance of ground forces toward the Rhine by attacking railroads, trucks, bridges, power stations, fuel dumps, and other facilities.

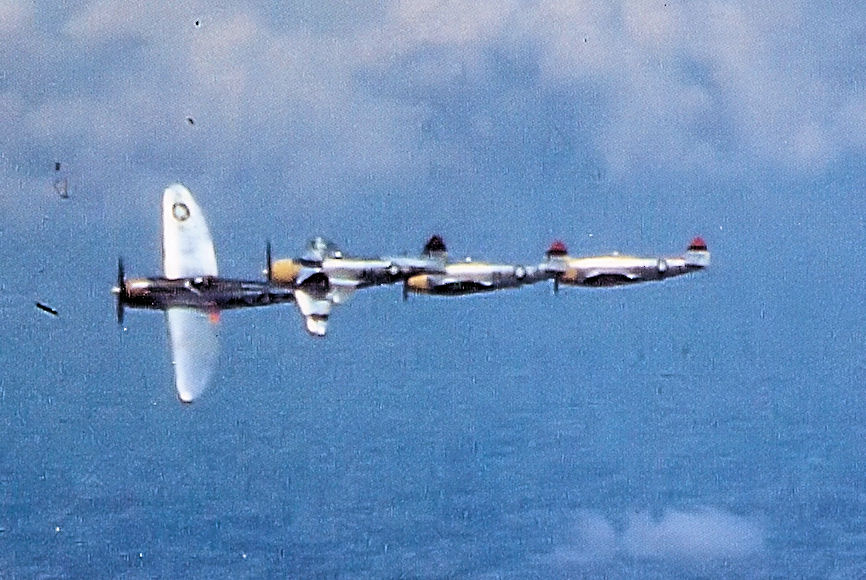
362d Fighter Group – P-47 Thunderbolts 1945

Received a DUC for a mission against the harbor at Brest on 25 August 1944 when, in spite of heavy overcast and intense enemy fire, the group attacked at low altitude, hitting naval installations, cruisers, troop transports, merchant vessels, and other objectives. Bombed and strafed such targets as flak positions, armored vehicles, and troop concentrations during the Battle of the Bulge, December 1944– January 1945.

Received second DUC for action over the Moselle-Rhine River triangle despite the intense antiaircraft fire encountered while flying armed reconnaissance in close cooperation with infantry forces in that area on 16 March 1945, the group hit enemy forces, equipment, and facilities, its targets including motor transports, armored vehicles, railroads, railway cars, and gun emplacements. Continued operations until May 1945 then was assigned to occupation duty.

The group was reassigned back to the United States in August–September 1945, and assigned to First Air Force at Seymour Johnson Field, North Carolina, being programmed for deployment to Okinawa to take part in the planned Invasion of Japan. As a result of the Atomic bombings of Hiroshima and Nagasaki and the sudden end of the Pacific War, the deployment plans were canceled, however the unit was retained as part of the Second Air Force under Continental Air Forces and reassigned to Biggs Field, Texas, being equipped with P-51 Mustangs.

The 362nd became one of the original groups of the postwar Tactical Air Command when the command was activated on 21 March 1946, however was inactivated on 1 August due to postwar budget restrictions.

=== Wisconsin Air National Guard ===
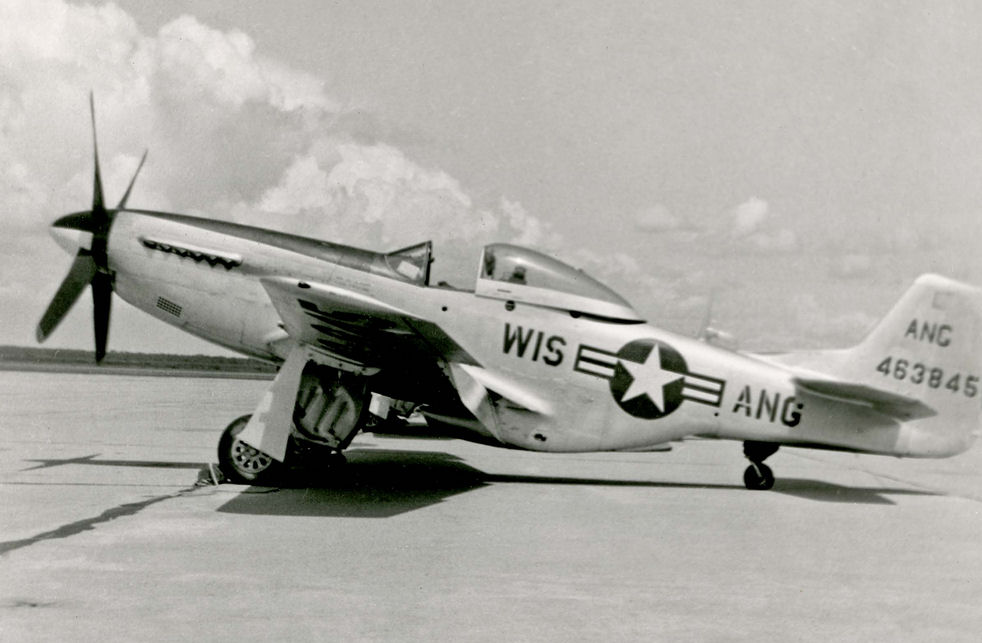
128th FIG North American F-51D-20-NA Mustang 44-64159, about 1949

The wartime 362d Fighter Group was re-designated as the 128th Fighter Group, and was allotted to the Wisconsin Air National Guard, on 2 August 1946. It was organized at General Mitchell Field, Milwaukee, Wisconsin and was extended federal recognition on 29 June 1948 by the National Guard Bureau. The 128th Fighter Group was bestowed the history, honors, and colors of the 362d.

The 126th Fighter Squadron and 176th Fighter Squadrons were assigned as the group's flying squadrons. Other squadrons assigned into the group were the 128th Headquarters, 128th Material Squadron (Maintenance), 128th Combat Support Squadron, and the 128th USAF Dispensary. The 176th FS operated from Truax Field, near Madison. The group was allocated to the Air Defense Command with a mission of air defense of the lower Great Lakes. It was re-designated as the 128th Fighter-Interceptor Group on 1 November 1950.

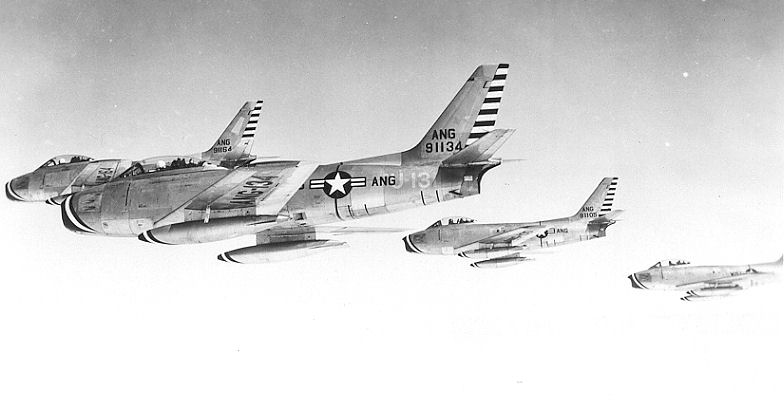
126th Fighter-Interceptor Squadron – F-86A Sabre formation, 1954

Federalized during the Korean War in February 1951, and was moved to Truax Field, Madison where both the 126th and 176th FIS flew air defense training missions under the ADC 30th Air Division until being inactivated in February 1952. It was returned to Wisconsin state control in February 1952. The group and 126th returned to Milwaukee. On 15 April 1956, the 176th FIS was authorized to expand to a group level, and the 115th Fighter-Interceptor Group was established by the National Guard Bureau. The 176th FIS becoming the group's flying squadron. The Group continued its air defense mission though the 1950s, being upgraded to F-86F Sabres in 1957, and dedicated F-89 Scorpion interceptors in 1961.

==== Air Refueling Mission ====
The 128th Fighter-Interceptor Wing was transferred to Strategic Air Command (SAC) on 1 August 1961 and was equipped with second-line KC-97 Stratofreighters. The 128th was the first Air National Guard tanker unit to become fully operational. This occurred in December 1963 when combat ready status was achieved. The group participated in a historic operation in a foreign land for a sustained period of time without a call up. The 128th ARG, along with four other Air National Guard refueling units, stationed a contingent of its KC-97's at Rhein-Main Air Base, West Germany. It was designated Operation "Creek Party" and was destined to last for 10 years. This operation began on 2 June 1967, when 24 Wisconsin Air Guard members departed for Germany.

In July 1976, the squadron received KC-135 Stratotankers; a newer and faster jet tanker. On 4 October 1976, the 126th completed its first mission with the new aircraft. After a year and a half of preparation, the conversion to KC-135s had begun. The first functional KC-135 arrived at Mitchell Field on 2 December 1977. In January 1979 the unit began the 24-hour-per-day Strategic Air Command (SAC) alert commitment. This commitment would be maintained for the next 12 years until President George Bush ended the SAC Alert Force in 1991.

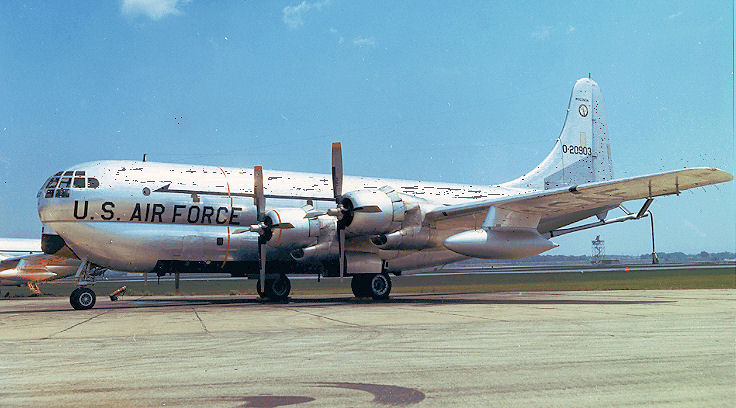
126th Air Refueling Squadron – Boeing KC-97L Stratotanker 52-903, 1970

The 1980s found the group involved in many training exercises as well as "real World" flying missions. In 1982 the unit converted to a newer version model aircraft—the KC-135E. In April 1983 the 128th Air Refueling Group was involved in the first Pacific Tanker Task Force, with flights to Guam, South Korea and Australia. Spring of 1984 brought a very large "first" for the 128th ARG. The unit participated in Coronet Giant, an exercise which entailed a direct flight from the United States to West Germany by 12, A-10 Thunderbolt II attack fighters, refueled along the way by three KC-135's from the 128th ARS. The route spanned 3600 miles, and was the largest mission of this type ever undertaken by a guard force.

A deployment to Wake Island was accomplished between 25 March and 3 April 1986 by aircraft and 130 personnel. A total of eight air refueling sorties were flown from Wake Island, with 458,000 pounds of fuel being off-loaded. Early Spring of 1987 saw another significant accomplishment by the squadron. On 21 March 1986 one aircraft departed Fargo, North Dakota, with 40 civilian VIP's on board. The destination: Tempelhof Central Airport, West Berlin. This was the first ever sanctioned Air National Guard civilian flight outside the Continental United States, and was also the first KC-135 authorized into West Berlin.

During Operation Desert Shield, the squadron received orders for a partial activation on 20 December 1990. All aircraft, aircrews and a number of support personnel were dispatched to the newest forward operating base at Cairo West Airport, Egypt on 27–29 December 1990. They became the basis for the 1706th Air Refueling Wing (Provisional). Other unit personnel were mobilized for use as stateside "backfill" (replacing troops sent forward) or sent to overseas destinations.

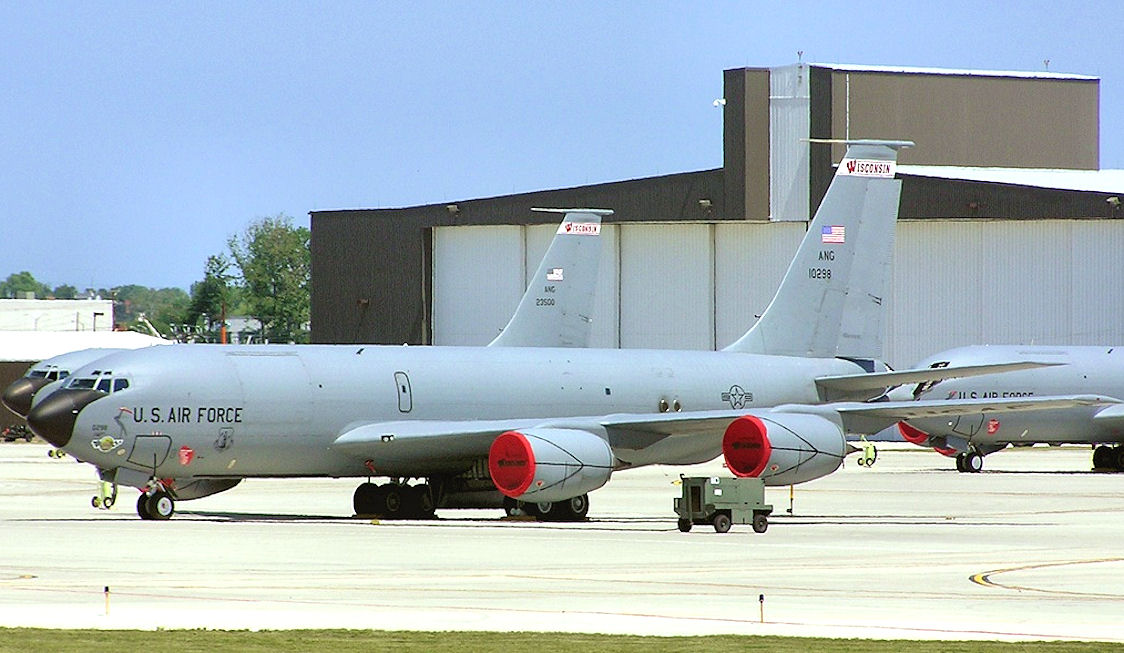
128th Air Refueling Wing KC-135s parked at General Mitchell ANGB

Conversion from KC-135E to KC-135R model aircraft began on 3 July 1991 when the 128th transferred aircraft to the Pennsylvania Air National Guard. The first permanently assigned KC-135R, arrived on 7 August 1991. The 128th ARG was the first Air National Guard or Air Force Reserve unit in the country to receive the "R" model tanker. The "E" model era came to an end on 9 February 1992.

Three aircraft and 47 volunteer guardmembers departed for Spain on 28 December 1992, in support of Operation Restore Hope. Our tankers became part of the Moron Tanker Task Force, based out of Moron Air Base, Spain. Over 16 million pounds of fuel were unloaded during the mission. The purpose of this humanitarian mission was to restore order and provide food and medical supplies needed to stop suffering in Somalia.

The 128th Air Refueling Group proved once again how capable the unit is at quickly deploying anywhere in the world. On 5 November 1993, four KC-135R's, along with 172 guardmembers deployed to Yokota Air Base, Japan. The deployment was designed to train American and Japanese Air Self Defense Forces for the defense of the Northern Japanese Islands, in the event of an attack by another country.

On 10 December 1993, the unit suffered a tragedy when a KC-135R, 57-1470, exploded while undergoing routine ground maintenance at General Mitchell Air National Guard Base due to an overheated fuel pump. Six NCO maintenance personnel were killed.

During a 24 February 1994 trip to the Azores the unit completed its first "roller mission". The steel rollers are placed on the floor of the aircraft making it very easy to load and unload cargo. This gave the aircraft a dual mission; refueling and cargo transport. This was a flight of firsts, not only did the 128th Air Refueling Group have its first roller mission, but their aircraft refueled a B-2 Stealth Bomber and a C-17, the newest Air Force Cargo hauler. On 16 October 1995 the 128th Air Refueling Group was redesignated as a Wing due to the Air National Guard Realignment Programming Plan. The gaining command of the 128th Air Refueling Wing was Air Mobility Command.

The 128 ARW joined an elite group of Air National Guard units in April 1996, when the KC-135 simulator became operational. The simulator allows the 128th flight crews to be trained more safely and at a lower cost than the KC-135 aircraft. During the month of July 1996 over 400 members of the 128th deployed to Pisa Air Base, Italy for Operation Decisive Endeavor. Over 5500 personnel from 13 NATO countries joined the 128th as part of IFOR (Implementation Force) air component. Unit members had the opportunity to perform their job during deployment rotations from 1 July – 3 August 1996. This deployment gave the 128th the opportunity to work with other tankers units from Mississippi and Nebraska, along with the Italian Air Force.

Soon after the summer flooding of 1997, portions of Southeastern Wisconsin were declared a federal disaster area by President Clinton. This opened the door for the Federal Emergency Management Agency to step in. Five unit members volunteered for the state activation in order to help process claims and checks to people whose lives were upended following the disastrous flash floods in the Milwaukee area.

On 30 April 1999, the 128 ARW was tasked for a Presidential Reserve Call Up due to the crisis in Kosovo. President William Clinton authorized the call up of 33,000 reserve personnel for up to 270 days. The 128 ARW and the 117 ARW (Alabama Air National Guard) deployed together, with a small contingent of Active Duty Air Force support personnel, to Europe to support Operation Allied Force.

=== Global War on Terrorism ===
Following the terrorist's attacks on the U.S., the 128 ARW was tasked to provide aerial refueling support for the countless fighter combat air patrols performed over major U.S. cities. Dubbed Operation Noble Eagle (ONE), the 128 ARW flew their first ONE mission on 12 September 2001. From Sep to Dec 2001, the 128ARW flew 64 sorties in 333.6 hours. A total of 100,956.6 pounds of fuel was off-loaded to 156 aircraft in support of ONE. The highest sortie production occurred in November when fighter combat air patrols occurred every four hours over most of the major U.S. cities. In addition to supporting ONE, the 128 ARW also provided support for Operation Enduring Freedom (OEF), deploying aircraft and personnel to Spain to support combat air operations from late Sep 2001 until the spring of 2002. Throughout 2002, most of the personnel assigned to the 128 Security Forces Squadron (SFS) were mobilized since 11 September 2001 in support of Operation Noble Eagle and Operation Enduring Freedom. Members were deployed to Bagram AB, Afghanistan, Guantanemo Bay, Cuba, Southwest Asia, and several Continental U.S. locations. In addition, three 128 SFS personnel deployed on numerous classified Raven missions throughout the entire year of 2002. No other unit assigned to the 128 ARW was tasked as much as the 128 SFS. The Wing also actively supported the Global War on Terrorism with aircraft, aircrew and support personnel both in CONUS and OCONUS.

=== Current operations ===
While the 128 ARW continued to support Operations Noble Eagle and Enduring Freedom during 2003, in March the unit also began major support of Operation Iraqi Freedom. The 128 ARW deployed to several different theaters of operation ranging from total bare base conditions to fully operational bases. The deployed unit members worked under various commanders, as well as commands, providing refueling support of combat air operations in Iraq. The 128 ARW, along with the 126th Air Refueling Squadron (ARS) were tasked to perform at a very high OPSTEMPO during 2004, deploying eight aircraft and 204 personnel to Istres AB, France in support of Operation Joint Forge (OJF). In addition, six unit members from the 128 Logistics Readiness Squadron (LRS) Ground Transportation unit deployed to Iraq to provide convoy security along with two members of the 128 Security Forces Squadron (SFS) who provided training for Iraqi police officers and the Iraqi Army.

The 128 ARW also had several 126 Weather Flight members deployed in various places throughout the globe, including: South America, Iraq, Afghanistan, and Qatar. The 128 ARW continues to support many on-going operations abroad, along with continuing its function at home.

=== Lineage ===
- Constituted as the 362d Fighter Group on 11 February 1943

Activated on 1 March 1943
Inactivated on 1 August 1946
Redesignated 128th Fighter Group and allotted to Wisconsin ANG on 2 August 1946
Extended federal recognition on 29 June 1948
Federalized and placed on active duty, 1 February 1951
Redesignated 128th Fighter-Interceptor Group on 1 February 1951
Inactivated on 6 February 1952
Returned to state control and activated on 1 November 1952
Redesignated 128th Fighter Group (Air Defense) on 15 April 1956
Redesignated 128th Air Refueling Group, Tactical on 1 August 1961
Redesignated 128th Air Refueling Group, Medium
Redesignated 128th Air Refueling Group, Heavy on 2 January 1978
Redesignated 128th Air Refueling Group on 16 March 1992
Redesignated 128th Air Refueling Wing on 16 October 1995

=== Assignments ===
- I Fighter Command, 1 March 1943

Attached to: Boston Air Defense Wing, 22 June – 19 October 1943
Attached to: New York Fighter Wing, 19 October – 12 November 1943

- 66th Fighter Wing, 30 November 1943
- 70th Fighter Wing

Attached to: IX Air Support Command, 13 April 1944

- 100th Fighter Wing

Attached to: XIX Tactical Air Command, 1 August 1944, August 1945

- First Air Force, 5 September 1945
- Second Air Force, 3 December 1945
- 66th Fighter Wing, 29 June 1948
- 126th Composite Wing, 1 November 1950
- 30th Air Division, 1 February 1951 – 1 November 1952
- Wisconsin Air National Guard, 1 November 1952 – Present

Gained by: Air Defense Command
Gained by: Tactical Air Command, 1 August 1961
Gained by: Strategic Air Command, 1 July 1976
Gained by: Air Combat Command, 1 June 1992
Gained by: Air Mobility Command, 1 June 1993–Present

=== Components ===
==== World War II ====
- 377th Fighter Squadron (E4): 10 February 1943 – 1 August 1946
- 378th Fighter Squadron (G8): 10 February 1943 – 1 August 1946
- 379th Fighter Squadron (B8): 10 February 1943 – 1 August 1946

==== Air National Guard ====
- 128th Operations Group, 16 October 1995 – present
- 126th Fighter Squadron (later 126th Fighter-Interceptor Squadron, 126th Air Refueling Squadron): 29 June 1948 – 6 February 1952, November 1952 – 16 October 1995
- 176th Fighter Squadron (later 176th Fighter-Interceptor) Squadron), 29 June 1948 – 15 April 1956

=== Stations ===
- Westover Field, Massachusetts, 1 March 1943
- Bradley Field, Connecticut, 22 June 1943
- Groton Field, Connecticut, 2 August 1943
- Mitchel Field, New York, 19 October – 12 November 1943
- RAF Wormingford (AAF-159), England, 30 November 1943
- RAF Headcorn (AAF-412), England, 13 April 1944
- Lignerolles Airfield (A-12), France, 2 July 1944
- Rennes/St-Jacques Airfield (A-27), France, 10 August 1944
- Prosnes Airfield (A-79), France, 19 September 1944
- Verdun Airfield (A-82), France, 5 November 1944
- Frankfurt/Rhine-Main Airfield (Y-73), Germany, 8 April 1945
- Furth/Industriehafen Airfield (R-30), Germany, 30 April 1945
- Illesheim Airfield (R-10), Germany, 3 May 1945
- AAF Station Straubing, Germany, 12 May–August 1945
- Seymour Johnson Field, North Carolina, 5 September 1945
- Biggs Field, Texas, 3 December 1945 – 1 August 1946.
- Billy Mitchell Field, Wisconsin, 25 June 1947 – Mar 1951
- Truax Field, Wisconsin, Mar 1951–31 Oct 1951.
- Billy Mitchell Field, Wisconsin, 1 November 1951

Designated: General Mitchell Air National Guard Base, Wisconsin, 1991–Present

=== Aircraft ===
- P-47 Thunderbolt, 1943–1945
- P-51 Mustang, 1945–1946
- F-51D Mustang, 1948–1949, 1952–1953
- F-80A Shooting Star, 1949–1952
- F-86A Sabre, 1953–1954
- F-89C Scorpion, 1954–1960
- F-89J Scorpion, 1960–1961
- KC-97G Stratofreighter, 1962
- KC-97F Stratofreighter, 1962–1965
- KC-97L Stratofreighter, 1965–1977
- KC-135A Stratotanker, 1977–1983
- KC-135E Stratotanker, 1983–1992
- KC-135R Stratotanker, 1991–present.
