= 343rd Reconnaissance Squadron =

U.S. Air Force unit based in Nebraska

343d Reconnaissance Squadron

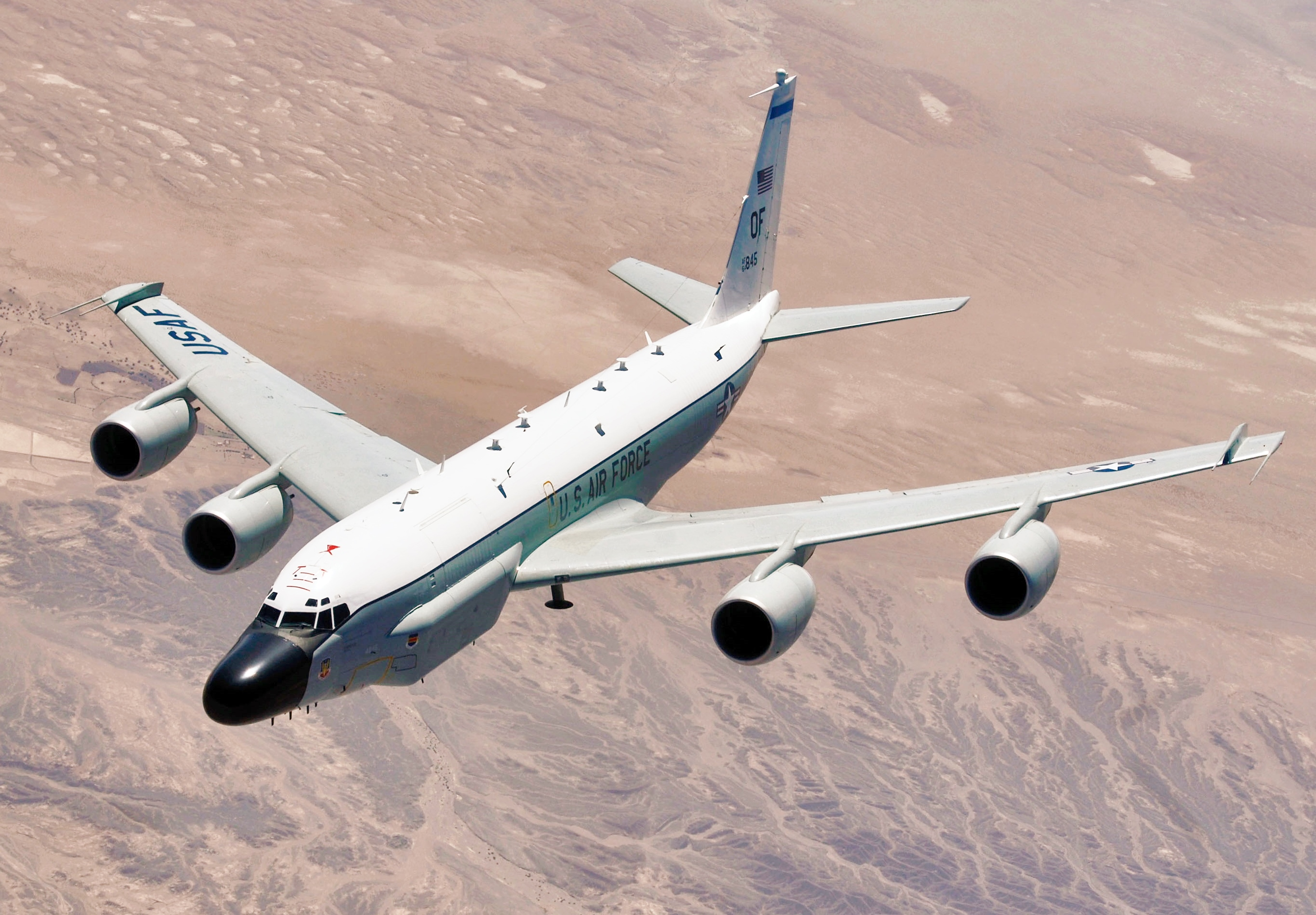
- Squadron RC-135 Rivet Joint on deployment
- Active: 1943–1946; 1947–1949; 1950–present
- Country: United States
- Branch: United States Air Force
- Role: Reconnaissance and Surveillance
- Part of: Air Combat Command
- Garrison/HQ: Offutt Air Force Base
- Decorations: Distinguished Unit Citation; Air Force Meritorious Unit Award; Air Force Outstanding Unit Award

Insignia
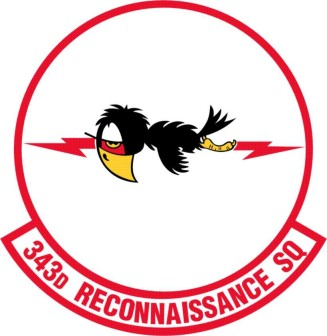
- 343d Reconnaissance Squadron emblem (Note: Approved 25 July 1952. The emblem as originally approved, was the crow and lightning bolt only. Maurer, combat Squadrons, p. 426. The disc and tab were added later.)

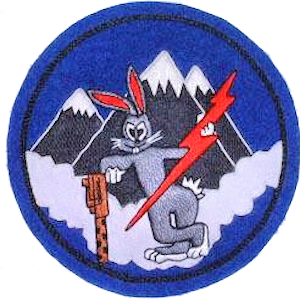
- 343d Fighter Squadron World War II emblem
- World War II fuselage code: CY

The 343d Reconnaissance Squadron is a United States Air Force unit part of the 55th Wing at Offutt Air Force Base, Nebraska. It operates the RC-135V/W Rivet Joint aircraft conducting reconnaissance missions.

== History ==
=== World War II ===
Constituted as 343 Fighter Squadron (Twin Engine), on 21 January 1943. Activated on 1 February 1943 at McChord Field, WA as a P-38 Lightning fighter squadron. Assigned to 55 Fighter Group. Redesignated as: 343 Fighter Squadron, Twin Engine, on 20 August 1943

Moved to Nuthampstead, England, 16 September 1943. The squadron was assigned to the Eighth AF. Began operations with P-38’s on 15 Oct 1943; moved to Wormingford, England, 16 April 1944 and converted to P-51’s in July 1944. Engaged primarily in escorting American bombers that attacked industrial targets and marshalling yards in Germany, and airfields and V-weapon sites in France. The 343rd provided cover for B-17’s and B-24’s that bombed aircraft plants during Big Week in February 1944 and gun emplacements during the St Lo breakthrough in July 1944.

The squadron also patrolled the sky over the English Channel and bombed bridges in the Tours area during the invasion of the Europe in June 1944; patrolled the Arnhem sector to support the airborne invasion of Holland in September 1944. Redesignated 343 Fighter Squadron, Single Engine, on 5 September 1944.

On 5 September 1944: Lieutenant William H. Allen, U.S. Army Air Corps, was a fighter pilot assigned to the 343rd Fighter Squadron, based at RAF Wormingford, Essex, England. After escorting a bombing mission to Stuttgart, Lt. Allen, flying his North American Aviation P-51D-5-NA Mustang, 44-14049, Pretty Patty II, and his flight, attacked an airfield north of Göppingen, Germany. Lieutenant Allen became an Ace in one day when he shot down five Heinkel He 111 bombers as they took off at two-minute intervals.

The fighters from the 343rd continued to escort bombers on raids on transportation facilities during the Battle of the Bulge, 1–4 December–January 1945.

The unit strafed trucks, locomotives, and oil depots near Wesel when the Allies crossed the Rhine in March 1945. The 343d flew combat missions in the European Theater of Operations until 21 April 1945. Moved to Kaufbeuren, Germany, 20 July 1945. Inactivated on 20 August 1946.

=== Cold War ===
Redesignated as 343 Reconnaissance Squadron, Very Long Range, Mapping, on 5 February 1947. Activated on 24 Feb 1947. Redesignated as 343 Strategic Reconnaissance Squadron, Photo-Mapping, on 29 June 1948. Inactivated on 14 October 1949. Redesignated as 343 Strategic Reconnaissance Squadron, Medium, Electronics, on 27 October 1950. Activated on 1 November 1950. Assigned to the 55 Strategic Reconnaissance Wing on 16 June 1952.

Redesignated as: 343 Strategic Reconnaissance Squadron, Medium, on 15 July 1954; 343 Strategic Reconnaissance Squadron on 16 August 1966 at Offutt AFB, NE and converted to RC-135 in 1967. Redesignated as: 343rd Reconnaissance Squadron on 1 September 1991.

It conducted aerial photography from 1947–1949 and global strategic reconnaissance from 1950 to 1979.

Since 1979 the squadron has provided worldwide strategic reconnaissance support, including operations in Grenada in 1983, Libya in 1986, and Southwest Asia from 1990-1991. On 29 July 1953 a squadron RB-50 temporarily attached to the 91st Strategic Reconnaissance Squadron was shot down by Soviet fighters about ninety miles south of Vladivostok. The Soviet Union did not deny the plane's location was over international waters, but claimed that the bomber had twice flown over Soviet territory and fired on their MiGs, who then returned fire defensively.

== Lineage ==
- Constituted as the 343d Fighter Squadron (Twin Engine) on 21 January 1943

Activated on 1 February 1943
Redesignated 343d Fighter Squadron, Twin Engine on 20 August 1943
Redesignated 343d Fighter Squadron, Single Engine on 5 September 1944
Inactivated on 20 August 1946
Redesignated 343d Reconnaissance Squadron, Very Long Range, Mapping on 5 February 1947
Activated on 24 Feb 1947
Redesignated 343d Strategic Reconnaissance Squadron, Photo-Mapping on 29 June 1948
Inactivated on 14 October 1949
Redesignated 343d Strategic Reconnaissance Squadron, Medium, Electronics on 27 October 1950
Activated on 1 November 1950
Redesignated 343d Strategic Reconnaissance Squadron, Medium on 15 July 1954
Redesignated 343d Strategic Reconnaissance Squadron on 16 August 1966
Redesignated 343d Reconnaissance Squadron on 1 September 1991

=== Assignments ===
- 55th Fighter Group, 1 February 1943 – 20 August 1946
- 55th Reconnaissance Group (later 55 Strategic Reconnaissance Group), 24 February 1947 – 14 October 1949

Attached to 55th Strategic Reconnaissance Wing, 19 July - 26 October 1948

- 55th Strategic Reconnaissance Group, 1 November 1950

Attached to 91st Strategic Reconnaissance Wing until 3 January 1951
Attached to 55th Strategic Reconnaissance Wing after 4 January 1951

- 55th Strategic Reconnaissance Wing, 16 June 1952
- 55th Operations Group, 1 September 1991 – present

=== Stations ===
- McChord Field, Washington, 1 February - 22 August 1943
- RAF Nuthampstead (AAF-131), England, 16 September 1943
- RAF Wormingford (AAF-159), England, 16 April 1944
- AAF Station Kaufbeuren, Germany, c. 20 July 1945
- AAF Station Giebelstadt, Germany, 30 April - 20 August 1946
- MacDill Field (later MacDill Air Force Base), Florida, 24 February 1947
- Topeka Air Force Base (later Forbes Air Force Base), Kansas, 30 June 1948 – 14 October 1949
- Barksdale Air Force Base, Louisiana, 1 November 1950
- Ramey Air Force Base, Puerto Rico, 3 January 1951
- Forbes Air Force Base, Kansas, 10 October 1952

Deployed at Ben Guerir Air Base, French Morocco, 30 May 1955 – 8 August 1955

- Offutt Air Force Base, Nebraska, 16 August 1966 – present

=== Aircraft ===
- Lockheed P-38 Lightning (1943–1944)
- North American P-51 Mustang (1944–1946)
- Lockheed P-80 Shooting Star (1946)
- F-2 Expeditor (1947, 1948)
- FB-17 Flying Fortress (1947–1948)
- Boeing F-9 Flying Fortress (1947–1948)
- RB-17 Flying Fortress (1948–1949)
- Boeing RB-29 Superfortress (1948–1949, 1950–1951)
- TB-29 (1949)
- Boeing RB-50 Superfortress (1951–1954)
- Douglas C-47 Skytrain (1953–1954)
- Boeing LB-29 Superfortress (1954)
- Boeing KB-29 Superfortress (1954)
- Boeing RB-47 Stratojet (1954–1967)
- Boeing EB-47 Stratojet (1957–1967)
- Boeing RC-135 (1967–present)

=== Operations ===
- World War II
- Operation Urgent Fury
- Operation El Dorado Canyon
- Operation Desert Storm
