= RAF Headcorn =

Former Royal Air Force Advanced Landing Ground

RAF Headcorn USAAF Station AAF-412 Egerton
- Near Headcorn, Kent in England
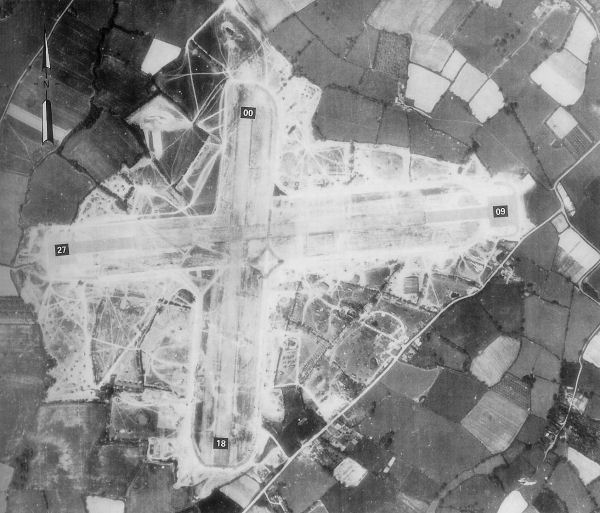
- Headcorn ALG airfield, 11 May 1944

Site information
- Type: RAF Advanced landing ground
- Owner: Air Ministry
- Operator: Royal Air Force 1943; United States Army Air Forces 1943-44
- Controlled by: RAF Fighter Command

Location
- Shown within Kent RAF Headcorn (the United Kingdom)
- Coordinates: 51°10′58″N 000°41′16″E

Site history
- Built: 1943
- Built by: RAF Airfield Construction Service
- In use: July 1943 – September 1944
- Battles/wars: European theatre of World War II

Airfield information
Runways
Direction	Length and surface
09/27	Sommerfeld Tracking
18/36	Sommerfeld Tracking

Royal Air Force Headcorn or more commonly known as RAF Headcorn is a former Royal Air Force Advanced landing ground located 2 miles (3.2 km) northeast of Headcorn, Kent, England.

Opened in 1943, Headcorn was a prototype for the temporary Advanced Landing Ground airfields to be built in France after D-Day, when the need for advanced landing fields became urgent as the Allied forces moved east across France and Germany. It was used by the Royal Air Force and the United States Army Air Forces. It was closed in September 1944 and has now reverted to farmland.

== Units ==
Two Canadian squadrons, 403 Squadron RCAF and 421 Squadron RCAF, were based at Headcorn from August to November 1943 with Supermarine Spitfire IXB's.

The following units were also here at some point:

- No. 17 (Fighter) Wing RAF (August - October 1943)
- No. 127 Airfield Headquarters RAF (August - October 1943)
- 362nd Fighter Group
  - 377th Fighter Squadron flying Republic P-47 Thunderbolts
  - 378th Fighter Squadron flying Republic P-47 Thunderbolts
  - 379th Fighter Squadron flying Republic P-47 Thunderbolts
- No. 405 Repair & Salvage Unit (August - September 1943)
- No. 2809 Squadron RAF Regiment
- 'B' Section of No. 3207 Servicing Commando (August - September 1943)

== See also ==
- List of former Royal Air Force stations
