= 126th Air Refueling Squadron =

Wisconsin Air National Guard unit

126th Air Refueling Squadron

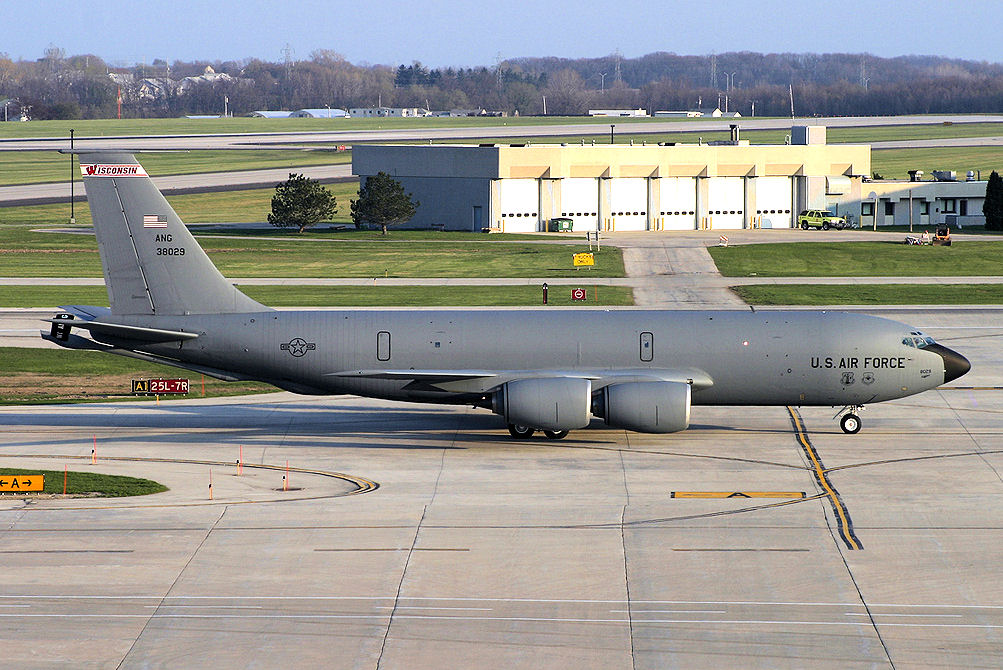
- 126th Air Refueling Squadron – KC-135R 63-8029
- Active: 1940–1942; 1943–1945; 1947–1952; 1952–present
- Country: United States
- Allegiance: Wisconsin
- Branch: Air National Guard
- Type: Squadron
- Role: Aerial refueling
- Part of: Wisconsin Air National Guard
- Garrison/HQ: General Mitchell Air National Guard Base, Wisconsin
- Engagements: Antisubmarine Campaign European Theater of Operations
- Decorations: Distinguished Unit Citation

Insignia
- 126th Air Refueling Squadron emblem (Note: Approved 3 April 1954.)

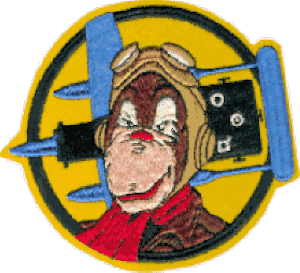
- 34th Photographic Reconnaissance Squadron emblem

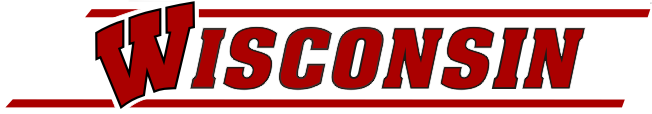
- Tail stripe

The 126th Air Refueling Squadron is a unit of the 128th Air Refueling Wing of the Wisconsin Air National Guard stationed at General Mitchell Air National Guard Base, Wisconsin. The 126th is equipped with the KC-135R Stratotanker.

The squadron was first organized in the Wisconsin National Guard as the 126th Observation Squadron in 1940. It is one of 29 National Guard Observation Squadrons formed before World War II.

== History ==
=== World War II ===
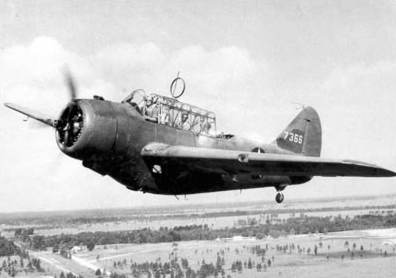
126th Observation Squadron O-47 (Note: Aircraft is North American O-47A serial 37-365. Unlike most prewar observation squadrons, the 126th was not assigned to a National Guard division, but was assigned to support the II Army Corps and performed various duties, including photographing portions of the Carolina Maneuvers in the autumn of 1941.)

The squadron was first organized as the 126th Observation Squadron in November 1940 as part of the build-up of the United States military after the Fall of France. The 126th trained for reconnaissance with the Wisconsin National Guard. The squadron was called to active service in June 1941 and moved to Hyannis Army Air Field, Massachusetts. After the Japanese attack on Pearl Harbor, the squadron performed antisubmarine patrols off the New England coast, using a variety of single engine observation aircraft. In October 1942, as two and four engine bombers took over more of the antisubmarine mission, the squadron moved to Birmingham Army Air Field, Alabama, where it was inactivated and its personnel dispersed to other units.

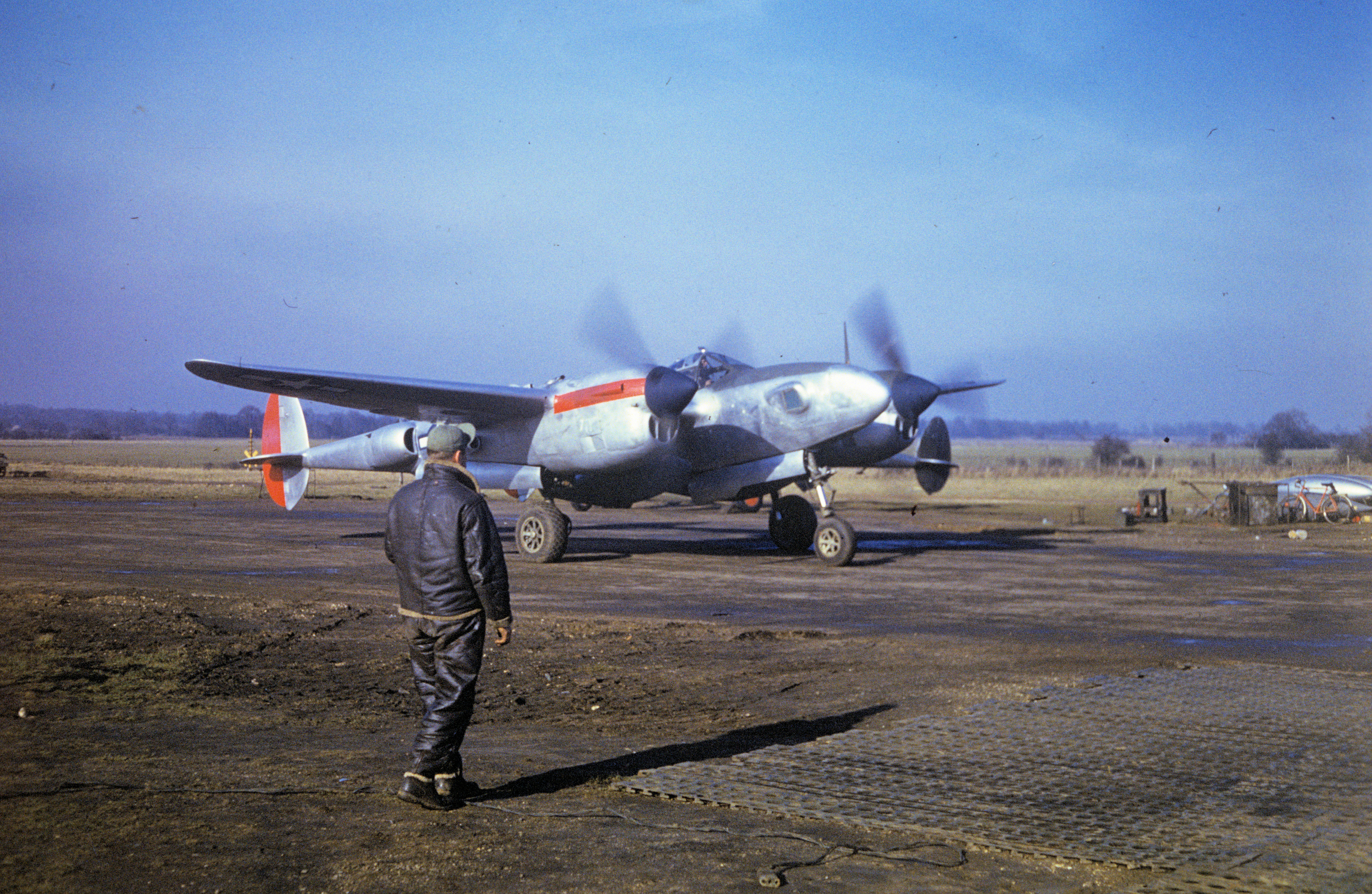
F-5 Lightning at Chalgrove

The squadron was reactivated at Fort Myers Army Air Field, Florida as part of Third Air Force in March 1943 and initially trained, as the 126th Reconnaissance Squadron to be a tactical reconnaissance squadron. In August, its mission changed to photographic reconnaissance and it was redesignated the 34th Photographic Reconnaissance Squadron and converted to the Lockheed P-38 Lightning high speed reconnaissance aircraft. The unit deployed to the European Theater of Operations, where it became part of Ninth Air Force in England. The squadron performed aerial reconnaissance of enemy-held territory in Occupied Europe prior to the Normandy Invasion. It supported Operation Overlord, the Normandy invasion in June 1944 by performing visual and photographic reconnaissance of bridges, artillery, road and railway junctions, traffic centers, airfields, and other targets.

The squadron moved to France in August 1944, aiding the United States Third Army and other Allied organizations in the liberation of France and the battle to breach the Siegfried Line by flying reconnaissance missions in the combat zone. It flew reconnaissance missions over Germany from January 1945 to V-E Day, assisting the advance of Third Army across the Rhine, to Czechoslovakia and into Austria. It had moved forward to Fürth Airfield, Germany by the time hostilities ended. It then became part of the United States Air Forces in Europe and part of the occupation forces in Germany and was inactivated at Fürth in November 1945.

=== Wisconsin Air National Guard ===
==== Air Defense Command ====
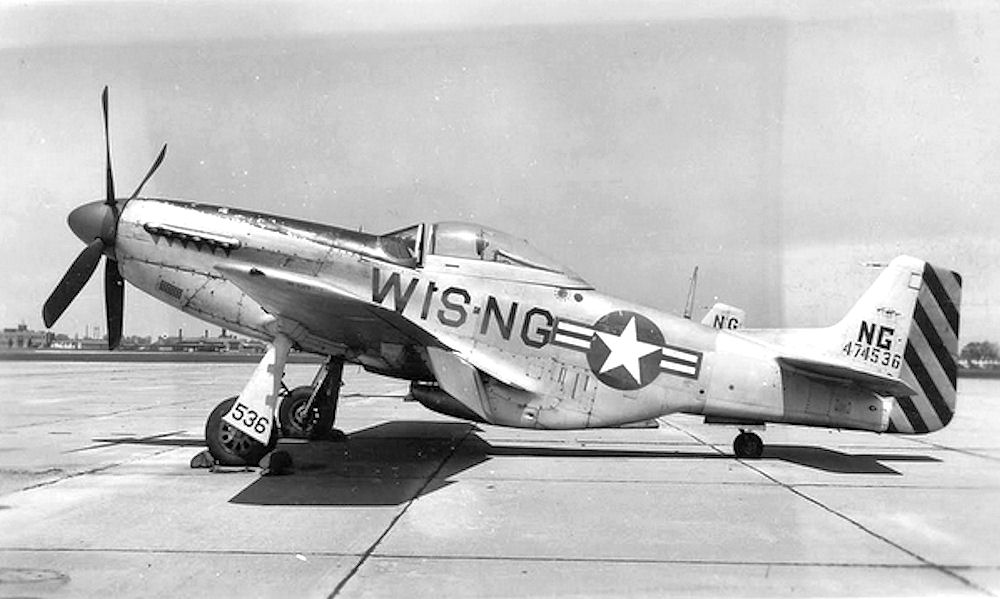
126th Fighter Squadron F-51 (Note: Aircraft is North American F-51D Mustang serial 44-74536, taken in 1948.)>

The wartime 34th Photographic Reconnaissance Squadron was redesignated the 126th Fighter Squadron and allotted to the National Guard on 24 May 1946. It was organized at General Mitchell Field, Milwaukee, Wisconsin and extended federal recognition on 25 June 1947. The squadron was assigned to the newly formed 128th Fighter Group and equipped with North American F-51D Mustangs.

The squadron upgraded to Lockheed F-80A Shooting Star jet aircraft in 1949. The squadron was federalized during the Korean War on 1 March 1951 and Was redesignated the 126th Fighter-Interceptor Squadron the following day. The 126th moved to Truax Field, Madison where it flew air defense missions. In February 1952. As part of a major Air Defense Command (ADC) reorganization that replaced its fighter wings with regional air defense wings, responding to ADC's difficulty under the existing wing base organizational structure in deploying fighter squadrons to best advantage, the squadron's parent 128th Fighter-Interceptor Group was inactivated and the squadron was reassigned to the 31st Air Division. In April, the unit converted to North American F-86 Sabres and flew them until it was released from active duty and inactivated on 1 December 1952.

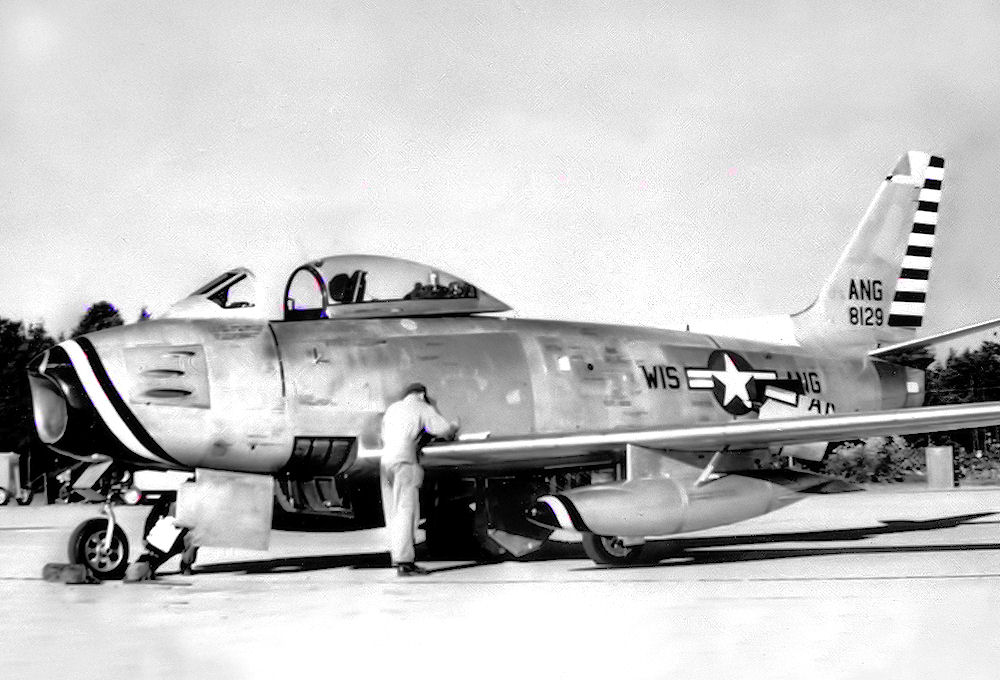
126th Fighter-Interceptor Squadron F-86A (Note: Aircraft is North American F-86A Sabre serial 48-129, taken in 1953.)

The squadron was activated in the Wisconsin Air National Guard the same day and began to equip with the earlier F-86A model of the Sabre. It continued its air defense mission though the 1950s, being upgraded to radar equipped Northrop F-89 Scorpion interceptors in 1954. Its initial equipment was the 20mm cannon armed F-89C, but in 1960 it upgraded to the F-89J, which was armed with the AIR-2 Genie and equipped with data link or interception control through the Semi-Automatic Ground Environment system.

==== Air refueling ====
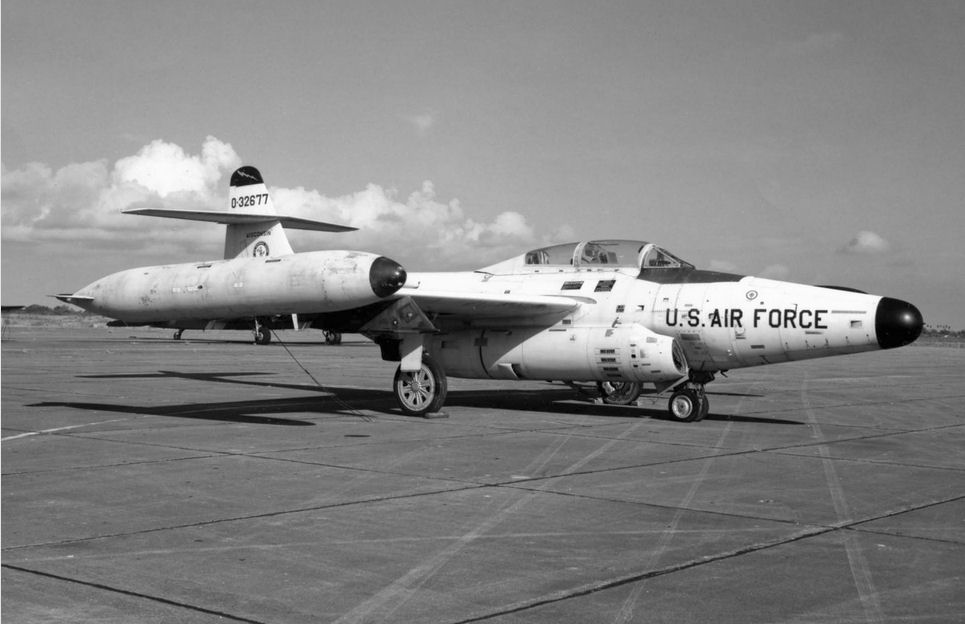
F-89 of the Wisconsin ANG (Note: Aircraft is Northrop F-89J Scorpion serial 53-2686.)

The squadron was designated the 126th Air Refueling Squadron and, along with its parent group, equipped with Boeing KC-97 Stratofreighters. The 126th was the first Air National Guard tanker unit to become fully operational. This occurred in December 1963. The squadron participated in a historic operation in a foreign land, when on 2 June 1967, members of the squadron and its support units deployed for a sustained period of time without being mustered into federal service. The 126th, along with four other Air National Guard refueling units, stationed a contingent of KC-97s at Rhein-Main Air Base, West Germany. European deployments, designated Operation Creek Party, were destined to last for 10 years.

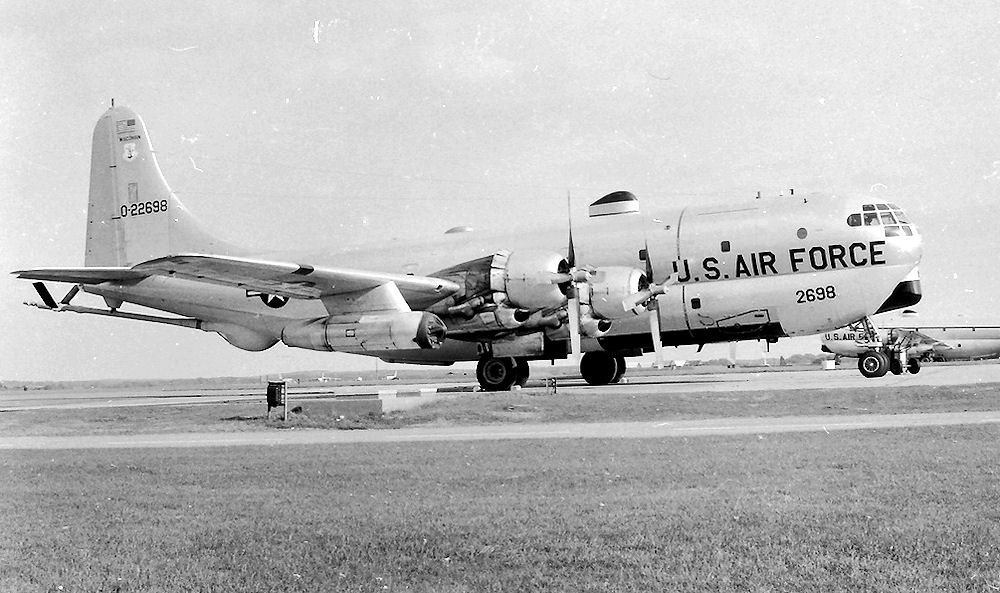
126th Air Refueling Squadron KC-97 (Note: Aircraft is Boeing KC-97L-26-BO Stratotanker serial 52-2698, taken in 1966.)

In 1976, the squadron began conversion to the Boeing KC-135 Stratotankers, a newer and faster jet tanker. On 4 October 1976, the 126th completed its first mission with the new aircraft and became fully operational with the KC-135 on 2 December 1977. In January 1979 the unit began a 24-hour-per-day Strategic Air Command (SAC) alert commitment. This commitment would be maintained for the next 12 years until President Bush ended the SAC alert in 1991.

In 1982 the unit converted to a newer model of the Stratotanker, the KC-135E, with more fuel efficient turbofan engines. In April 1983 the 126th Air Refueling Squadron was involved in the Pacific Tanker Task Force, with flights to Guam, South Korea and Australia. In the spring of 1984 the unit participated in Operation Coronet Giant, an exercise which entailed a direct flight from the United States to West Germany by 12 Fairchild Republic A-10 Thunderbolt II attack fighters, refueled along the way by three squadron KC-135s. The route spanned 3600 miles, and was the largest mission of this type undertaken by a National Guard force to date. On 21 March 1986 a unit aircraft departed Fargo, North Dakota, with 40 civilian VIP's on board for Tempelhof Central Airport in West Berlin. This was the first Air National Guard flight transporting civilians outside the Continental United States, and was also the first KC-135 authorized to fly into West Berlin through the Berlin Corridors.

During Operation Desert Shield, the squadron was partially activated on 20 December 1990. All aircraft, aircrews and a number of support personnel were dispatched to Cairo West Air Base, Egypt between 27 and 29 December 1990. They became the basis for the 1706th Air Refueling Wing (Provisional). Other unit personnel were mobilized to replace troops sent forward or for other overseas destinations.

==== Post-Cold War era ====
Three aircraft and 47 volunteer guard members departed for Moron Air Base, Spain on 28 December 1992 in support of Operation Restore Hope, a humanitarian mission to restore order and provide food and medical supplies to Somalia. At Moron the planes became part of the Moron Tanker Task Force. Over 16 million pounds of fuel were unloaded during the deployment.

During a 24 February 1994 trip to the Azores the unit performed its first "roller mission." Steel rollers were placed on the floor of squadron aircraft making to facilitate loading and unloading cargo. The KC-135 always had a dual mission; refueling and transport, but this modification improved the KC-135's cargo handling capability. On this flight squadron aircraft refueled a Northrop Grumman B-2 Spirit stealth bomber and a Boeing C-17 Globemaster III for the first time.

During July 1996 squadron members deployed to Pisa Airport, Italy for Operation Decisive Endeavor, the American contribution to the United Nations peace enforcement force in Bosnia and Herzegovina. Over 5,500 personnel from 13 NATO countries formed the Implementation Force (IFOR) air component. Unit members performed deployment rotations from 1 July to 3 August 1996. The 126th had the opportunity to work with tanker units from Mississippi and Nebraska, along with the Italian Air Force.

On 30 April 1999, the 126th Squadron was called to active duty due to the crisis in Kosovo. President Clinton authorized the call for 33,000 reserve personnel to be placed on active duty for up to 270 days. The squadron and elements of the 117th Air Refueling Wing of the Alabama Air National Guard deployed together to Europe to support Operation Allied Force, the North Atlantic Treaty Organization military operation against Serbian forces in Kosovo.

==== Global War on Terrorism ====
Following the terrorist attacks on the United States the squadron was tasked to provide air refueling support for fighter combat air patrols over major U.S. cities. Dubbed Operation Noble Eagle (ONE), the 126th flew its first ONE mission on 12 September 2001. From September to December 2001, the squadron flew 64 sorties and offloaded over 100,000 pounds of fuel to 156 aircraft. The highest sortie rate occurred in November when fighter combat air patrols occurred every four hours over most of the major U.S. cities. In addition to supporting ONE, the 126th also provided support for Operation Enduring Freedom, deploying aircraft and personnel to Spain to support combat air operations from late September 2001 until the spring of 2002. In 2004, it deployed eight aircraft and 204 personnel to Istres-Le Tubé Air Base, France in support of Operation Joint Forge, aimed at maintaining stability in Bosnia-Herzegovina.

== Lineage ==
- Constituted as the 126th Observation Squadron and allotted to the National Guard on 30 July 1940

Activated on 12 November 1940
Ordered into active service on 2 June 1941
Redesignated 126th Observation Squadron (Light) on 13 January 1942
Redesignated 126th Observation Squadron on 4 July 1942
Inactivated on 18 October 1942

- Activated on 1 March 1943

Redesignated 126th Reconnaissance Squadron (Fighter) on 2 April 1943
Redesignated 34th Photographic Reconnaissance Squadron on 11 August 1943
Inactivated on 22 November 1945

- Redesignated 126th Fighter Squadron, Single Engine and allotted to the National Guard on 24 May 1946
- Organized on 3 February 1947

Extended federal recognition on 25 June 1947
Redesignated 126th Fighter Squadron, Jet c. 1 November 1949
Federalized and placed on active duty, 1 March 1951
Redesignated 126th Fighter-Interceptor Squadron on 2 March 1951
Inactivated and returned to Wisconsin state control on, 1 December 1952
Activated on 1 December 1952
Redesignated 126th Air Refueling Squadron, Tactical on 1 August 1961
Redesignated 126th Air Refueling Squadron, Medium c. 1968
Redesignated 126th Air Refueling Squadron, Heavy on 1 January 1978
Redesignated 126th Air Refueling Squadron on 1 August 1961

=== Assignments ===
World War II

- Wisconsin National Guard, 12 November 1940
- II Army Corps, 2 June 1941
- 59th Observation Group, 1 September 1941 – 18 October 1942
- 59th Observation Group (later 59th Reconnaissance Group), 1 March 1943
- III Reconnaissance Command, 11 August 1943
- 8th Photographic Reconnaissance Group, 9 October 1943
- III Reconnaissance Command, 15 January 1944
- 10th Photographic Group, 31 March 1944
- XII Tactical Air Command, 3 October 1944 (attached to Provisional Reconnaissance Group, 16 October 1944)
- 69th Tactical Reconnaissance Group (later 69th Reconnaissance Group), 20 April 1945
- 10th Reconnaissance Group, 11 July – 22 November 1945

Wisconsin Air National Guard

- 128th Fighter Group, 25 June 1947
- Wisconsin Air National Guard, 1 February 1951
- Tenth Air Force, 1 March 1951
- 133d Fighter Group, March 1951
- 128th Fighter-Interceptor Group), March 1951
- 31st Air Division, 6 February 1952 – 1 December 1952
- 128th Fighter-Interceptor Group (later 128th Fighter Group, 128th Fighter-Interceptor Group, 128th Air Refueling Group), 1 December 1952
- 128th Operations Group, 16 October 1995 – present

=== Stations ===
- Milwaukee, Wisconsin, 12 November 1940
- Fort Dix, New Jersey, 10 June 1941
- Hyannis Army Air Field, Massachusetts, 27 August 1941
- Birmingham Army Air Field, Alabama, 18 October 1942
- Fort Myers Army Air Field, Florida, 1 March 1943
- Thomasville Army Air Field, Georgia, 12 April 1943
- Peterson Field, Colorado, 29 August 1943
- Will Rogers Field, Oklahoma, 16 October 1943 – 12 March 1944
- RAF Chalgrove, England (Station 465), 29 March 1944
- Rennes Airfield (A-27), France, 11 August 1944
- Chateaudun Airfield (A-39), France, 25 August 1944
- St-Dizier Airfield (A-64), France, 12 September 1944
- Dijon Airfield (Y-9), France, 6 October 1944
- Nancy/Azelot Airfield (A-95), France, 3 November 1944
- Haguenau Airfield (Y-39), France, 3 April 1945
- Fürth Airfield (A-30), Germany, 15 July – 22 November 1945
- General Mitchell Field, Wisconsin, 1 February 1947

Truax Field, Wisconsin, 1 April – 1 December 1952

- General Mitchell Field (later General Mitchell Air National Guard Base), Wisconsin, 1 December 1952 – present

=== Aircraft ===
- North American O-47, 1940–1942
- Douglas O-46, 1941–1942
- Curtiss O-52 Owl, 1942
- O-49, 1941–1942
- O-59 Grasshopper, 1941–1942
- Lockheed F-5 Lightning, 1943–1945
- Lockheed F-4 Lightning, 1943–1945
- North American F-51D Mustang, 1948–1949, 1952–1953
- Lockheed F-80A Shooting Star, 1949–1952
- North American F-86F Sabre, 1952
- North American F-86A Sabre, 1953–1954
- Northrop F-89C Scorpion, 1954–1960
- Northrop F-89J Scorpion, 1960–1961
- Boeing KC-97G Stratotanker, 1962
- Boeing KC-97F Stratotanker, 1962–1965
- Boeing KC-97L Stratotanker, 1965–1977
- Boeing KC-135A Stratotanker, 1976–1983
- Boeing KC-135E Stratotanker, 1983–1992
- Boeing KC-135R Stratotanker, 1991–present

== See also ==
- List of observation squadrons of the United States Army National Guard
- List of Lockheed P-38 Lightning operators
- List of F-86 Sabre units
- F-89 Scorpion units of the United States Air Force
