= RAF Wormingford =

Former Royal Air Force station in Essex, England

RAF Wormingford RFC Wormingford USAAF Station 159
- Near Colchester, Essex in England
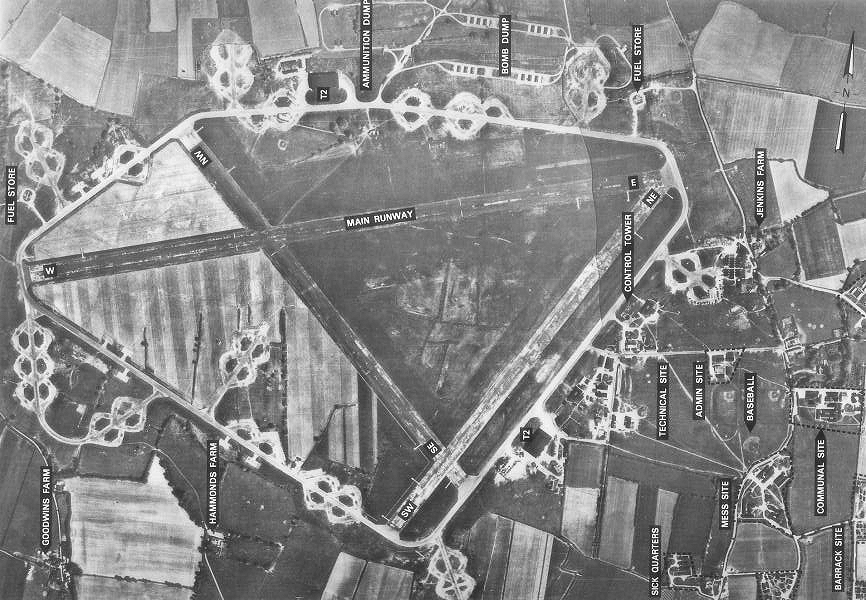
- Wormingford Airfield - 10 May 1946

Site information
- Type: Royal Air Force station
- Code: WO
- Owner: Ministry of Defence
- Operator: Royal Flying Corps; United States Army Air Forces; Royal Air Force
- Controlled by: Ninth Air Force; Eighth Air Force

Location
- Shown within Essex RAF Wormingford (the United Kingdom)
- Coordinates: 51.940°N 0.792°E

Site history
- Built: 1917, 1942
- Built by: Richard Costain Ltd
- In use: 1917-1920, 1943-1962
- Battles/wars: European Theatre of World War II; Air Offensive, Europe July 1942 - May 1945

Airfield information
Runways
| Direction | Length and surface |
|---|---|
| 00/00 |
| 00/00 |
| 00/00 |

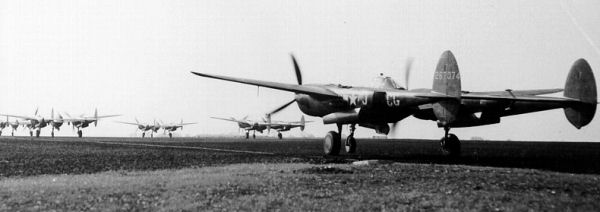
Lockheed P-38H-5-LO Lightnings of the 38th Fighter Squadron. Serial 42-67074 is to the right.

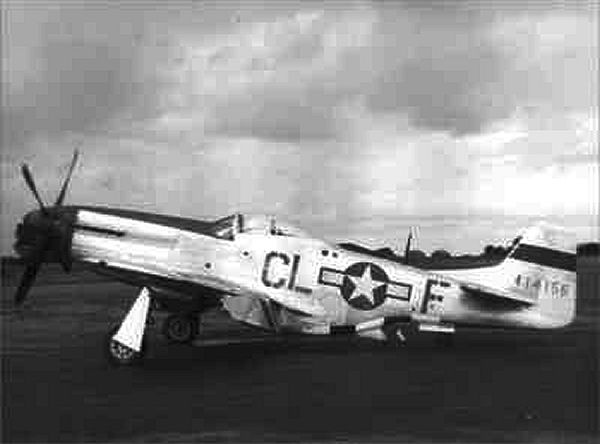
North American P-51D-10-NA Mustang Serial 44-14156 of the 338th Fighter Squadron.

Royal Air Force Wormingford or more simply RAF Wormingford is a former Royal Air Force station located 6 miles (10 km) northwest of Colchester, Essex, England.

During the First World War Wormingford was a landing ground designated for use by aircraft operating against Zeppelins. Reopened as a military airfield in 1942 during the Second World War, it was used by both the Royal Air Force (RAF) and the United States Army Air Forces (USAAF). During the war it was used primarily as a fighter airfield. After the war, it was returned to agriculture.

The main runway was used by the Essex and Suffolk Gliding Club until September 2026, although the concrete had been removed except where the old NW-SE runway crosses.

== History ==
=== First World War ===
The landing ground was used by the 37th Home Defence Squadron and a Royal Aircraft Factory B.E.12 based here shot down Zeppelin number L.48 on 16/17 June 1917. The landing ground was known as RFC Wormingford.

=== Second World War ===
Wormingford was originally earmarked for an Eighth Heavy Bomb Group, being built by Richard Costain Ltd. and helped by a number of sub-contractors during the period 1942/1943. The airfield had a 2,000-yard main runway on an E-W axis and two intersecting runways of 1,400 yards each along with the USAAF standard fifty hardstands, two T2 hangars, one each side of the airfield, Mark II lighting and temporary building accommodation for 2,900 personnel. The technical area was on the southern side of the airfield and the camp sites dispersed to the south and east in and around the village of Fordham.

However, Wormingford was surplus to Eighth Air Force requirements as a heavy bomber airfield and it was used instead as a fighter airfield although initially the Ninth Air Force used the airfield.

==== USAAF use ====
The airfield was assigned USAAF designation Station 159.

===== 362nd Fighter Group =====
The 362nd Fighter Group (362nd FG) arrived at Wormingford from Mitchel Field, New York as part of the Ninth Air Force on 30 November 1943 with Republic P-47 Thunderbolts.

The group consisted of the following squadrons:

- 377th Fighter Squadron (E4)
- 378th Fighter Squadron (G8)
- 379th Fighter Squadron (B8)

The 362nd FG flew its first mission, escorting Consolidated B-24 Liberators that attacked V-weapon launching sites near the Pas de Calais on 8 February 1944. Until April 1944 the group engaged chiefly in escorting Boeing B-17 Flying Fortress/B-24 bombers that struck factories, railways, airfields, and other targets on the Continent. The group repeatedly attacked communications in northern France and in Belgium during Apr and May, in preparation for the invasion of Normandy.

The group moved to RAF Headcorn in Kent on 13 April 1944.

===== 55th Fighter Group =====
The 55th Fighter Group moved to Wormingford on 16 April 1944. The 55th was under the command of the 66th Fighter Wing of the VIII Fighter Command. Aircraft of the 55th were identified by a green/yellow chequerboard pattern around their cowling.

The group consisted of the following squadrons:

- 38th Fighter Squadron (CG)
- 338th Fighter Squadron (CL)
- 343d Fighter Squadron (CY)

Originally flying Lockheed P-38 Lightnings, then converting to North American P-51 Mustangs in July the group attacked gun emplacements during the Saint-Lô breakthrough in July 1944, and transportation facilities during the Battle of the Bulge, December 1944-January 1945. The group also patrolled the air over the English Channel and bombed bridges in the Tours area during the invasion of the Continent in June 1944. The unit patrolled the Arnhem sector to support the airborne invasion of the Netherlands in September 1944 along with strafing trucks, locomotives, and oil depots near Wesel when the Allies crossed the Rhine in March 1945.

The unit received a Distinguished Unit Citation (DUC) for eight missions to Germany between 3 and 13 September 1944 when the group not only destroyed enemy fighters in the air to protect the bombers it was escorting, but also descended to low levels, in spite of intense anti-aircraft fire, to strafe airfields and to destroy enemy aircraft on the ground. They received a second DUC for operations on 19 February 1945 when the organisation flew a sweep over Germany to hit railway tracks, locomotives, oil cars, goods wagons, troop cars, buildings, and military vehicles. The 55th flew their last combat mission on 21 April 1945.

The 55th Fighter Group moved to Kaufbeuren, Germany on 22 July 1945 as part of the occupation forces. It was assigned to United States Air Forces in Europe. While on occupation duty, the group trained with P-51 and Lockheed P-80 Shooting Star aircraft. Inactivated in Germany on 20 August 1946.

Legacy

The United States Air Force 55th Wing in various designations, has been a front-line unit of Strategic Air Command and Air Combat Command more than 50 years.

The 55th Reconnaissance Group (Very Long Range, Mapping). was activated in 1948 and assigned to Strategic Air Command. Aircraft included RB-17's and Boeing B-29 Superfortresses and RB-29's. The USAF 55th Strategic Reconnaissance Wing was activated in 1950, and was bestowed the lineage, honors and history of the World War II USAAF 55th Fighter Group in 1952.

The 55th Wing is currently at Offut AFB, Nebraska.

===== 3d Scouting Force =====
In September 1944, the 3d Scouting Force (originally 3rd Air Division Scouting Force) was activated at Wormingford. The unit flew a combination of P-47s, P-51s and B-17s on classified missions such as scouting target visibility and reporting meteorological conditions. The unit was inactivated during June 1945.

==== Royal Air Force use ====
After V-E Day Wormingford was turned over to RAF Technical Training Command and later to RAF Transport Command. Later it was transferred to other government departments until being sold off between 1960 and 1962.

The following units were also here at some point:

- No. 75 Squadron RAF
- No. 94 Staging Post
- No. 160 Staging Post
- No. 163 Staging Post

== Current use ==
With the end of military control, Wormingford was largely returned to agriculture and much of the concrete broken up for aggregate. A small section of the main runway was retained and the whole of the main runway, largely grass, was used by the Essex and Suffolk Gliding Club. In September 2026 the lease on the club’s historic airfield expired with the club currently pursuing a new location in Suffolk. The majority of the grass runway will be returned to agriculture in line with the rest of the site.

== See also ==
- List of former Royal Air Force stations
