= Lignerolles Airfield =

Abandoned WWII military airfield in northern France

Lignerolles Airfield Advanced Landing Ground (ALG) A-12
- Basse-Normandie Region, France
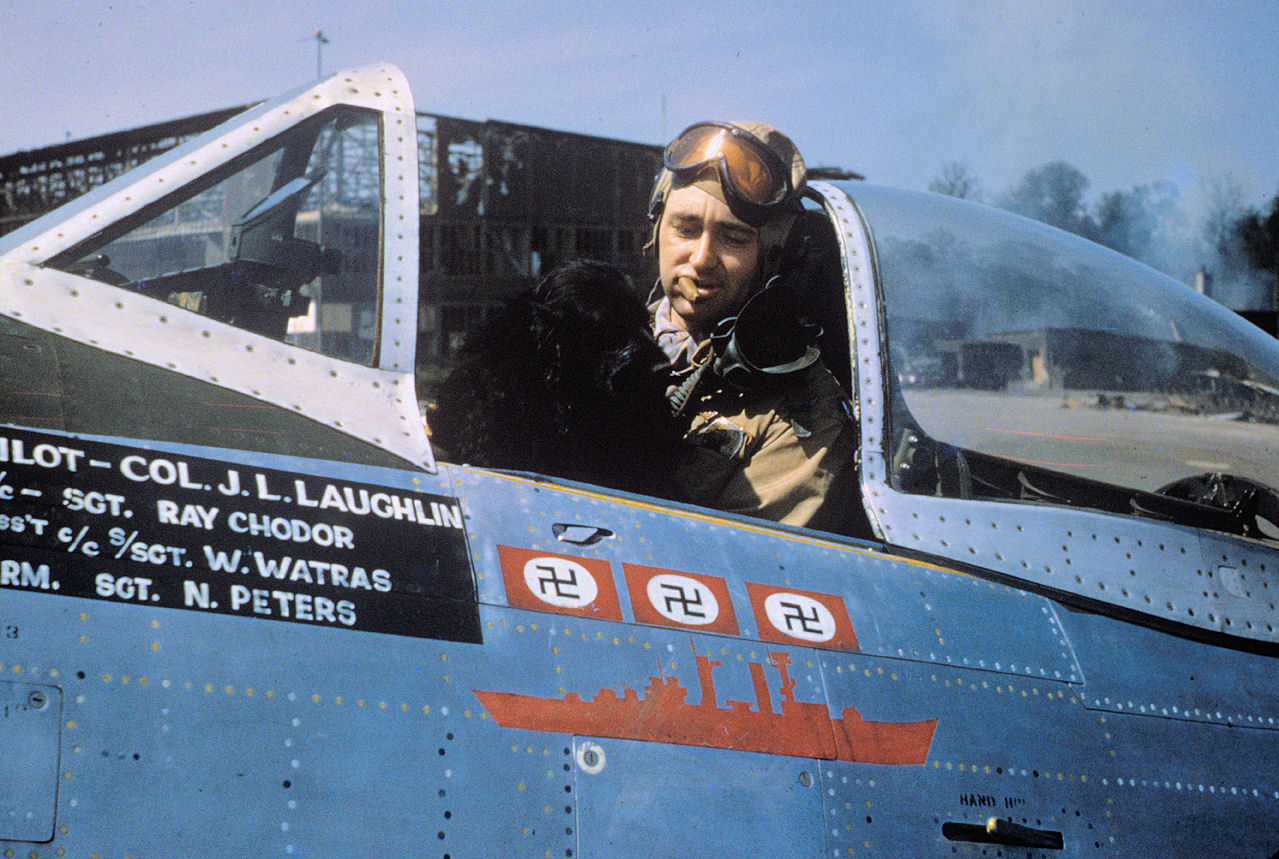
- Colonel J.L. Laughlin, of the 362nd Fighter Group, smokes a cigar with his dog mascot "Prince" inside the cockpit of his P-47D serial 44-33287 "Five By Five" (coded B8-A)

Site information
- Type: Military Airfield
- Controlled by: United States Army Air Forces

Location
- Coordinates: 49°10′32″N 000°47′24″W

Site history
- Built by: IX Engineering Command
- In use: July–November 1944
- Materials: Prefabricated Hessian Surfacing (PHS)
- Battles/wars: World War II – EAME Theater: Northern France Campaign

Garrison information
- Garrison: Ninth Air Force
- Occupants: 362d Fighter Group; 365th Fighter Group

Airfield information
Runways
Direction	Length and surface
07/25	5,000 feet (1,520 m) SMT/PSP
- One runway, 4 alert pads, 50 hardstands

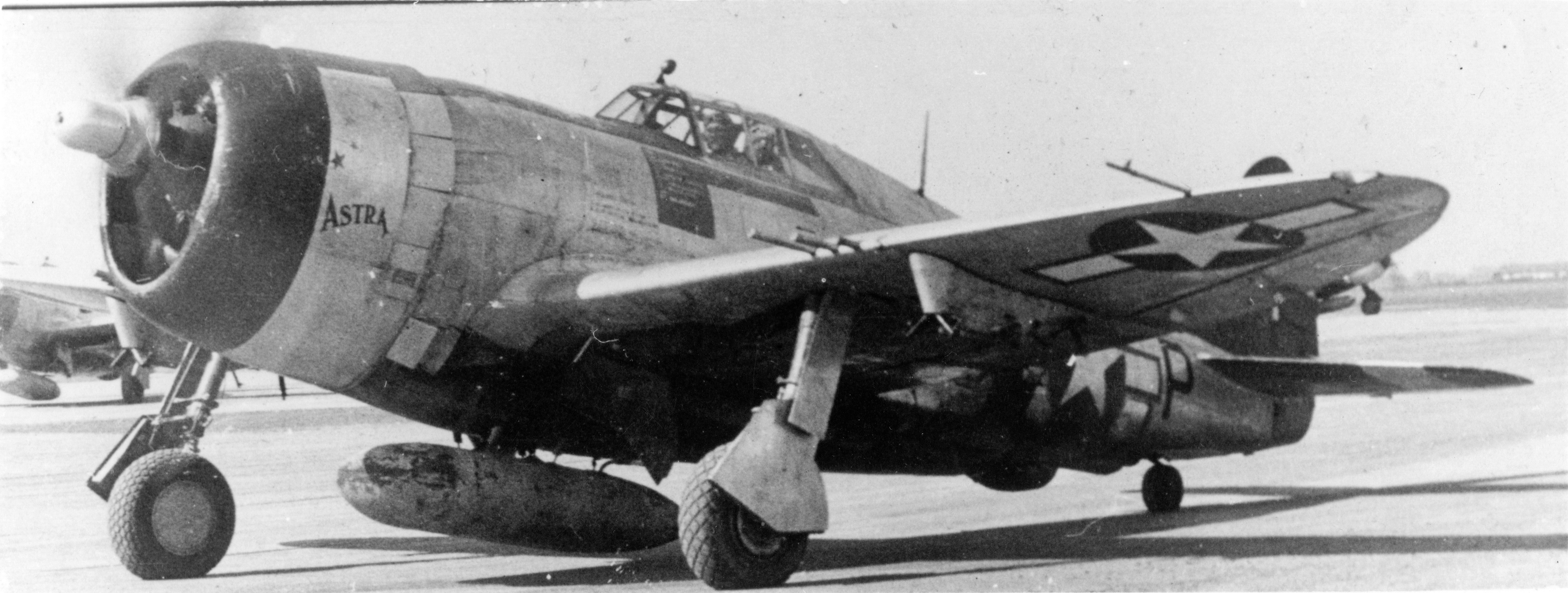
A two-seat P-47 Thunderbolt nicknamed "Astra" of the 365th Fighter Group.

Lignerolles Airfield is an abandoned World War II military airfield near the commune of Lignerolles in the Normandy region of northern France.

Located to the south and east of Lignerolles, the United States Army Air Force established a temporary airfield on 6 July 1944, shortly after the Allied landings in France. The airfield was constructed by the IX Engineering Command, 820th Engineer Aviation Battalion.

== History ==
Known as Advanced Landing Ground "A-12", the airfield consisted of a single Prefabricated Hessian Surfacing runway. In addition, tents were used for billeting and also for support facilities; an access road was built to the existing road infrastructure; a dump for supplies, ammunition, and gasoline drums, along with a drinkable water and minimal electrical grid for communications and station lighting.

The fighter planes from Lignerolles flew support missions during the Allied invasion of Normandy, patrolling roads in front of the beachhead; strafing German military vehicles and dropping bombs on gun emplacements, anti-aircraft artillery and concentrations of German troops in Normandy and Brittany when spotted.

In the beginning of September 1944, 34 Wing (RAF) was moved from RAF Northolt to Lignerolles. The wing operated two photographic reconnaissance squadrons from the airfield in support of the Canadian Army.

After the Americans and British moved east into Central France with the advancing Allied Armies, the airfield was left un-garrisoned and used for resupply and casualty evacuation. It was closed on 4 November 1944 and the land returned to agricultural use.

== Major units assigned ==
- 362d Fighter Group 2 July – 10 August 1944

377th (E4), 378th (G8), 379th (B6) Fighter Squadrons (P-47)

- 365th Fighter Group 15 August – 3 September 1944

386th (D5), 387th (B4), 388th (C4) Fighter Squadrons (P-47D)

- 34 Wing (Royal Air Force), September 1944

69 Squadron (MJ) (Spitfires XI), 140 Squadron (ZW) (Mosquito XVI)

== Current use ==
Today there is little or no physical evidence of the airfield's existence. A memorial to the men and units that were stationed at Lignerolles was placed at the site of the former airfield. It is located along a path that starts from the D13 at the place called The Hodam.

== See also ==
- Advanced Landing Ground
