= Verdun-Le-Rozelier Airport =

- IATA: XVN; ICAO: LFGW

Summary
- Location: Verdun, France
- Elevation AMSL: 1,230 ft / 375 m
- Coordinates: 49°07′20.48″N 005°28′08.57″E

Map
- Location of Verdun-Le-Rozelier Airport

Runways
Direction	Length		Surface
Direction	ft	m	Surface
10/28	3,775	1,120	Asphalt

Verdun-Le-Rozelier Airport (IATA: XVN, ICAO: LFGW) is a regional airport in France, located 5 miles (8.0 km) southeast of Verdun (Departement de la Meuse, Lorraine), 139 miles (224 km) east-northeast of Paris.

It supports general aviation with no commercial airline service scheduled.

== History ==
Le-Rozelier Airport is a modern, well-equipped general aviation airport. On the south side of the runway appears to be the remains of a wartime taxiway, along with concrete footers of long-dismantled wartime buildings, probably aircraft shelters. On the north side appears to be the remains of a wartime parking ramp and part of a taxiway.
