= Illesheim Army Heliport =

Military airfield in Germany

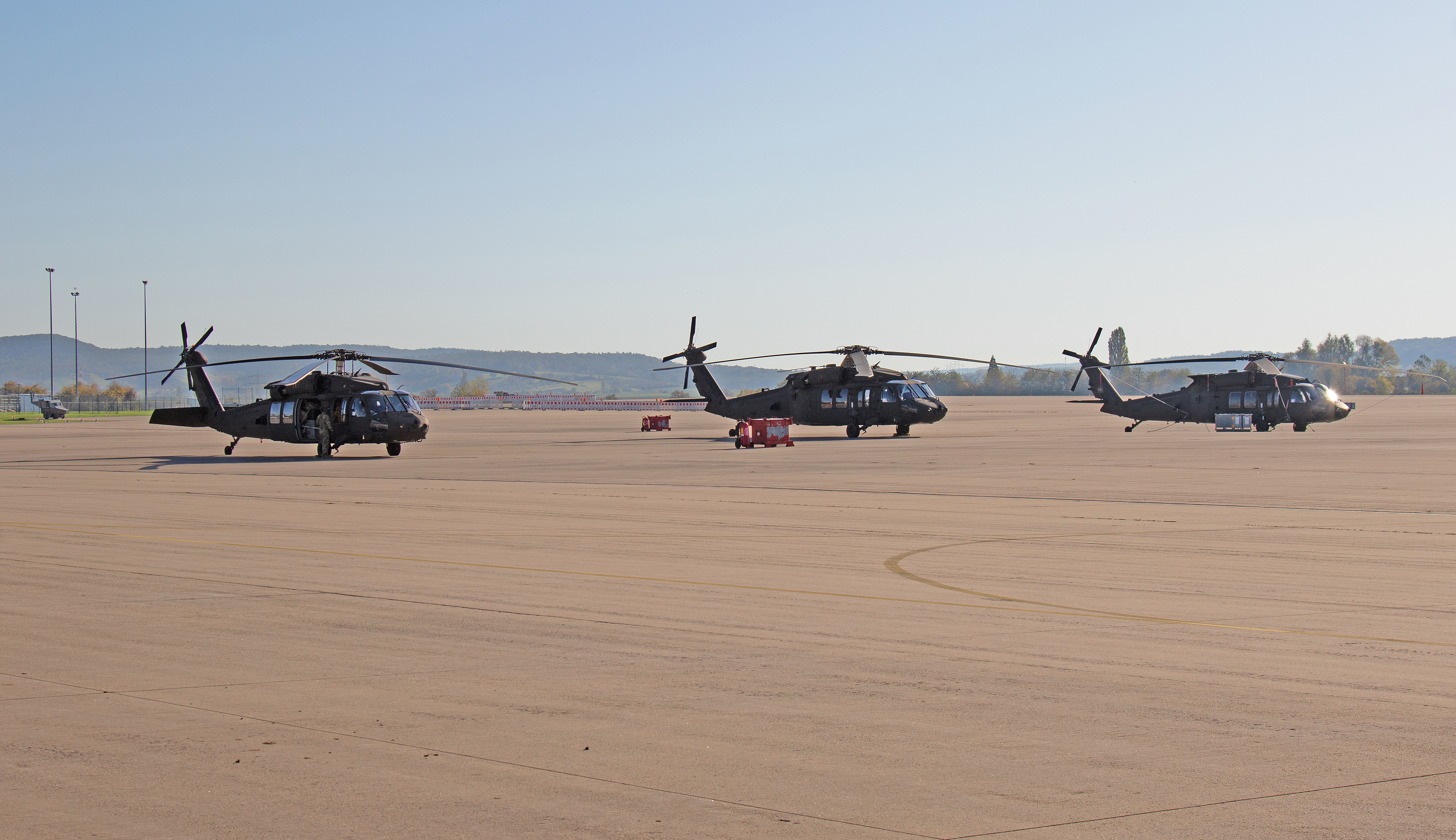
- UH-60 Blackhawks on the ramp at Illesheim AHP in 2019
- IATA: ILH; ICAO: ETIK

Summary
- Airport type: Military
- Operator: United States Army
- Elevation AMSL: 1,078 ft / 329 m
- Coordinates: 49°28.43′N 10°23.27′E

Map
- Location in Germany

Runways
Direction	Length		Surface
Direction	ft	m	Surface
06/24	2,800	853	Asphalt
- Source: DoD FLIP

Illesheim Army Heliport (IATA: ILH, ICAO: ETIK) is a military heliport in Illesheim, a small municipality in Bavaria, Germany. The airfield is part of the Storck Barracks and serves as a base for a rotating contingent of U.S. Army Aviation forces in support of Operation Atlantic Resolve.
