= Boeing OC-135B Open Skies =

US Air Force observation aircraft

OC-135 Open Skies
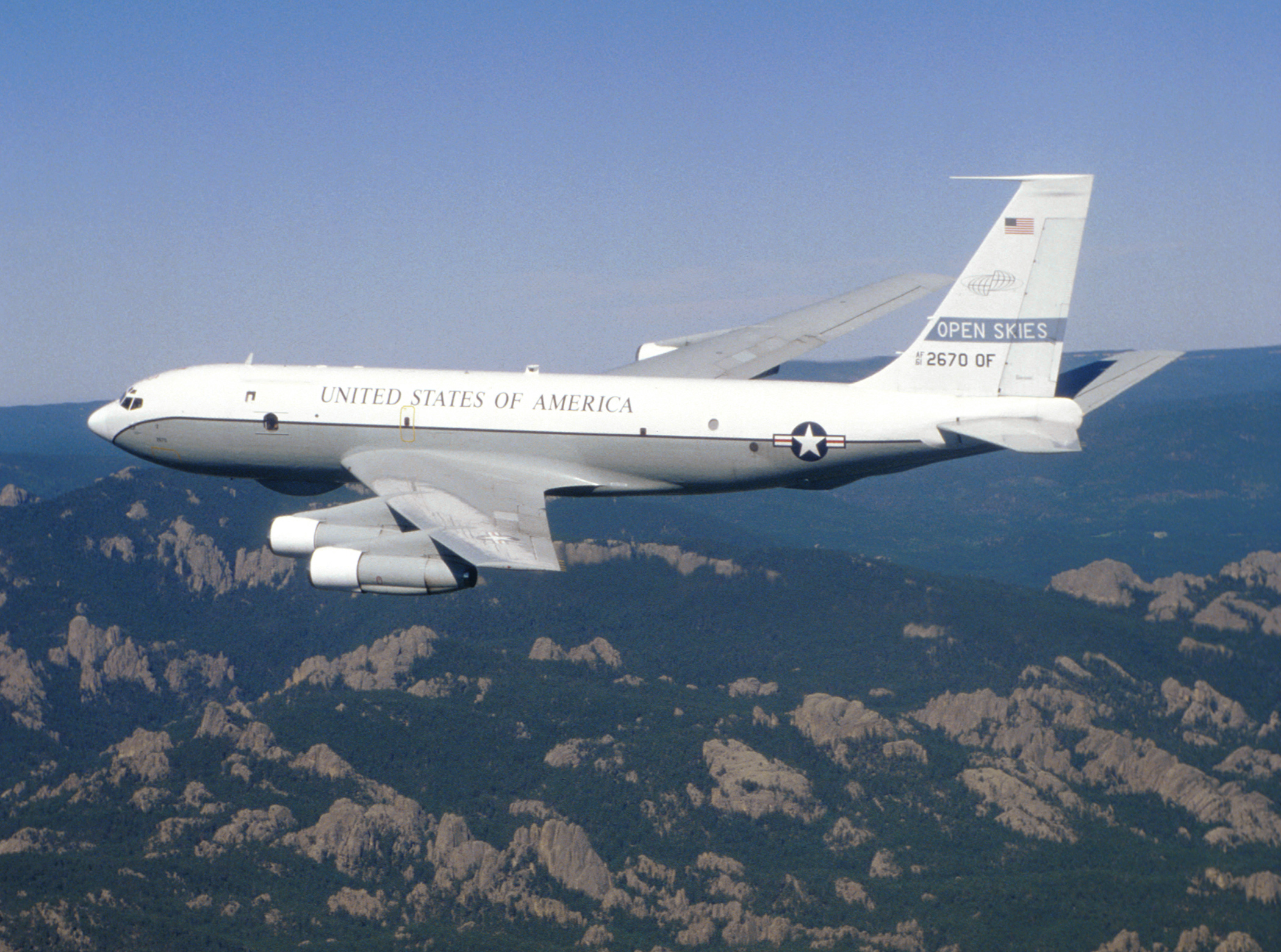

General information
- Type: Observation Support/Support Open Skies Treaty
- Manufacturer: Boeing Defense, Space & Security
- Status: Retired
- Primary user: United States Air Force (intended)
- Number built: 3

History
- Introduction date: June 1993
- Developed from: Boeing WC-135 Constant Phoenix

The OC-135B Open Skies is a United States Air Force observation aircraft that supported the Treaty on Open Skies. The aircraft, a modified WC-135B, flew unarmed observation flights over participating parties of the treaty. Three OC-135B aircraft were modified by the Aeronautical Systems Center's 4950th Test Wing at Wright-Patterson Air Force Base in Ohio but only two were ever used. The first operationally-capable OC-135B was assigned to the 24th Reconnaissance Squadron at Offutt AFB in October 1993. They were later fitted with a basic set of navigational and sensor equipment, and was placed in inviolate storage at the Aerospace Maintenance and Regeneration Center at Davis-Monthan Air Force Base near Tucson, Arizona in 1997. Two fully operational OC-135B aircraft were delivered in 1996 with the full complement of treaty-allowed sensors, which includes an infrared line scanner, synthetic aperture radar and video scanning sensors.

In May 2020, the Trump administration said it would exit the treaty and gave the required six-month notice. In November, it announced plans to liquidate the two 60-year-old jets, offering them to other countries.

== Description of aircraft ==
The interior seats 35 people, including the cockpit crew, aircraft maintenance crew, with bunks for the Crew Chiefs to sleep, foreign country representatives and crew members from the U.S. Department of Defense's Defense Threat Reduction Agency (DTRA). Cameras installed include one vertical and two oblique KS-87E framing cameras used for low-altitude photography approximately 3,000 feet (900 m) above the ground, and one KA-91C panoramic camera, which scans from side to side to provide a wide sweep for each picture used for high-altitude photography at approximately 35,000 feet (11,000 m).

The data annotation and recording system (DARMS) processes navigational, altitude, time and camera signals to annotate each picture with correct position, altitude, time, roll angle and other information. In addition, this system records every picture taken according to camera, frame and navigational position. A keyboard with trackball is the input device for operation of this system. Two Barco 12-inch (30 cm) VGA color monitors display camera annotation and other camera data on screen for the sensor operator and observer use.

Camera control, located in the sensor operator's console, operates and adjusts individual cameras for cloud cover, frame overlap and other functions. The sensor operator console seats four and has all the equipment listed above plus camera bay heating control, chronometers, emergency oxygen, interphone and individual lighting. The flight following console also seats four and includes most of the equipment listed above except for DARMS and camera controls.

Seven commercial Norcold Tek II coolers with individual refrigeration units maintain temperature and humidity control to maintain peak film performance. The units can be removed, if necessary, from the aircraft in order to transport film. The coolers are capable of storing 40,000 feet (12,000 m) of film or lots of food and drinks when in country.

== Flight path ==
The aircraft flies on its intended flight path throughout the entire mission with no reliance on ground-based navigation devices. A top-of-the-line commercial system, Litton 92 INS/GPS, which is an integrated inertial navigation system (INS) with a global positioning system (GPS), provides continuous updates. The GPS updates the INS several times per second to correct any deviations in the flight path. The INS also feeds precise latitude, longitude, time, roll angle and barometric altitude to the DARMS and camera systems. A true airspeed computer feeds true airspeed data to the INS.

A combined altitude radar altimeter provides precise height above ground information to the pilot for navigational purposes as well as a signal to DARMS for film annotation. It is accurate from 0–50,000 feet (0–15,000 m) above the ground level. Plus, a metric altimeter is installed on the pilot's instrument panel for altitude reference when flying in countries that use meters for altitude reference.

The aircraft are being upgraded with the Block 30 Pacer Crag Navigational System upgrade, a first step in making them compliant with ICAO mandated Global Air Traffic Management and Global Air Navigation Standards guidelines.

== Modifications ==
The OC-135B modifications center around four cameras installed in the rear of the aircraft. Since its primary mission is to take pictures, most of the installed equipment and systems provide direct support to the cameras and the camera operator. Other modifications to the aircraft also included installing an auxiliary power unit, crew luggage compartment, sensor operator console, flight following console and upgraded avionics. Though the aircraft feature a large window in the cargo door, this is simply a remnant of their previous weather reconnaissance role.

Other modifications support the aircrew. A gaseous oxygen system replaced the liquid oxygen system to be more compatible with foreign airfields, and fluorescent lighting system was added throughout the cabin to provide adequate lighting for operation and inspections. Four upgraded seats with a conference table, interphone, lighting and oxygen comprise the mission commanders' station for both countries' mission commanders. A four channel interphone system enables segregated communications between various elements on board. The auxiliary power unit enables the aircraft to start engines and provides electrical power and cabin heat independent of ground support equipment. It was manufactured by Allied Signal with the installation and design of the installation by E-Systems and World Auxiliary Power Company.

Until 2022 the aircraft were assigned to Air Combat Command at the 55th Wing, 45th Reconnaissance Squadron, Offutt Air Force Base near Omaha, Nebraska, for operations, training and maintenance. These aircraft are now located in the boneyard at Davis-Monthan Air Force Base and are being decommissioned. When tasked, ACC's role was to transport a DTRA observation team to an Open Skies point of entry airport, conduct the observation flight, and then return the team to the continental United States.

== Specifications (OC-135) ==
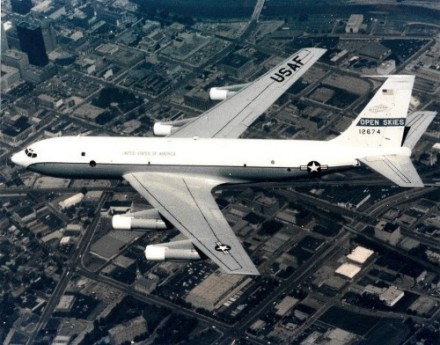

Data from Jane's all the World's Aircraft 1994–95 (crew and operational equipment), AF Fact Sheet : OC-135B OPEN SKIES

General characteristics

- Crew: Seven (three pilots, two navigators, and two sensor maintenance technicians)
- Capacity: 31 mission crew, including DTRA mission flight crew: mission commander, deputy mission commander, two sensor operators and one flight follower
- Length: 136 ft 3 in (41.53 m)
- Wingspan: 130 ft 10 in (39.88 m)
- Height: 41 ft 8 in (12.70 m)
- Wing area: 2,433 sq ft (226.0 m^{2})
- Airfoil: root: BAC 310/311/312; tip: BAC 313
- Empty weight: 98,466 lb (44,663 kg)
- Empty equipped weight: 124,000 lb (56,000 kg)
- Gross weight: 297,000 lb (134,717 kg)
- Max takeoff weight: 322,500 lb (146,284 kg)
- Powerplant: 4 × Pratt and Whitney TF33-P-5 turbofan engines, 18,000 lbf (80 kN) thrust each

Performance

- Maximum speed: 504 kn (580 mph, 933 km/h)
- Range: 2,998 nmi (3,450 mi, 5,552 km)
- Service ceiling: 50,000 ft (15,000 m)
- Rate of climb: 4,900 ft/min (25 m/s)

Avionics

- 3x Boeing KS-87B cameras
- 1x Recon/Optical KA-91B panoramic camera
- Loral AN/UPD-8 Synthetic aperture radar
- Improved navigation and communications equipment

== See also ==
Related development

- Boeing C-135 Stratolifter
- Boeing KC-135 Stratotanker
- Boeing WC-135 Constant Phoenix
- Boeing RC-135

Related lists

- List of active United States military aircraft
