= Rivet joint =

Rivet joint may refer to

- a joint of two or more components using rivets
- the RC-135V/W Rivet Joint, a reconnaissance aeroplane built by Boeing
