= 24th Reconnaissance Squadron (disambiguation) =

24th Reconnaissance Squadron may refer to:

- The 24th Expeditionary Reconnaissance Squadron, designated the 24th Reconnaissance Squadron from July 1992 to June 1994
- The 414th Expeditionary Reconnaissance Squadron, designated the 24th Reconnaissance Squadron (Heavy) from February 1942 to April 1942.
- The 24th Tactical Air Support Squadron, designated the 24th Reconnaissance Squadron, Very Long Range (Photographic - Radar Countermeasures) from July 1947 to June 1949
- The 24th Intelligence Squadron, designated the 24th Reconnaissance Squadron (Bombardment) from April 1943 to August 1943.

== See also ==
- The 24th Strategic Reconnaissance Squadron, Medium, active from January 1951 to June 1952
- The 24th Strategic Reconnaissance Squadron, active from March 1967 to July 1992
