= 45th Reconnaissance Squadron =

Unit of the United States Air Force

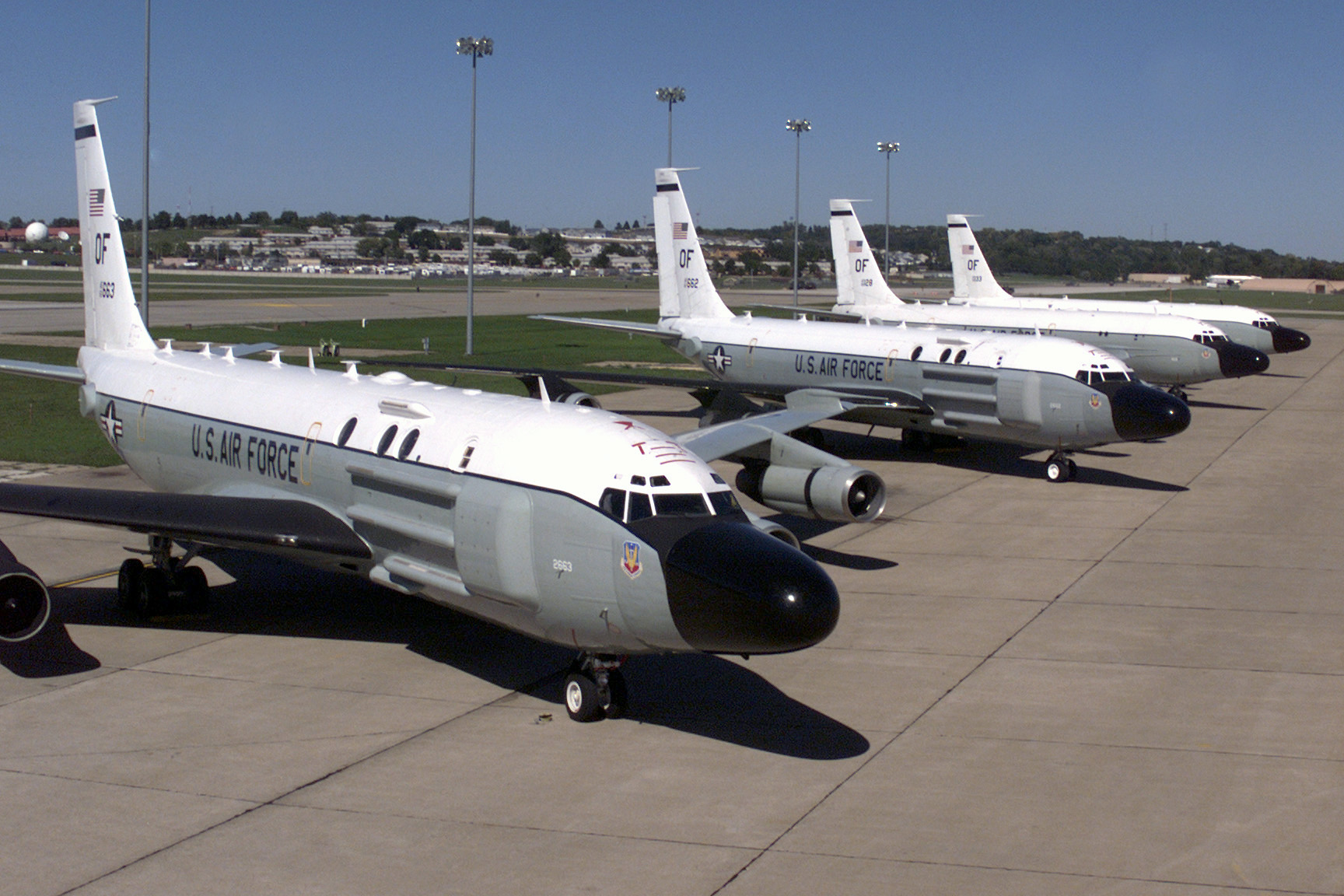
- 45th Reconnaissance Squadron's RC-135 Cobra Ball together on the flightline at Offutt Air Force Base, Nebraska. (Note: These aircraft are rarely seen in the same place at the same time due to the squadron's worldwide reconnaissance missions.)
- Active: 1943–1949; 1950–1971; 1971–1975; 1982–1989; 1994 – present
- Country: United States
- Branch: United States Air Force
- Type: Squadron
- Role: Reconnaissance and Surveillance
- Part of: Air Combat Command
- Garrison/HQ: Offutt Air Force Base, Nebraska
- Engagements: World War II EAME Theatre; Korean War; Vietnam War

- Decorations: Distinguished Unit Citation (Korea) (3x); Presidential Unit Citation (Vietnam) (3x); Air Force Outstanding Unit Award (4x); Air Force Outstanding Unit Award with Combat "V" Device (5x); Air Force Meritorious Unit Award (6x); Air Force Outstanding Unit Award (10x); Republic of Korea Presidential Unit Citation; Republic of Vietnam Gallantry Cross with Palm

Insignia
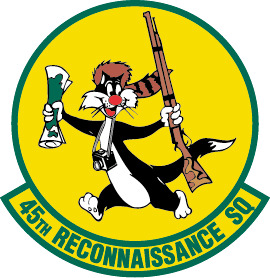
- 45th Reconnaissance Squadron emblem (Note: Approved 29 December 1952. DescriptionL: Superimpposed on a grass green edged sunshine yellow disk, a black and white characterized cat (the Warner Brothers Cartoons, Inc. "Sylvester the Cat") nose and tongue are colored crimson. This character is wearing a chocolate-colored coonskin cap with darker brown bandings and shading, with the tail of the cap flowing to the character's left. Suspended about the cat's neck is a box-type canera, dark grey and black in color. In the right hand, extended outward at shoulder level, a roll of green and white maps. The left hand is in a similar posigtion and is holding a "Kentucky" rifle colored in shades of brown and black. The cat is in a running position with the right foot forward.)

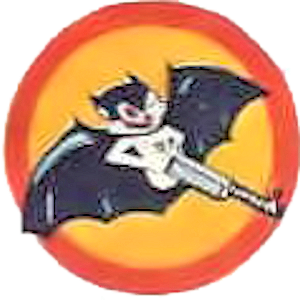
- 423d Night Fighter Squadron emblem

The 45th Reconnaissance Squadron is a United States Air Force unit. It is assigned to the 55th Operations Group and stationed at Offutt Air Force Base, Nebraska. It is one of the most decorated squadrons of the active duty United States Air Force with a combat record in three wars, and a peacetime record of vital contributions to worldwide reconnaissance, treaty monitoring, and pilot proficiency training.

The unit was formed during World War II initially as a night interceptor squadron and deployed to England as part of Ninth Air Force. A lack of night interceptor aircraft led the squadron to be converted into a night photographic squadron engaging in combat missions over France, the Low Countries and Germany until the end of the war. It later saw service as a tactical reconnaissance squadron during the Korean War and Vietnam War. It was inactivated in 1994 as part of the cutbacks in the Air Force after the end of the Cold War.

Reactivated shortly afterwards, it assumed the mission of the former 24th Reconnaissance Squadron, which it replaced. Squadron personnel fly worldwide reconnaissance and treaty missions on demand, often on extremely short notice. The 45th Reconnaissance Squadron provides data for the National Command Authority, theater commanders, and international treaty members.

== Overview ==
Squadron personnel fly worldwide reconnaissance and treaty missions on demand, often on extremely short notice. The 45th Reconnaissance Squadron provides data for the National Command Authority, theater commanders, and international treaty members.

== History ==
=== World War II ===
The squadron was constituted on 17 August 1943 as the 423d Night Fighter Squadron at Orlando Army Air Base, Florida, however it wasn't organized until 1 October. The 423d was the second squadron of the third group of dedicated night fighter squadrons trained by the Army Air Forces. It initially trained with the Douglas P-70 Havoc night fighter at Orlando, although later that fall the squadron began to train with the Northrop YP-61 Black Widow. (Note: Neither Maurer nor Robertson indicate the squadron ever flew the P-61. Robertson, Maurer, Combat Squadrons pp. 355–356.) In January, training was interrupted when the night fighter school moved from Florida to Hammer Field, California. After the relocation, the squadron completed its training in March 1944.

The 423d deployed to England and was assigned to IX Tactical Air Command at RAF Charmy Down. Charmy Down eventually would become the home of three night fighter squadrons (422d, 423d, and 424th), however the squadron arrived unequipped as the P-61 Black Widows were late in arriving. Subsequently, the squadron had its aircrews posted to various RAF night fighter and signal schools for theater indoctrination. Meanwhile, as there was no sign of the P-61s. the pilots kept up their flight time on Cessna UC-78s and de Havilland Mosquitoes.

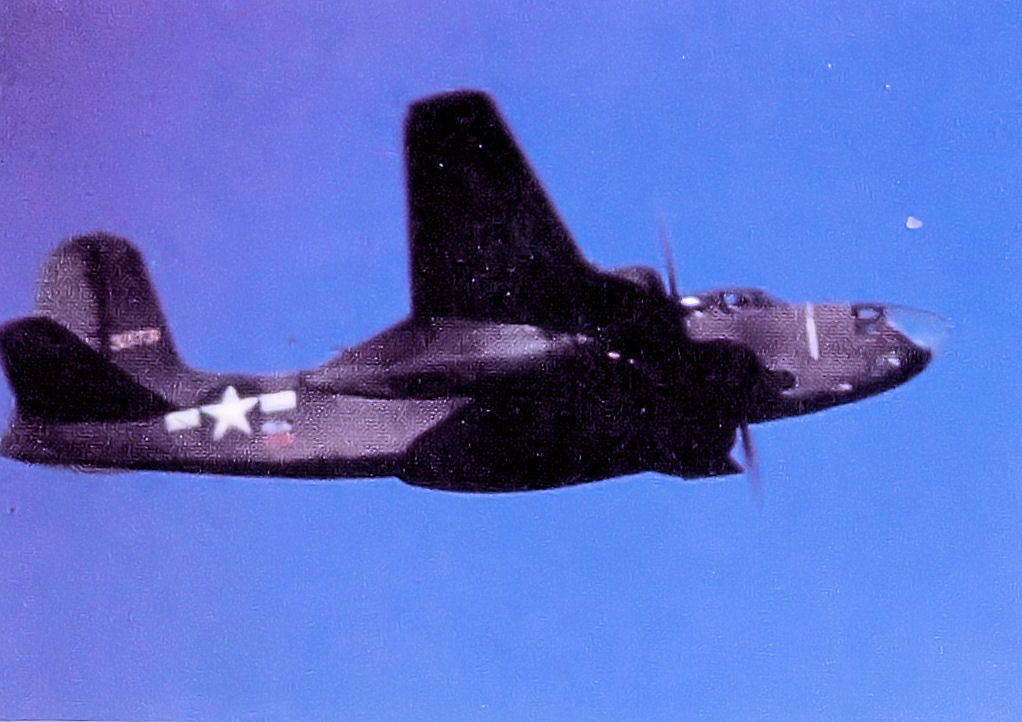
155th Photo Reconnaissance Squadron A-20 Havoc (Note: Aircraft is Douglas A-20J-15-DO Havoc (converted to F-3A) serial 43-21731 at St Dizier/Robinson Airdrome (A-64), France, October 1944.)

Finally, when the P-61s began to arrive in mid-May from California, there were insufficient aircraft to equip all three squadrons. The 423d was redesignated as the 155th Photographic Reconnaissance Squadron and moved to RAF Chalgrove. There, the squadron was equipped with some Douglas F-3 Havoc twin-engine reconnaissance aircraft. The night flying skills of the pilots trained for interceptor work was put to good use, being transitioned into night reconnaissance pilots. Finally, in early August, the squadron moved to France and became an independent unit under the 64th Fighter Wing. The squadron carried photo-flash bombs, illuminating various roads, bridges, railroads and other enemy targets. The photos would then be analyzed at the squadron's base and based on the intelligence gathered by the squadron, interdiction strikes would be carried out.

The squadron moved across France and then into the Low Countries as the Allies advanced. In December 1944, the 155th was involved in the Battle of the Bulge. The squadron moved to Germany as part of the occupation forces i July 1945, first at AAF Station Kassel/Rothwesten, then at AAF Station Darmstadt/Griesheim, AAF Station Fürth, and at Fürstenfeldbruck Air Base. After the war with the reformation of the Air National Guard in the United States, the unit's designation was changed to the 45th Tactical Reconnaissance Squadron, Night Photographic, as units in the 101–299 range were assigned to the new Air National Guard units.

President Truman's reduced 1949 defense budget also required reductions in the number of units in the Air Force. As a result, the squadron was inactivated on 25 March 1949 in West Germany.

=== Korean War ===
The squadron was redesignated the 45th Tactical Reconnaissance Squadron and activated on 26 September 1950 at Itazuke Air Base, Japan, where it was assigned to the 543d Tactical Support Group. When the Korean War erupted in late June 1950, the USAF's standard fighter in the Far East was the Lockheed F-80 Shooting Star, however the F-80 and its reconnaissance version, the RF-80, were very short-legged. It was decided to equip the squadron with propeller-driven North American RF-51 Mustangs. However, the squadron did not receive its first RF-51 until November and it was December before it began delivering visual reconnaissance results. Even though the Mustangs would be jet-bait for any North Korean MiG-15 jet fighters, it could be safely employed over South Korea, while the jet-equipped squadrons would engage Communist jets that only flew in North Korean airspace.

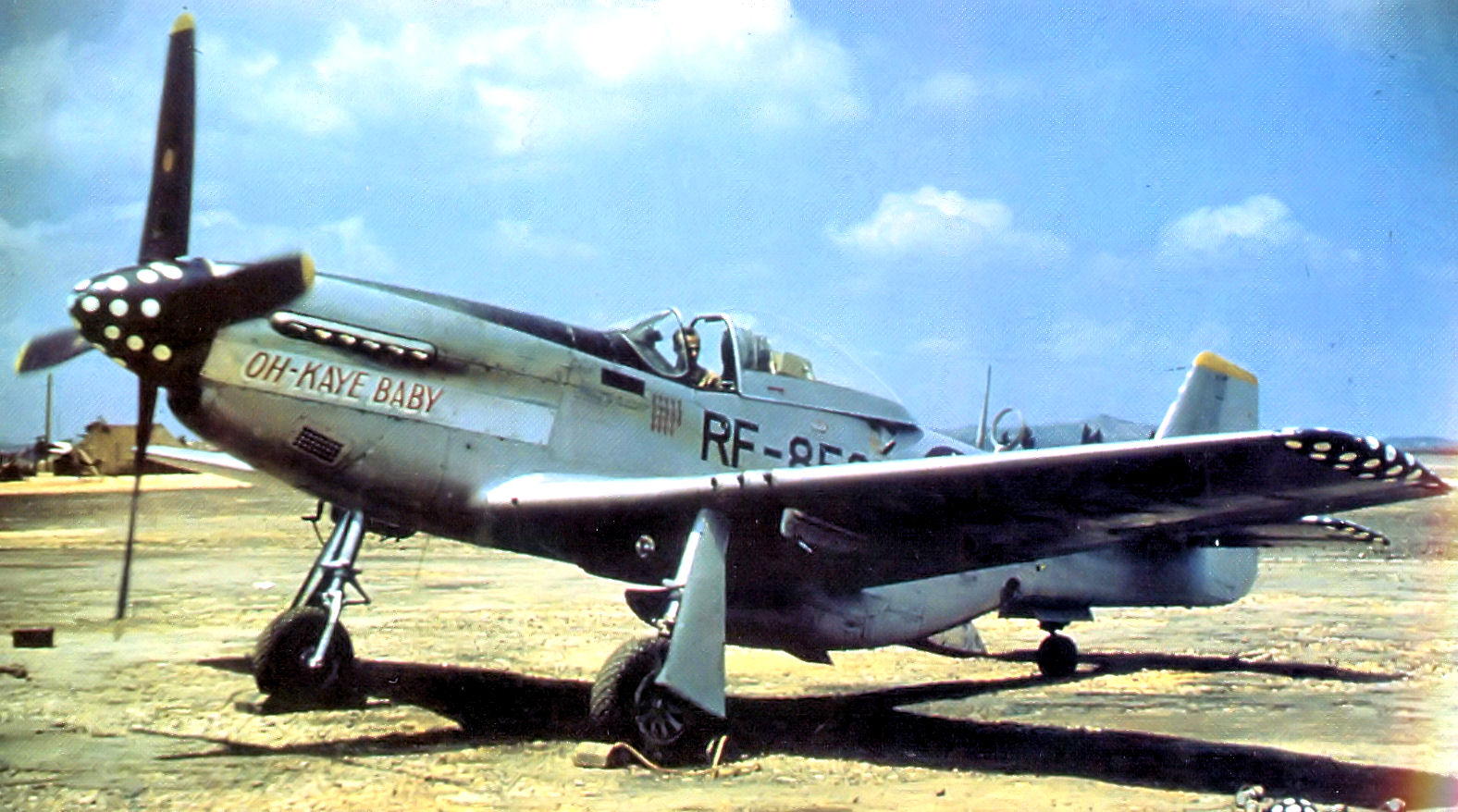
45th TRS RF-51 Mustang, South Korea, 1950

Six month after the Korean War began, on 27 December 1950, the squadron deployed to Taegu Air Base (K-9), South Korea, and served in every major campaign throughout the war. Accurate battlefield intelligence was a top priority, and the 45th was assigned directly to the 314th Air Division, which was the main USAF command and control headquarters in theater. The squadron maintained patrols with its RF-51s 15 to 20 miles in front of each of Eighth Army's corps, reporting their sightings directly to the corps fire support coordination centers. As enemy air defenses improved,flak proved a particular hazard to the squadron's Mustangs, which generally operated below 4,000 feet above ground level. After losing 5 RF-51s to enemy ground fire, the squadron restricted its planes from flying lower than 6,000 feet above the ground and began flying missions with a wingman who would call out flak. In the spring of 1952, the squadron received some RF-80s from other reconnaissance units and F-80Cs rendered surplus by upgrading fighter units and converted to reconnaissance configuration. It took some time to convert the F-80Cs to include a photgraphic reconnaissance capability, but they proved adequate for the squadron's visual reconnaissance mission. With the use of the RF-80Ca, the squadron no longer specialized in visual reconnaissance, but along with the 15th Tactical Reconnaissance Squadron performed both visual and photographic missions. In addition, the squadron added five North American RF-86A Sabres to its strenghth. The Sabres were able to operate photographic missions without fighter cover, although their photographic capabilities were limited.

At its base at Taegu, and later at Kimpo Air Base (K-14), rapid film processing by the squadron was performed when the Mustangs returned from their missions. These photos were supposed to be passed over to the Army, who would provide their own photo interpreters; however as the Army lacked interpreters early in the conflict, therefore the Air Force handled the interpretation needs initially until the Army photo interpreters could arrive from the United States.

As the U.N. offensive moved across the 38th parallel into North Korea, it was found that the squadron's pilots often had to fend for themselves since the Mustangs couldn't outrun the communist jets they would encounter. However the Mustang had the advantage of out-turning the MiGs and could fly lower than the jets. Also the MiGs would run out of fuel in a few minutes and turn back while the squadron's Mustangs could return to flying photo reconnaissance. The squadron had much success with a technique called "Circle 10", whereby the pilots flew a ten-mile radius circle around an area where enemy activity was sighted the night before. The pilots would fly in the next day and note if something was out of place; the pilots of the 45th then would notify Republic F-84 Thunderjet fighter-bomber pilots who would be dispatched to destroy enemy equipment or emplacements. Also the pilots of the 45th would often join in, using the Mustang's ground attack capabilities to shoot up targets of opportunity until the Thunderjets would come in with napalm bombs.

In August 1952, the RF-51s, becoming war-weary, were replaced by Lockheed RF-80A and RF-80C Shooting Star jet reconnaissance aircraft. One of the first missions flown by the squadron was to fly over a political school in North Korea which was reportedly training subversives to penetrate into South Korea. The squadron overflew the suspected school, and on 25 October, the target was attacked by some Douglas B-26 Invaders and destroyed. Over 1,000 students training for intelligence work at the school were reportedly killed. On 1 January 1953, the 45th was redesignated the 45th Tactical Reconnaissance Squadron, Photographic-Jet.

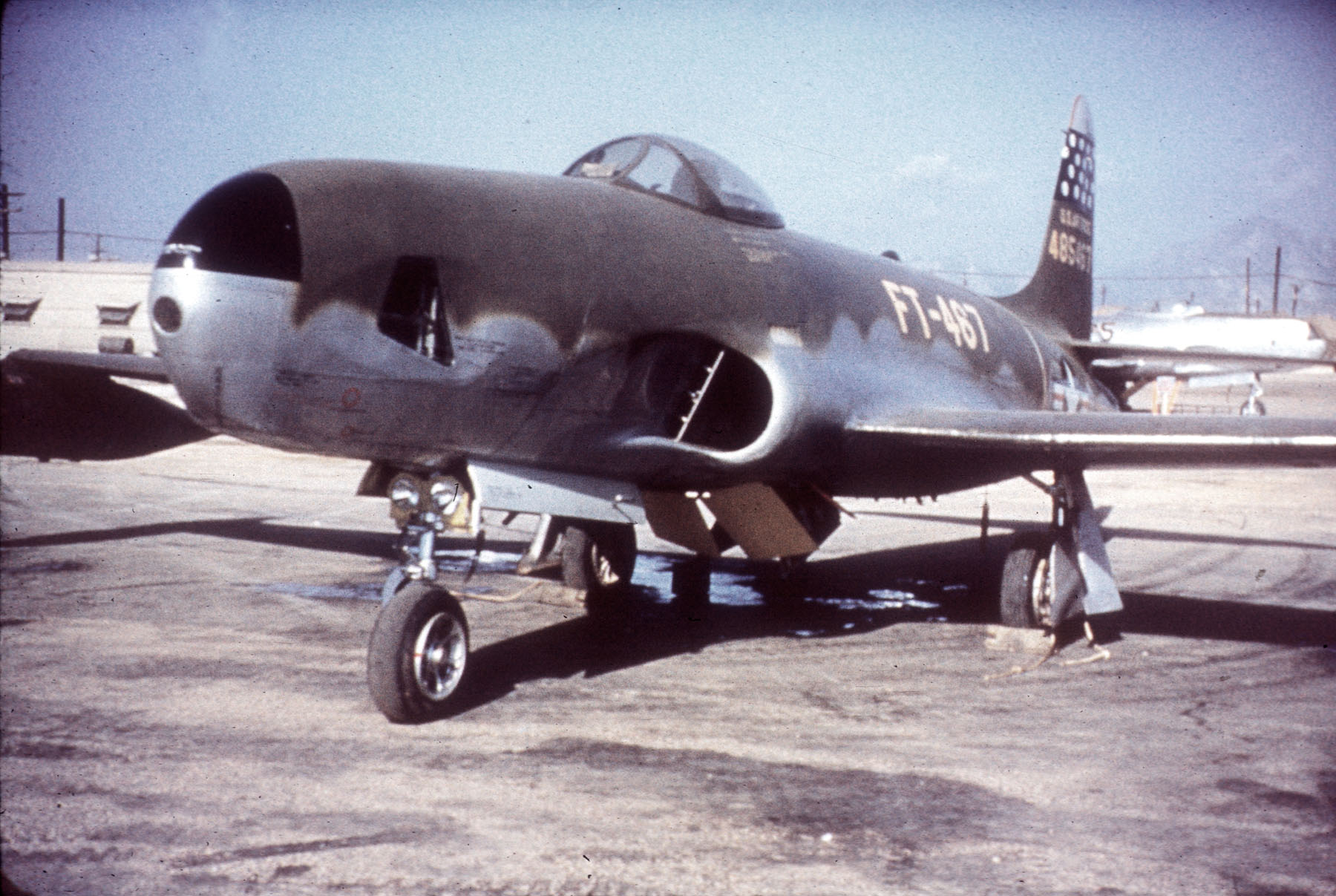
A 45th TRS RF-80A during the Korean War

On 12 July 1953, squadron pilots on a reconnaissance mission revealed North Korean preparation for an attack on the stabilized front line. The communists had chosen a period of relatively bad weather to use as cover for the buildup for the attack; however the 45th had identified eighty-five enemy targets with low-flying aerial photography of the area. A B-29 raid was ordered and using SHORAN Radar to bomb through the cloud cover, the enemy forces building up for the attack were broken up.

The last mission in the Korean War for the 45th was to take part in a maximum effort to photograph every airfield in North Korea just before the armistice was scheduled to take place on 27 July 1953. Also, clandestinely, airfields in Manchuria that had a potential for attacking U.N. Forces after the armistice began were to be photographed. A pilot of the 45th, flying an RF-80, was killed when shot down near the Yalu River. He was the last man killed in combat during the Korean War. The sortie he was flying was taken over by another pilot of the 45th, who returned to Kimpo at dusk.

After the armistice in Korea, the squadron remained at Kimpo. Its mission was to be ready in case of a resumption of combat on the peninsula. It still operated aircraft along the Korean demilitarized zone, monitoring the border for communist aggression and provided photographic and electronic intelligence for areas and of targets of particular interest to Fifth Air Force (Project "Hawkeye"). It provided and maintained visual surveillance of Communist and United Nations forces activities; occasionally directed adjustment of long range artillery and naval gunfire during cease-fire violations.

In March 1955, the squadron withdrew to Misawa Air Base, Japan where it was equipped with the Republic RF-84F Thunderflash. Its parent wing, the 67th Tactical Reconnaissance Wing, was the sole USAF reconnaissance wing in the Pacific. The exact work of the squadron over the balance of the late 1950s and early 1960s remains classified to this day, but it is believed that there were reconnaissance missions flown over Communist China and southeastern portions of the Soviet Union by its aircraft.

=== Vietnam War ===
In August 1958, the squadron's subsonic Thunderjets were replaced by the supersonic McDonnell RF-101C Voodoo, the first supersonic tactical reconnaissance aircraft in the USAF inventory. In the early 1960s, the United States began to become more and more involved in the ongoing conflict in Vietnam. A detachment of the squadron was sent from Japan to Don Muang Royal Thai Air Force Base, co-located with Bangkok's international airport, in Thailand, to fly high-speed reconnaissance missions over South Vietnam. The detachment remained in Thailand until May 1962 and it returned to Misawa. It returned to Bangkok in November 1962, staying about a month until again returning home.

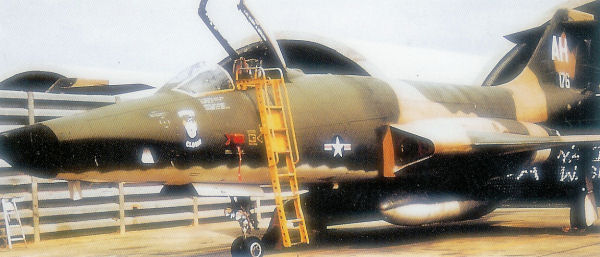
Squadron RF-101C at Tan Son Nhut Air Base, 1969 (Note: Aircraft is McDonnell RF-101C serial 56–0176.)

In December 1962, another detachment was deployed to Tan Son Nhut Air Base, near Saigon, South Vietnam. Its mission was to fly intelligence gathering flights. Squadron aircraft and personnel began rotational temporary duty to Tan Son Nhut, which continued until November 1965. When the squadron began operations in Southeast Asia, the missions were initially medium-altitude single-aircraft flights over South Vietnam, although two-ship missions were allocated to particularly well-defended areas.

The unit was redesignated the 45th Tactical Reconnaissance Squadron on 1 January 1967. It operated from Udorn Royal Thai Air Force Base, Thailand in 1966, then returned to Tan Son Nhut where it operated until withdrawn in December 1970 and returned to Misawa as part of the withdrawal of United States forces from South Vietnam. The usefulness of the RF-101 to the war effort was, in large part, the reason for the aircraft to remain in the inventory throughout the 1960s. Upon its return to Misawa, the squadron's aircraft, now relatively war-weary from nearly a decade of flying combat missions, were retired and the squadron became non-operational. It was inactivated on 31 May 1971.

=== Tactical Air Command ===
On 15 October 1971, the squadron was activated at Bergstrom Air Force Base, Texas as a McDonnell RF-4C Phantom II squadron. Its parent 67th Tactical Reconnaissance Wing replaced the 75th Tactical Reconnaissance Wing, with the squadron assuming the personnel, mission and equipment of the 4th Tactical Reconnaissance Squadron, which was simultaneously inactivated.

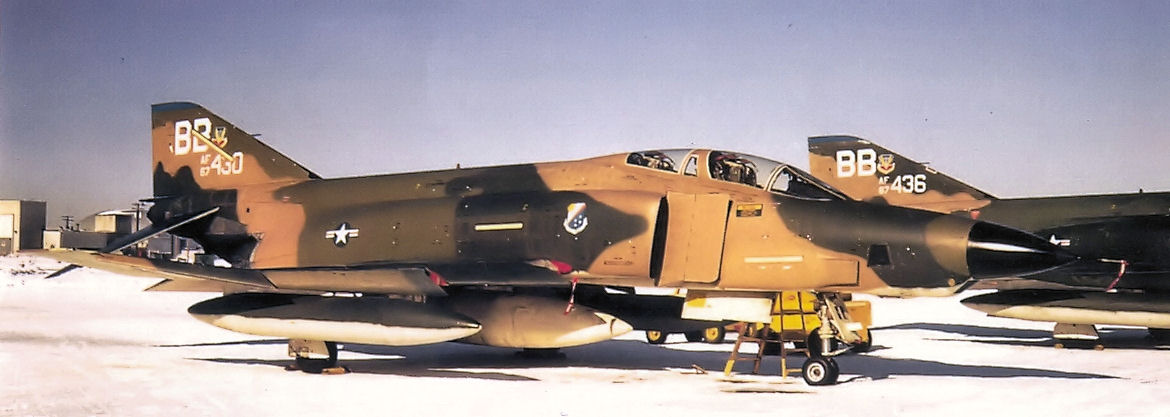
Squadron TRS RF-4Cs on the ramp at Bergstrom AFB, 1972 (Note: McDonnell RF-4C-33-MC Phantom II serial 67-0430 is in the foreground.)

The squadron continued its mission of maintaining tactical reconnaissance mission forces capable of meeting worldwide operational requirements. The 45th participated in various training exercises while at Bergstrom. In the wake of the post-Vietnam reduction of the Air Force, the squadron was inactivated on 31 October 1975 and its aircraft were transferred to Shaw Air Force Base, South Carolina, where they equipped the 363d Tactical Reconnaissance Wing.

On 8 September 1981 the 45th was again reactivated as the 45th Tactical Reconnaissance Training Squadron. The 363d Tactical Reconnaissance Wing was transitioning from to the General Dynamics F-16 Fighting Falcon as a tactical fighter wing and its RF-4Cs were moved to Bergstrom. It began operations at Bergstrom on 1 April 1982. The unit trained over 600 students and supported numerous operational deployments and exercises until it was inactivated on 30 September 1989, when the RF-4C was being withdrawn from the inventory.

=== Air Combat Command RC/WC/OC/TC-135 Operations ===
The squadron was redesignated the 45th Reconnaissance Squadron and, on 1 July 1994, was activated at Offutt Air Force Base, Nebraska. It assumed the mission of the former 24th Reconnaissance Squadron, which was simultaneously inactivated.

The last WC-135W was retired on September 7, 2022, it is being replaced by the WC-135R which began arriving on July 11, 2022.

== Lineage ==
- Constituted as the 423d Night Fighter Squadron on 17 August 1943

Activated on 1 October 1943
Redesignated 155th Photographic Reconnaissance Squadron on 22 June 1944
Redesignated 45th Reconnaissance Squadron, Night Photographic on 3 December 1945
Redesignated 45th Tactical Reconnaissance Squadron, Night Photographic on 1 July 1948
Inactivated on 25 March 1949

- Redesignated 45th Tactical Reconnaissance Squadron on 19 September 1950

Activated on 26 September 1950
Redesignated 45th Tactical Reconnaissance Squadron, Photographic-Jet on 1 January 1953
Redesignated 45th Tactical Reconnaissance Squadron on 1 January 1967
Inactivated on 31 May 1971

- Activated on 15 October 1971

Inactivated on 31 October 1975

- Redesignated 45th Tactical Reconnaissance Training Squadron on 8 September 1981

Activated on 1 April 1982
Inactivated on 30 September 1989

- Redesignated 45th Reconnaissance Squadron on 24 June 1994

Activated on 1 July 1994

=== Assignments ===
- Air Defense Department, AAF School of Applied Tactics, 1 October 1943 (attached to 481st Night Fighter Operational Training Group)
- 481st Night Fighter Operational Training Group, 1 November 1943
- IX Tactical Air Command, 18 April 1944
- 10th Photographic Group, 17 May 1944
- IX Tactical Air Command, 16 February 1945
- 67th Tactical Reconnaissance Group, 21 February 1945 (attached to 9th Tactical Reconnaissance Group (Provisional) after 25 April 1945)
- 363d Tactical Reconnaissance Group, 23 May 1945
- IX Tactical Air Command, 12 July 1945
- 64th Fighter Wing, 1 August 1945
- 10th Reconnaissance Group, 24 November 1945
- 86th Composite Group, 15 May 1947
- United States Air Forces in Europe, 14 January 1948
- 7300th Air Force Composite Wing, 1 July 1948
- United States Air Forces in Europe, 13 August 1948 – 25 March 1949 (attached to 36th Fighter Wing)
- 543d Tactical Support Group, 26 September 1950
- 314th Air Division, 1 December 1950 (attached to 49th Fighter-Bomber Wing after 27 December 1950)
- 67th Tactical Reconnaissance Group, 25 February 1951 (attached to 67th Tactical Reconnaissance Wing, 1 June-25 Nov 1954 and after 1 July 1957)
- 67th Tactical Reconnaissance Wing, 1 October 1957
- 39th Air Division, 25 April 1960 (attached to 460th Tactical Reconnaissance Wing after 8 July 1966) (Note: Detachment 1, 45 Tactical Reconnaissance Squadron was officially attached, but essentially the entire squadron was contained in Detachment 1.)
- 475th Tactical Fighter Wing, 15 January 1968 (remained attached to 460th Tactical Reconnaissance Wing)
- Fifth Air Force, 15 March-31 May 1971
- 67th Tactical Reconnaissance Wing, 15 October 1971 – 31 October 1975 (attached to 10th Tactical Reconnaissance Wing, 13 June–7 July 1973)
- 67th Tactical Reconnaissance Wing, 1 April 1982 – 30 September 1989
- 55th Operations Group, 1 July 1994 – present

=== Stations ===
- Orlando Army Air Base, Florida, 1 October 1943
- Kern County Airport, CA, 29 January-26 Mar 1944
- RAF Charmy Down (AAF-487), England, 18 April 1944
- RAF Chalgrove (AAF-465), England, 20 May 1944
- Rennes Airfield (A-27), France, c. 10 August 1944
- Chateaudun Airfield (A-39), France, 28 August 1944
- St-Dizier Airfield (A-64), France, c. 12 September 1944
- Le Culot Airfield (A-89), Belgium, c. 13 February 1945
- Maastricht Airfield (Y-44), the Netherlands, c. 4 April 1945
- AAF Station Kassel/Rothwesten (R-12), Germany, c. 10 July 1945
- AAF Station Darmstadt/Griesheim (Y-35), Germany, 28 September 1945
- AAF Station Fürth (R-28), Germany, 24 November 1945
- Fürstenfeldbruck Air Base, Germany, 26 March 1947 – 25 March 1949
- Itazuke Air Base, Japan, 26 September 1950
- Komaki AB, Japan, 23 October 1950
- Taegu Air Base (K-9), South Korea, 27 December 1950
- Kimpo Air Base (K-14), South Korea, 18 August 1951
- Misawa Air Base, Japan, 3 March 1955 – 31 May 1971

Detachment at Don Muang Royal Thai Air Force Base, Thailand, Nov 1961-1 May 1962 and 14 November-14 Dec 1962
Detachment at Tan Son Nhut Air Base, South Vietnam, 14 December 1962 – 5 May 1963, 1 November 1963 – 3 May 1964, and 1 February-6 Nov 1965
Detachment at Udorn Royal Thai Air Force Base, Thailand, 1 November 1965 – 15 August 1966
Deployed at: Tan Son Nhut Air Base, South Vietnam, Jul 1966-31 December 1970

- Bergstrom Air Force Base, Texas, 15 October 1971 – 31 October 1975

Deployed at RAF Alconbury, England, 13 June-7 Jul 1973

- Bergstrom AFB, Texas, 1 April 1982 – 30 September 1989
- Offutt Air Force Base, Nebraska, 1 July 1994 – present

=== Aircraft ===
- Douglas P-70 Havoc, 1943–1944
- Douglas A-20 Havoc, 1943–1945
- Douglas F-3 Havoc, 1944–1945
- A-26 (later, B-26) Invader, 1945–1949
- North American F-6 Mustang, 1946–1948
- B-17 Flying Fortress, 1948
- North American F-51 Mustang, 1950–1953
- Lockheed F-80 Shooting Star, 1952–1955
- Lockheed RF-80 Shooting Star, 1952–1955
- Republic RF-84F Thunderflash, 1955–1958
- McDonnell RF-101 Voodoo, 1958–1970
- McDonnell RF-4C Phantom II, 1971–1975; 1982–1989
- OC-135, 1994 – 2021
- RC-135S/U, 1994 – present
- WC-135, 1994 – present
- TC-135, 1994 – present

== See also ==
- 481st Night Fighter Operational Training Group
