= Boeing WC-135 Constant Phoenix =

Atmospheric sampling aircraft by Boeing

WC-135 Constant Phoenix
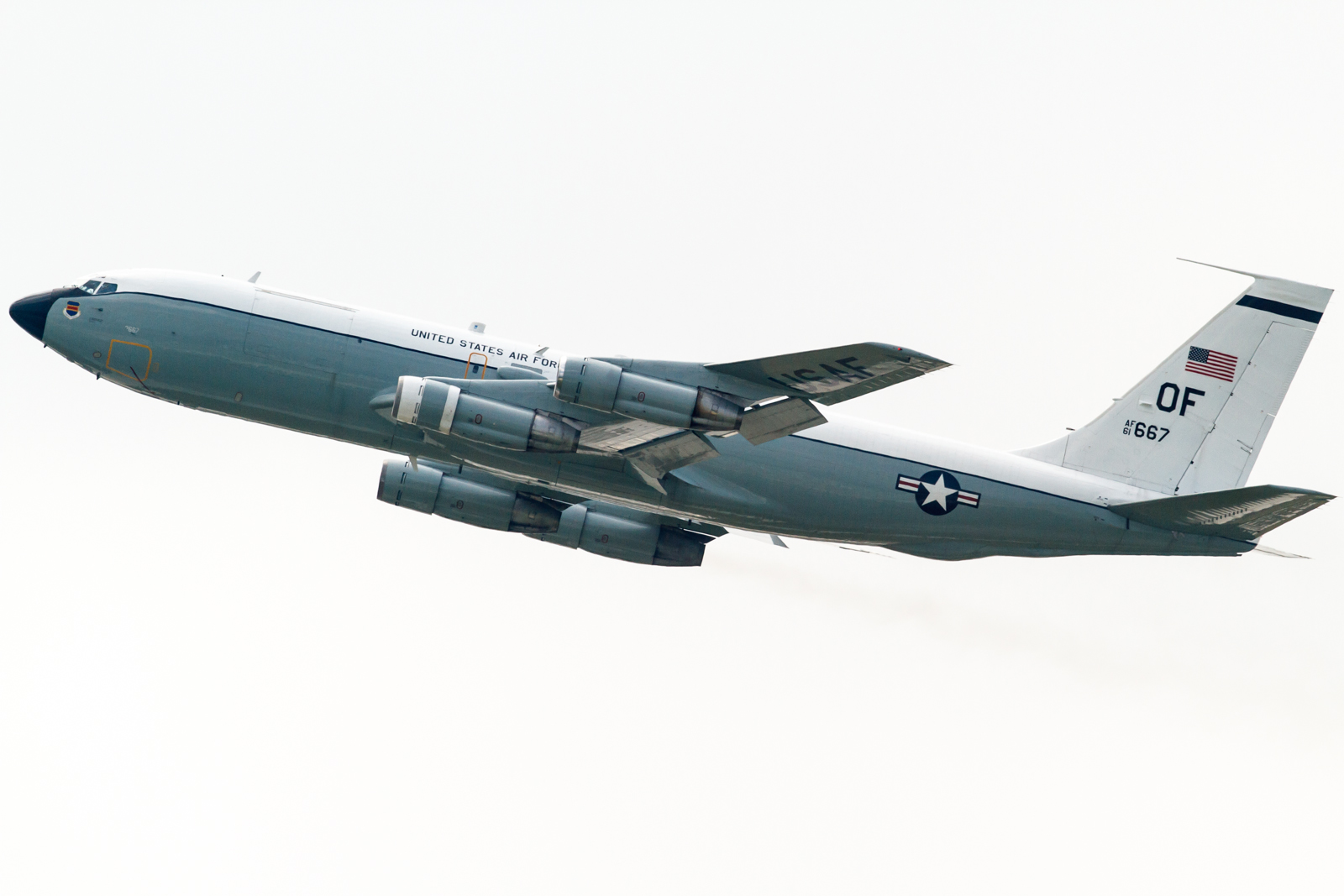
- A WC-135 Constant Phoenix on takeoff

General information
- Type: Atmosphere testing related to nuclear incidents
- Manufacturer: Boeing Military Airplanes Division
- Status: 3 aircraft in service (WC-135R)
- Primary user: United States Air Force
- Number built: 14 (10 converted C-135B, one converted EC-135C, three converted KC-135R)

History
- Introduction date: December 1965
- Developed from: Boeing C-135 Stratolifter
- Variant: Boeing OC-135B Open Skies

The WC-135 Constant Phoenix is a special-purpose aircraft derived from the Boeing C-135 Stratolifter and used by the United States Air Force. Its mission is to collect samples from the atmosphere for the purpose of detecting and identifying nuclear explosions. It is also informally referred to as the "weather bird" or "the sniffer" by workers on the program and international media respectively.

== Operational history ==
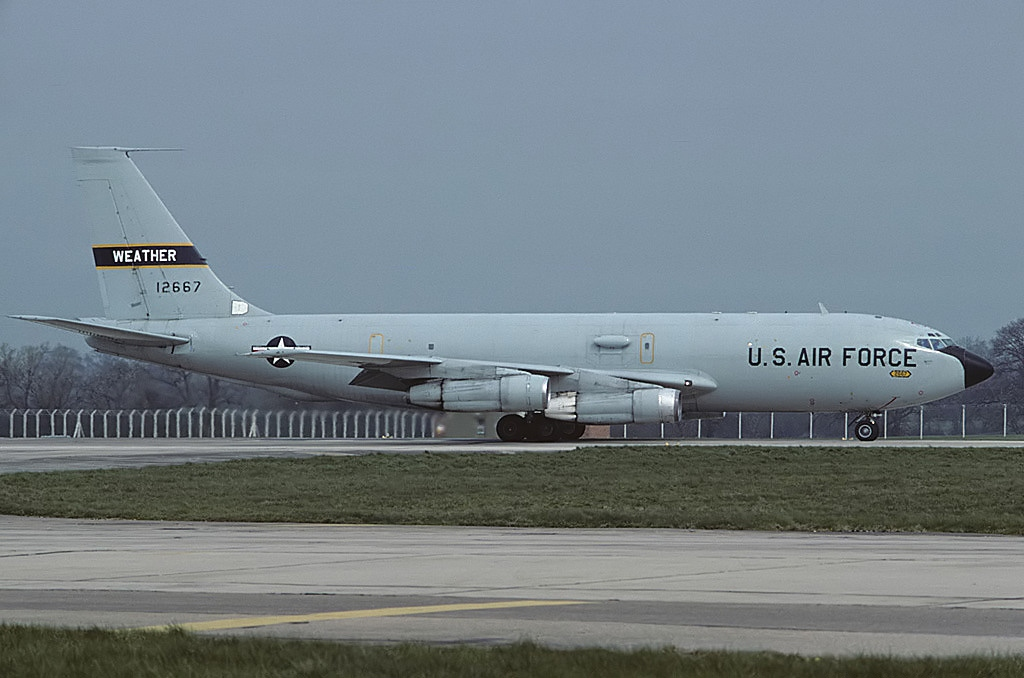
A WC-135B at Fairford in 1988. This aircraft later became a WC-135W.

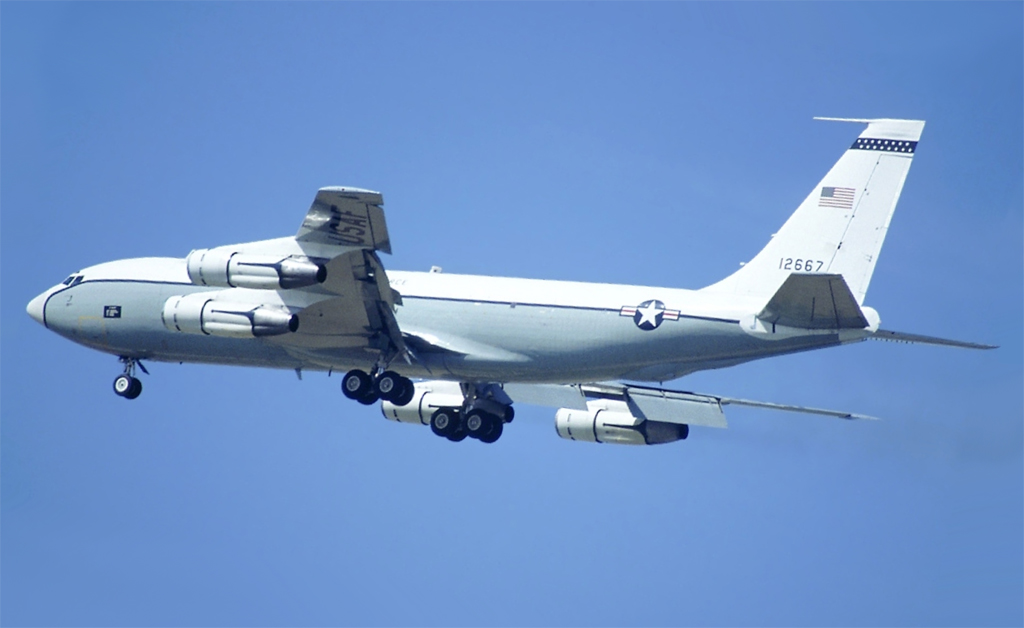
The same aircraft seen at RAF Alconbury in 1992

The WC-135 was introduced in December 1965, replacing Boeing WB-50 aircraft in the weather-reconnaissance and air-sampling mission. Ten aircraft were initially converted from C-135B transport aircraft and were placed in service with the 55th Weather Reconnaissance Squadron at McClellan Air Force Base, California, with the Military Airlift Command (MAC). Detachments were located at various bases throughout the United States and worldwide. Initially, the aircraft performed both weather reconnaissance and atmospheric sampling missions; however, in February 1974, the Air Force ordered that after 1 July 1974, WC-135s be used for atmospheric sampling missions only, thus ending the aircraft's weather reconnaissance mission. The aircraft occasionally took on other roles throughout their careers; several aircraft were temporarily assigned to the 10th Airborne Command and Control Squadron at RAF Mildenhall in the late 1980s and early 1990s as training aircraft so that the unit could slow the accumulation of flight hours on its EC-135Hs, while others served as staff transports on an as-needed basis.

Upon retirement from frontline weather reconnaissance service in the early 1990s, five were retained for further use. Serial no. 61-2666 was converted to an NC-135 and remains in service as a testbed for RC-135 equipment upgrades. Serial no. 61-2667 was upgraded to a WC-135W, given the project name Constant Phoenix, and remains in service with the 45th Reconnaissance Squadron at Offutt Air Force Base, Nebraska. Serial no. 61-2674 was converted to the first OC-135B Open Skies observation aircraft, reentering service in 1993. It was later stored in 1997 and replaced with two additional aircraft also converted from WC-135s.

In 1998, a former EC-135C, serial no. 62-3582, was converted into a WC-135C, also designated Constant Phoenix.

In April 2018 it was announced that three KC-135R tanker aircraft would be converted as WC-135R Constant Phoenix aircraft to replace the two aircraft operated by the 45th Reconnaissance Squadron. The first aircraft was scheduled to be converted by L3 Technologies at Greenville, Texas starting in September 2019.

In November 2020, WC-135C, tail number 62-3582, was retired during a ceremony at Offutt Air Force Base, Nebraska. During its 56 year career, it amassed 29,680 flight hours and 72,251 landings. During its retirement ceremony, the 55th Wing chaplain dubbed the aircraft "Lucifer's Chariot", although the aircraft was never referred to by that name during its operational life.

In June 2022, the first of three planned WC-135R aircraft (serial number 64-14836) completed its maiden test flight, and was delivered to the 55th Wing on 11 July 2022. The other two were delivered in May 2023 (tail number 64-14831) and December 2023 (tail number 64-14829)

== Mission ==
The WC-135B, WC-135W, and WC-135R Constant Phoenix atmospheric-collection aircraft support national-level intelligence consumers by collecting particulate debris and gaseous effluents from accessible regions of the atmosphere in support of the Limited Nuclear Test Ban Treaty of 1963. The information collected by the aircraft is utilized by Detachment 1 of the Air Force Technical Applications Center's 21st Surveillance Squadron.

== Features ==
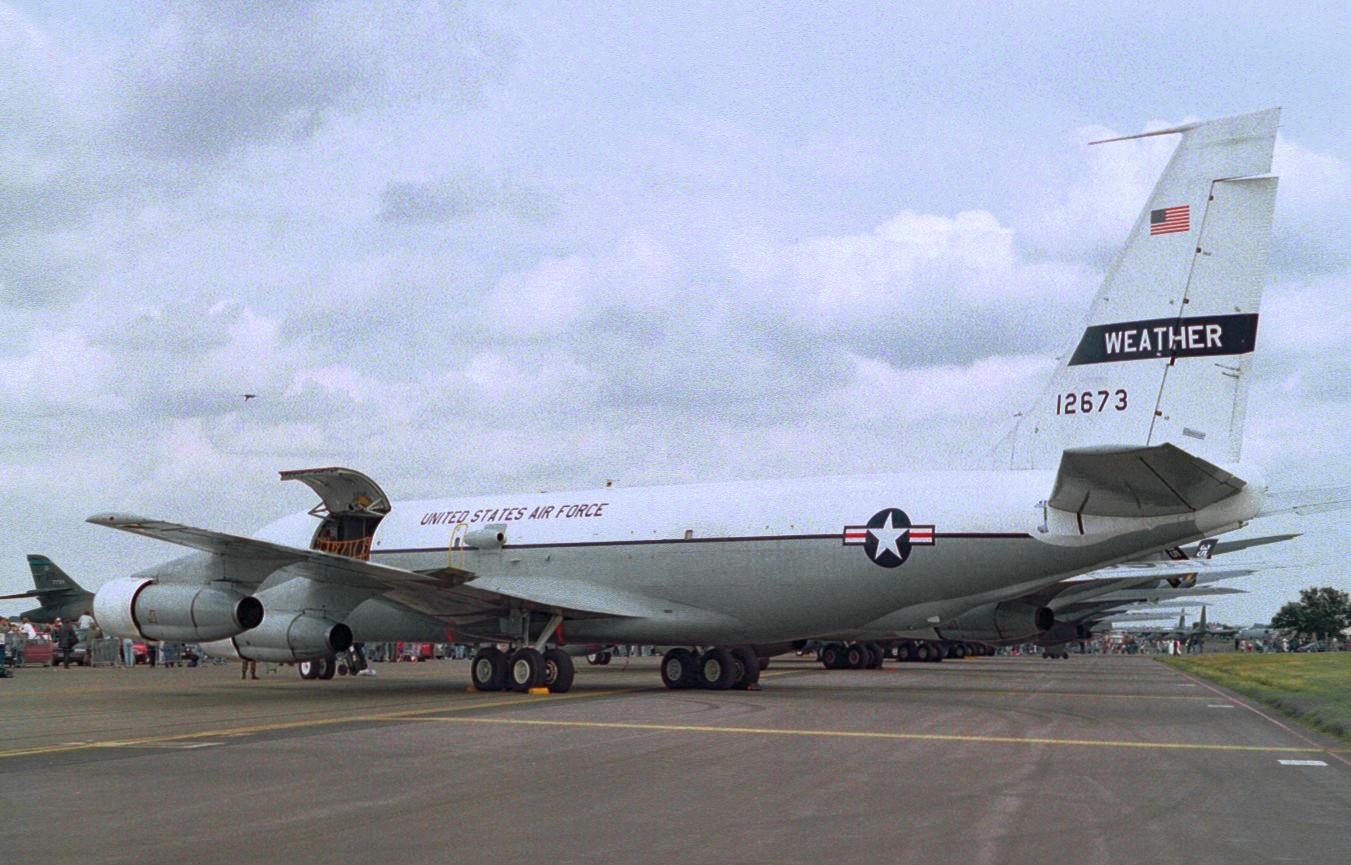
61-2673 Boeing WC-135B at RIAT 1993. In this image the external air-sampling pod is visible (immediately underneath the word 'States')

The Constant Phoenix's modifications are primarily related to the aircraft's on-board atmospheric collection suite, which allows the mission crew to detect radioactive debris "clouds" in real time. The aircraft is equipped with external flow-through devices to collect particulates on filter paper and a compressor system for whole air samples collected in high-pressure holding spheres. Despite the different designations, both the C- and W-models carry the same mission equipment (with a front-end avionics suite similar to the RC-135V and W aircraft). In addition to its collection systems, the WC-135 is equipped with a variety of aircrew safety systems which detect ambient air inside the cabin to detect radiation which may have contaminated the inside of the cabin. The cabin also contains two sets of air filtration systems, known as the "lungs", which filter all air entering the cabin of any hazardous contaminants. The WC-135R uses an improved next-generation collection suite as compared to the WC-135C/W, however the primary system functions are generally similar.

The interior seats 33 people, including the cockpit crew, maintenance personnel, and special equipment operators from the Air Force Technical Applications Center. On operational sorties, the crew is minimized to just pilots, navigator, and special-equipment operators, to reduce radiation exposure to mission-essential personnel only.

== Variants ==
- WC-135B - 10 initial aircraft, converted from C-135Bs
- WC-135C - Converted from former Looking Glass EC-135C Tail Number 62-3582, carries the same equipment as WC-135W
- WC-135R - 3 converted KC-135Rs, announced in 2018 and included on the FY19 budget request. The first converted aircraft, Tail Number 64-14836, was delivered in July 2022.
- WC-135W - Re-designation of WC-135B Tail Number 61-2667 after upgrades and removal of flight engineer crew position in the 1990s.

== Operators ==
United States

- United States Air Force – Air Combat Command
  - 55th Wing – Offutt AFB, Nebraska
    - 45th Reconnaissance Squadron

== Specifications ==
General characteristics

- Crew: 4 flight crew + mission crew
- Length: 139 ft 11 in (42.65 m)
- Wingspan: 130 ft 10 in (39.88 m)
- Height: 42 ft (13 m)
- Wing area: 2,433 sq ft (226.0 m^{2})
- Airfoil: root: BAC 310/311/312; tip: BAC 313
- Max takeoff weight: 300,500 lb (136,305 kg)
- Powerplant: 4 × Pratt & Whitney TF33-P-9 (WC-135C) / Pratt & Whitney TF33-P-5 (WC-135W) turbofan engines, 16,050 lbf (71.4 kN) thrust each
- Powerplant: 4 × CFM International F108-CF-100 (WC-135R) turbofan engines, 21,600 lbf (96.2 kN) thrust each

Performance

- Maximum speed: 403 mph (649 km/h, 350 kn)
- Range: 4,000 mi (6,400 km, 3,500 nmi)
- Service ceiling: 40,000 ft (12,000 m)
- Wing loading: 123.5 lb/sq ft (603 kg/m^{2})
- Thrust/weight: 0.21

== Activities ==
=== Vela Incident ===
WC-135B aircraft flew 25 sorties in 1979 to try to ascertain whether a double flash in the South Atlantic that was detected by a Vela satellite was a nuclear weapons test; however, the result was inconclusive.

=== North Korea ===
On October 6, 2006, Japan's Kyodo News agency reported that a US military aircraft, equipped to detect radiation from a nuclear test, took off from southern Japan. This was believed to be part of US efforts to prepare to monitor a North Korean nuclear test. On October 9, 2006, North Korea's official Korean Central News Agency (KCNA) reported that the country had performed a successful underground nuclear test. On October 13, 2006, CNN reported: "The U.S. Air Force flew a WC-135 Constant Phoenix atmospheric collection aircraft on Tuesday to collect air samples from the region. A preliminary analysis of air samples from North Korea shows 'radioactive debris consistent with a North Korea nuclear test', according to a statement from the office of the top U.S. intelligence official. The statement, from the office of Director of National Intelligence John Negroponte, was sent to Capitol Hill but not released publicly. CNN obtained it from a congressional source. The national intelligence office statement said the air samples were collected Wednesday, and analysis found debris that would be consistent with a nuclear test 'in the vicinity of Punggye' on Monday. The South Korean Defense Ministry told CNN that the United States has informed it that radioactivity has been detected." The aircraft was based at Offutt AFB and was sent to Kadena Air Base on Okinawa to operate during the sampling missions.

On June 17, 2009, JoongAng Daily reported, in reference to a purported May 25 nuclear test by North Korea: "The U.S. Air Force twice dispatched a special reconnaissance jet, the WC-135 Constant Phoenix from Kadena Air Base in Okinawa, Japan, to collect air samples."

On November 23, 2010, Sankei Shimbun reported that a WC-135 had been moved to Kadena Air Base in September 2010, in anticipation of a North Korean nuclear test.

On January 31, 2013, the WC-135W was reported to be conducting surveillance flights out of Kadena Air Base in anticipation of another North Korean nuclear test.

On January 6, 2016, the United States Air Force confirmed plans to soon deploy the WC-135 to test for radiation near North Korea to examine North Korea's claim that they had successfully conducted a hydrogen-bomb test on January 5 (EST).

On September 8, 2016, it was reported that the WC-135 would soon begin surveillance flights near the Korean Peninsula after South Korean officials confirmed that North Korea conducted its fifth nuclear test at approximately 0:30 UTC.

On April 12, 2017, it was deployed to Okinawa amid rising tensions with North Korea. North Korea conducted a missile test on April 3, 2017.

On May 19, 2017, two Chinese Su-30 fighter jets intercepted a WC-135 over the East China Sea, prompting a formal complaint from the Pentagon.

=== Japan ===
On March 17, 2011, CNN reported that the WC-135W had been deployed from Offutt AFB to Eielson Air Force Base in Alaska. From there it assisted in detecting radioactive materials in the atmosphere around Japan, monitoring radioactivity released from the Fukushima I Nuclear Power Plant caused by the magnitude 9.0 earthquake and subsequent tsunami of March 11, 2011.

=== Europe ===
In 1986, multiple WC-135Bs were deployed to Europe and Alaska to help monitor the air after the Chernobyl disaster.

On February 17, 2017, it was reported that the WC-135C had been deployed to RAF Mildenhall. It was conjectured that this came in response to several reports of anomalous levels of iodine-131 coming from the Norwegian-Russian Border, but as of April 10, 2017, there was no official cause of the iodine-131 release.

In late July and early August 2021 a WC-135W deployed to Europe and carried out measurements over the Baltic Sea and Sweden. A connection is suspected with the technical problems of the Russian Oscar-II-class submarine Orel, which subsequently had to be tugged back.

== See also ==
- Bhangmeter

Related development

- Boeing C-135 Stratolifter
- Boeing KC-135 Stratotanker
- Boeing OC-135B Open Skies
- Boeing RC-135

Aircraft of comparable role, configuration, and era

- WC-130

Related lists

- List of active United States military aircraft
