= Boeing C-135 Stratolifter =

Military transport aircraft by Boeing

C-135 Stratolifter
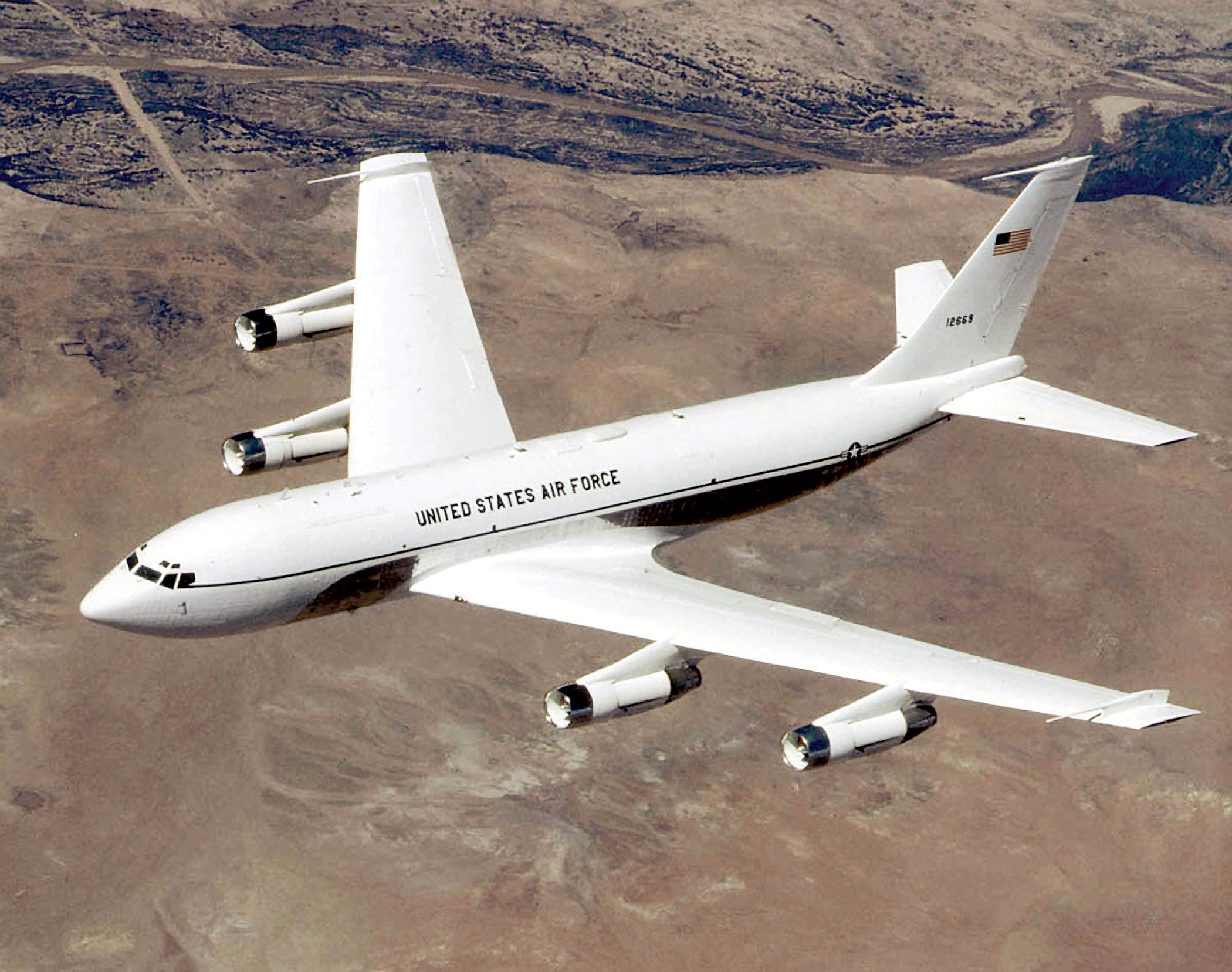
- C-135C Speckled Trout

General information
- Type: Military transport aircraft
- National origin: United States
- Manufacturer: Boeing
- Status: In limited service
- Primary user: United States Air Force
- Number built: 45

History
- Manufactured: 1960–1963
- Introduction date: August 1961
- First flight: 23 June 1961
- Developed from: Boeing KC-135 Stratotanker
- Variants: Boeing EC-135; Boeing NC-135; Boeing RC-135; Boeing WC-135 Constant Phoenix

The Boeing C-135 Stratolifter is a transport aircraft developed from the Boeing KC-135 Stratotanker. The aircraft eventually served as a basis for a number of variants performing various different roles. Since the first one was built in August 1956, the C-135 and its variants have been a fixture of the United States Air Force.

== Origins and operational history ==
In the early 1960s, the Military Air Transport Service operated a fleet consisting almost entirely of propeller-driven aircraft such as the piston-powered Douglas C-124 Globemaster II and C-133 Cargomaster turboprop. While capable of carrying large, outsized payloads, they were becoming increasingly obsolescent and lacked the global reach required of the rapidly-modernizing Air Force. In May 1960, Congress approved the purchase of 50 C-135 aircraft; it was selected in part because of its low development cost, being a straightforward derivative of the KC-135 tanker already in production. Ultimately, only 15 C-135As would be produced (in addition to three converted from KC-135s while still on the assembly line), with 30 additional aircraft being delivered as C-135Bs with the improved Pratt & Whitney TF33 turbofan engine.

The C-135 was largely intended as an interim measure pending the development of more specialized jet transports such as the Lockheed C-141 Starlifter, and as such it incorporated numerous compromises in its strategic airlift capability. The aircraft's load floor was some 10 feet (3.0 m) off the ground, which required ground-handling equipment, its single side-loading cargo door was limited in what could fit through it, and its useful range was approximately 6,000 miles (9,700 km), insufficient to reach many of the Air Force's operating locations in Asia and the Pacific Rim. While range was greatly improved over earlier transports, it could not be augmented by aerial refueling, as C-135s were not configured with refueling receptacles. Additionally, its takeoff and landing performance required long runways available only at the largest military bases or commercial airports, which were not necessarily located in close proximity to potential combat areas.

The Lockheed C-141 entered front-line service in April 1965, which finally gave MATS and its successor, Military Airlift Command, the strategic airlift capability it needed. By the early 1970s, the C-135 fleet had been modified and relegated to other duties, which included staff/VIP transport, systems testing, and strategic reconnaissance.

== Variants ==
The large majority of the 820 airframes of this type built were KC-135A Stratotankers, equipped to provide mid-air refueling to other aircraft. Forty-five base-model aircraft were built as C-135A or C-135B transports with the tanking equipment excluded; three more aircraft originally ordered as KC-135A were factory converted to C-135A. The C-135/KC-135 type was also known internally at Boeing as the Model 717, a name later assigned to a completely different aircraft.

=== C-135A/E ===
Eighteen C-135As (Boeing model number 717-157), powered by Pratt & Whitney J57 turbojets, were built. In later years, almost all were upgraded with Pratt & Whitney TF33 turbofan engines and wide-span horizontal stabilizers, and were re-designated C-135E. Most were converted to various special roles, including airborne command posts, missile-tracking platforms, and VIP transports, and were withdrawn throughout the 1990s. The C-135E designation was also applied to EC-135Ns that were used in the combat support role.

=== C-135B ===
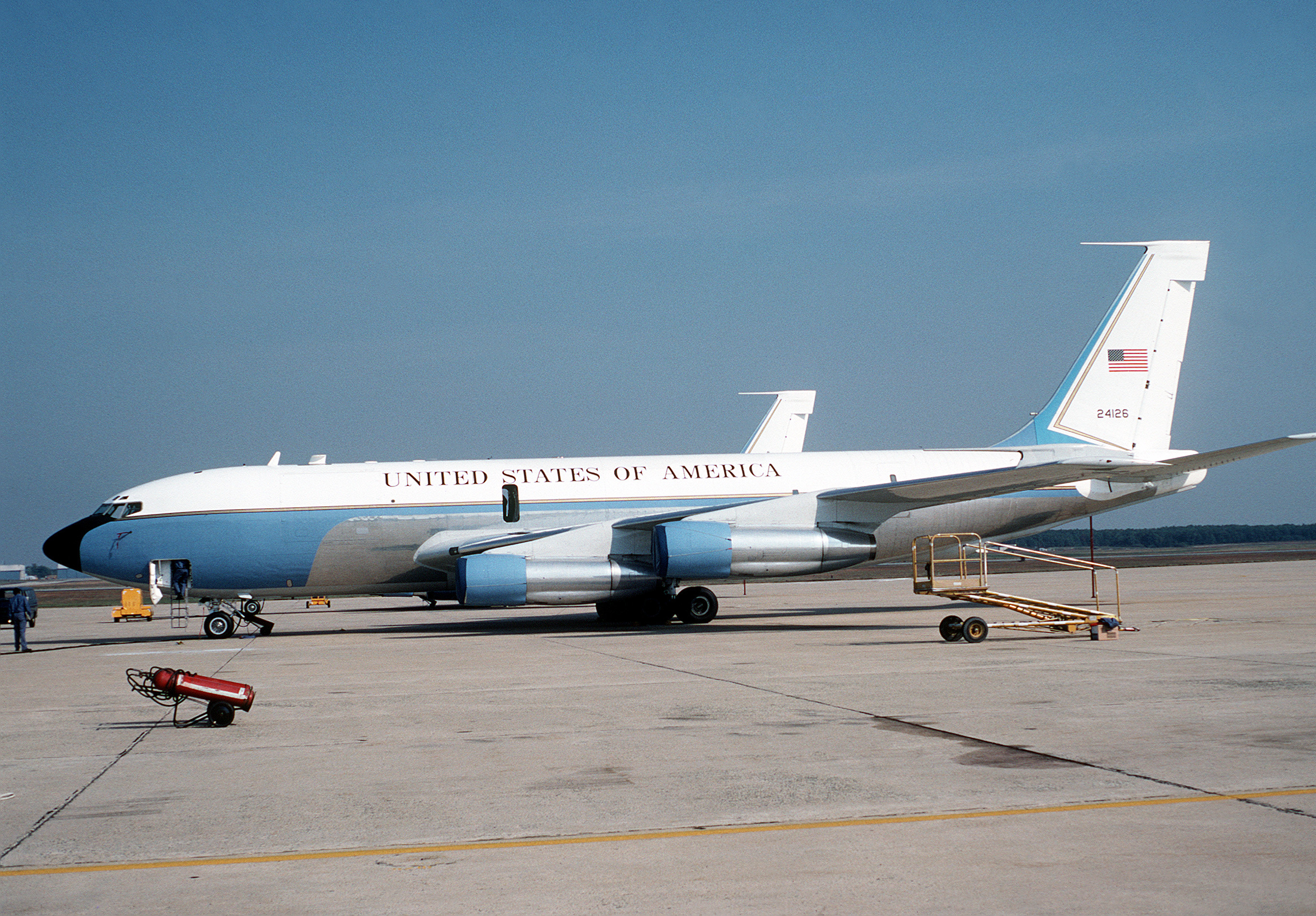
C-135B Stratolifter for VIP transport parked on the flight line at Andrews AFB

Thirty C-135Bs (Boeing model number 717-158) were built new with the TF33 turbofan and improved wide-span horizontal stabilizers. Ten were modified for a weather reconnaissance (flying through radioactive clouds from nuclear tests or other agents) role and designated WC-135B Stratolifter (Constant Phoenix in later versions). Additional airframes were converted to RC-135s from the 1970s to 2006, and remain in service with further equipment upgrades installed.

=== C-135C ===
The C-135C designation applies to three WC-135B (originally converted from C-135B) weather reconnaissance aircraft, which were de-modified to transport status. Most of the other C-135Bs were converted to various special mission variants following their service with the Military Airlift Command. C-135Cs also retained their air refueling receptacle, added during modifications to WC-135 standard.

Although most of the remaining C-135 aircraft are used for transporting senior military leaders and other high-ranking dignitaries, the C-135C communications aircraft serves as an aerial test-bed for emerging technologies. Developmental tests using this aircraft have demonstrated the capability to fly precision approaches using a local area differential GPS system. This modified C-135 has been fitted with a millimeter wave camera and a radome to test the camera's generation of video images of the forward scene in low-visibility conditions. The aircraft, which in the VIP/Distinguished Visitor (DV) transport role seats 14 passengers, also gives a Joint Forces Air Component Commander (JFACC) a limited ability to plan and control the simulated battle while in the air en route to the crisis area.

==== Speckled Trout ====
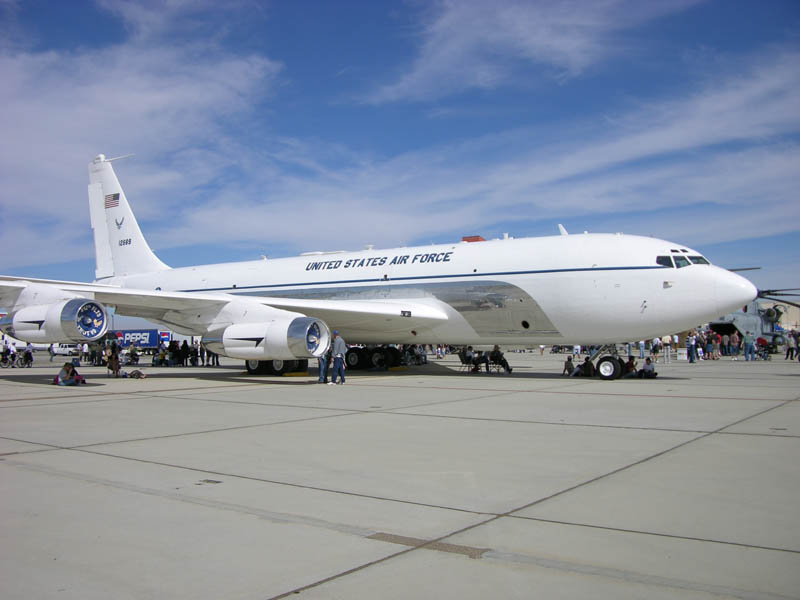
The C-135C Speckled Trout at Edwards Air Force Base

Speckled Trout is the official name of a combined SAF/CSAF support mission and concurrent test mission. It was also the official nickname given to a modified C-135C, serial number 61–2669, that was used by the Secretary and the Chief of Staff of the Air Force for executive transport requirements. Fully equipped with an array of communications equipment, data links and cryptographic sets, the aircraft served a secondary role as a testbed for proposed command and control systems and was also used to evaluate future transport aircraft design. The 412th Flight Test Squadron (412 FLTS) of the Air Force Materiel Command (AFMC) at Edwards AFB, California operated the C-135 Speckled Trout airframe and managed its test mission.

The name Speckled Trout applies to both the organization and the aircraft. The name was chosen in honor of an early program monitor, Faye Trout, who assisted in numerous phases of the project. Trout reportedly had many freckles, hence the addition of "Speckled."

Speckled Trout acquired the C-135C, serial number 61–2669, in 1974 and retired the aircraft on 13 January 2006. An interim aircraft was in use for the Speckled Trout mission until the 2008 delivery of the current aircraft, a modified KC-135R Stratotanker serial number 63–7980 with a more modern communications architecture testbed. The current KC-135R Speckled Trout also supports additional tests and air refueling requirements that the C-135C could not.

=== C-135F ===
C-135F (Boeing model number 717-165) was new-built variant for France as a dual-role tanker/cargo and troop carrier aircraft. 12 were built for the French Air Force with the addition of a drogue adapter on the refueling boom. 11 surviving C-135Fs upgraded to C-135FRs with CFM International F108 turbofans between 1985 and 1988. Later modified with MPRS wing pods.

=== C-135K ===
One former EC-135K modified for VIP use for CINCPAC.

== Accidents and incidents ==
- 23 October 1962: During the Cuban Missile Crisis, a USAF/MATS C-135B (serial number 62-4136) stalled and crashed on approach to Guantanamo Bay Naval Base, Cuba after a flight from McGuire Air Force Base, New Jersey. All seven crew members aboard were killed.
- 11 May 1964: A USAF/MATS C-135B, (serial number 61-0332), was on a Military Air Transport Service (MATS) flight from Fairfield-Travis AFB, CA (SUU) to Clark AB in the Philippines via Honolulu-Hickam AFB, HI (HIK). Thunderstorms were in the area as the flight approached Clark AB. An indefinite ceiling was at 300 feet and visibility was 2000 m. The crew carried out a Precision approach radar (PAR) approach to runway 02. The aircraft descended below the glidepath and the crew were urged to initiate go around as the C-135 had descended below the PAR lower safety limit. By then, the co-pilot had the runway in sight and the approach was continued. On final, the undercarriage struck the perimeter fence. The airplane struck a TACAN facility, hit the ground and slid across a road, striking a cab and killing the driver. The airplane broke up and caught fire. Five of the ten crewmembers and all 74 passengers were fatally injured, along with the unfortunate cab driver.
- 25 June 1965: A USAF/MATS C-135A, (serial number 60-0373), carrying 84 US Marine Corps personnel was flying from MCAS El Toro to Okinawa. Weather was poor at El Toro when the airplane was ready to depart: thick fog and light drizzle. Takeoff was accomplished at night at 01:45 from runway 34R. After takeoff, the pilot should have made a prescribed left turn. Instead, the airplane continued straight ahead. It contacted the 1,300-foot Loma Ridge, some 150 feet below the crest. The aircraft broke up and burst into flames. The crash killed all 12 crewmembers and 72 other personnel on board.

== Aircraft on display ==
- 60-0374 – The Bird of Prey Built as a C-135A, later converted to EC-135N, and later to EC-135E. Retired 2 November 2000. On display at National Museum of the US Air Force, Wright Patterson AFB, Ohio; nose art remains.
- 60-0377 – Built as a C-135A. Used as B-2 avionics flying testbed. To Edwards AFB museum, California in 1996; in museum storage.
- 61-0327 – Built as a C-135A, later converted to EC-135N, but with E-model engines installed. On display at Museum of Aviation (Warner Robins) at Robins, AFB, Georgia.
- 61-2669 – Built as a C-135B, later converted to WC-135B. Spent a few months at MASDC in 1972. Later used as a Speckled Trout research aircraft and redesignated C-135C. Also the personal transport of Chairman of the Joint Chiefs of Staff, General Henry Hugh Shelton, from 1997 to 2001. Made last flight 13 January 2006. Now with the Edwards AFB Museum, California; in museum storage.
- 61-2671 – Built as a C-135B, later converted to WC-135B. Involved in a landing accident in 1970, but was repaired. Later converted to C-135C executive transport. Now on display at Tinker AFB Air Park, Oklahoma.

== Specifications (C-135) ==
General characteristics

- Crew: 3: pilot, copilot, loadmaster (4 for non-PACER CRAG aircraft)
- Length: 136 ft 3 in (41.53 m)
- Wingspan: 130 ft 10 in (39.88 m)
- Height: 41 ft 8 in (12.70 m)
- Wing area: 2,433 sq ft (226 m^{2})
- Empty weight: 98,466 lb (44,663 kg) , empty operating weight 124,000 lb (56,200 kg)
- Gross weight: 297,000 lb (135,000 kg)
- Max takeoff weight: 322,500 lb (146,000 kg)
- Powerplant: 4 × 4 Pratt & Whitney TF-33-PW-102 low-bypass turbofan engines , 18,000 lbf (80 kN) thrust each

Performance

- Maximum speed: 580 mph (933 km/h, 500 kn)
- Range: 3,450 mi (5,550 km, 3,000 nmi)
- Service ceiling: 50,000 ft (15,200 m)
- Rate of climb: 4,900 ft/min (25 m/s) or 1,490 m/min

== See also ==
Related development

- Boeing KC-135 Stratotanker
- Boeing EC-135
- Boeing NC-135
- Boeing RC-135
- Boeing OC-135B Open Skies
- Boeing WC-135 Constant Phoenix
- Boeing C-137 Stratoliner
- Boeing 707
- Boeing 720
