= 24th Expeditionary Reconnaissance Squadron =

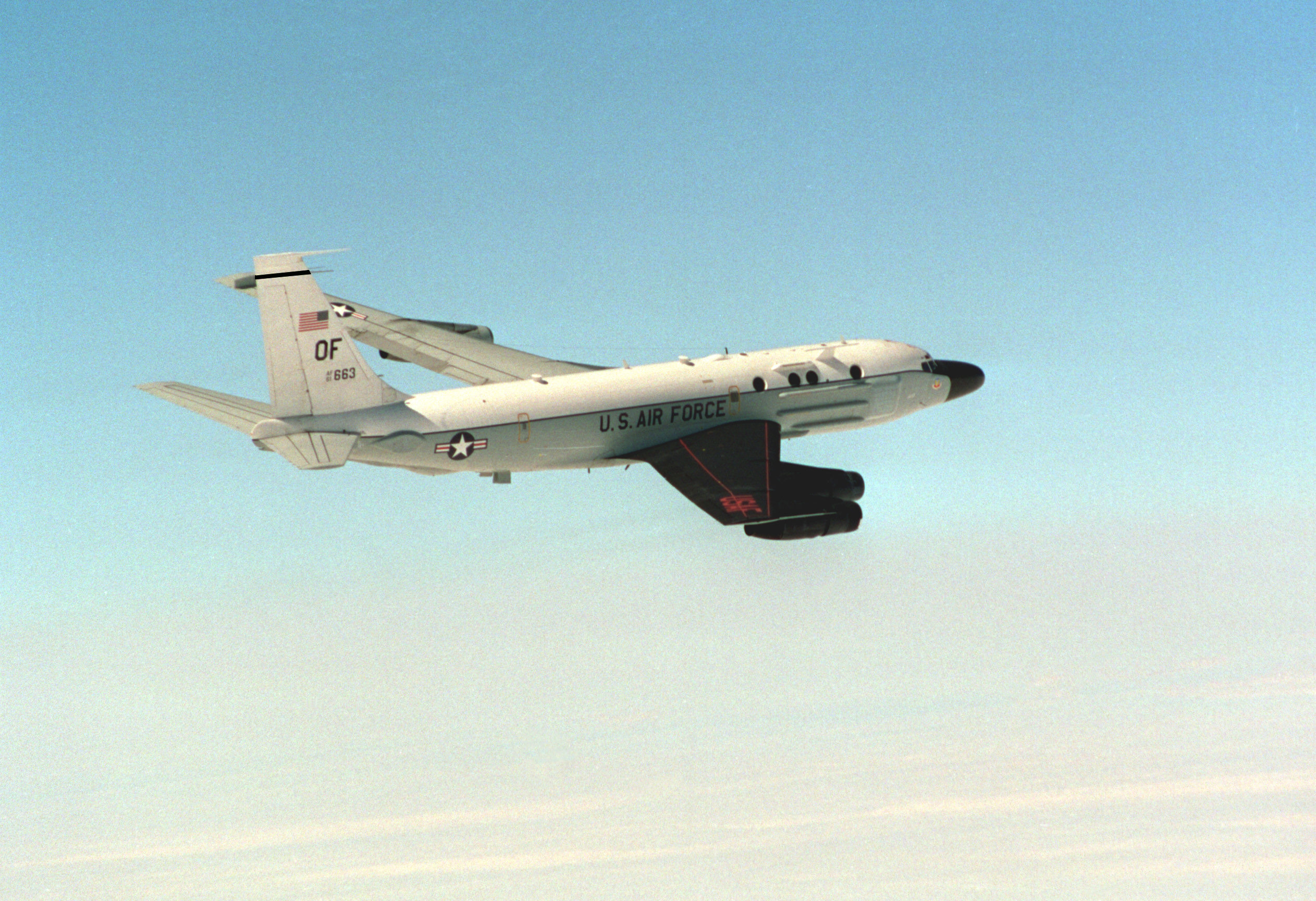
- RC-135S Cobra Ball in flight
- Active: 1942–1948; 1951–1967; 1967–1994
- Country: United States
- Branch: United States Air Force
- Role: Aerial reconnaissance
- Motto: We Observe the Unknown (post 1967)
- Decorations: Distinguished Unit Citation; Air Force Outstanding Unit Award

Insignia
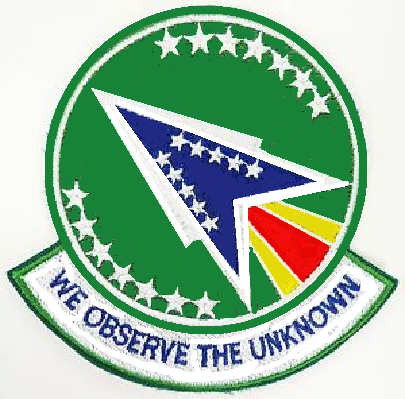
- 24th Strategic Reconnaissance Squadron emblem

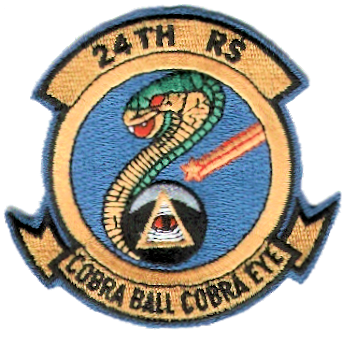
- Patch with 24th Reconnaissance Squadron Cobra Ball Logo

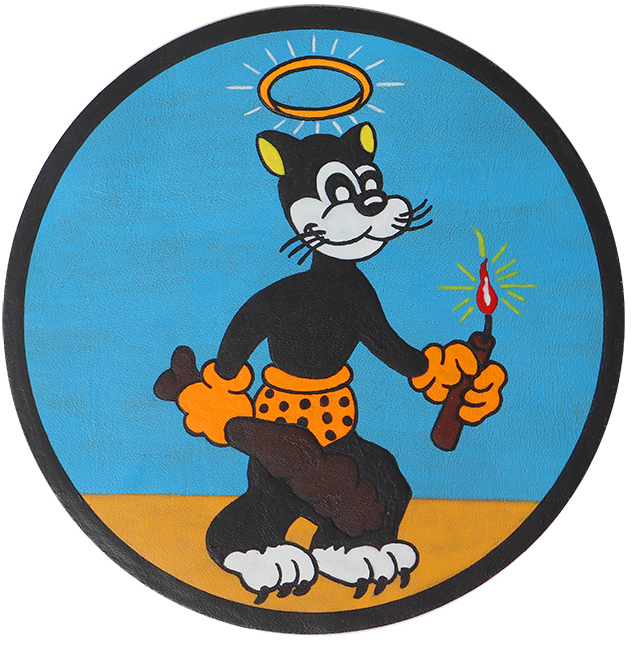
- 24th Bombardment Squadron emblem (approved 24 November 1944)

The 24th Expeditionary Reconnaissance Squadron is a provisional unit of the United States Air Force. It is assigned to United States Air Forces Europe to activate or inactivate as needed. Its last known attachment was to the 100th Air Refueling Wing, stationed at RAF Mildenhall, Suffolk, UK in 2007.

== History ==
=== B-29 Superfortress operations against Japan ===
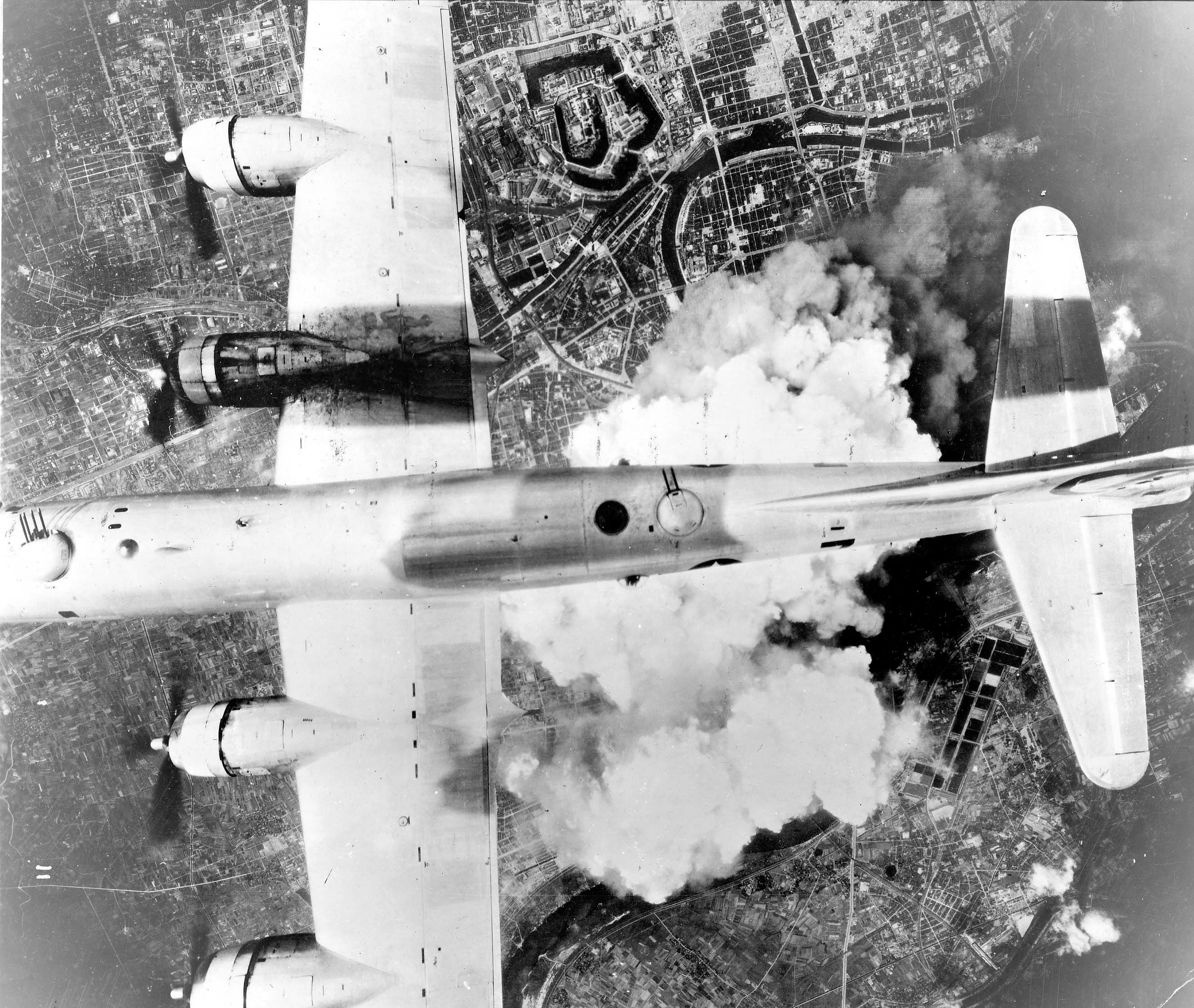
Squadron B-29 on a strike against Osaka (Note: Aircraft is Boeing B-29A-45-BN Superfortress, serial 44-61784, "Incendiary Journey'" on 1 June 1945.)

Constituted in the spring of 1944 as a very heavy bombardment squadron equipped with B-29 Superfortresses, the unit completed its training and was relocated to North Field on Tinian in the Mariana Islands of the Central Pacific Area in January 1945. There, it was assigned to the XXI Bomber Command of the Twentieth Air Force. Its primary mission was to conduct strategic bombardment campaigns against the Japanese Home Islands and to cripple Japan's war-making capabilities.

Initially, the squadron carried out "shakedown" missions targeting Japanese-held locations such as Moen Island, Truk, and other sites in the Carolines and Marianas. The combat phase began on 25 February 1945, with a firebombing raid over Northeast Tokyo. The squadron participated in extensive firebombing campaigns, but during the first ten days of relentless bombing, the Army Air Forces exhausted their supply of incendiary bombs. Until then, the squadron had been conducting conventional strategic bombing runs using high-explosive bombs.

Throughout the remainder of the war, the squadron continued urban area incendiary raids, inflicting massive destruction on Japanese cities. It also targeted strategic military objectives, including aircraft factories, chemical plants, and oil refineries. The squadron flew its final combat missions on August 14, 1945, coinciding with the end of hostilities. Following the cessation of fighting, its B-29s were used to deliver relief supplies to Allied prisoners of war in Japan and Manchuria.

After the war, the squadron remained stationed in the Western Pacific, assigned to the Twentieth Air Force on Okinawa. It was maintained as a strategic bombardment unit until late 1948, when it was inactivated due to budget reductions. Some of its aircraft were scrapped on Tinian, while others were flown to storage depots in the United States.

=== Strategic Air Command ===
Reactivated in 1951 and redesigned as a heavy bomb squadron, the unit was initially issued with B-29s for training. It was equipped with B-36 Peacemaker intercontinental strategic bombers in 1953 for operational use. It began with B-36Fs; the featherweight B-36J was added, the squadron operating both types. These aircraft carried a yellow stripe on the tip of the vertical stabilizer, the lip of the jet intakes and the "nose cone" of the jet itself along with an 'R' inside a triangle as a tail code. SAC (Strategic Air Command), eliminated tail codes in 1953. In 1957 the B-36s were replaced by B-52E Stratofortresses and all squadron markings were eliminated. The squadron remained equipped with the B-52s until the closure of Walker AFB in 1967.

It was re-equipped with RC-135 Cobra Ball/Cobra Eye aircraft to support theater and national level intelligence consumers with near real-time on-scene collection, analysis and dissemination capabilities. The squadron was inactivated as part of the post Cold War drawdown in 1994 and replaced by the 45th Reconnaissance Squadron.

=== Operations and decorations ===
- Combat Operations: Combat in Western Pacific, 27 Jan-14 Aug 1945.
- Campaigns: World War II: Eastern Mandates; Western Pacific; Air Offensive, Japan.
- Decorations: Distinguished Unit Citations: Tokyo, Japan, 25 May 1945; Japanese Empire, 9–19 Jul 1945. Air Force Outstanding Unit Award: 1 May 1960 – 31 May 1962.

== Lineage ==
24th Bombardment Squadron

- Constituted as the 24th Bombardment Squadron, Very Heavy on 28 March 1944

Activated on 1 April 1944
Inactivated on 18 October 1948

- Redesignated the 24th Bombardment Squadron, Medium on 20 December 1950

Activated on 2 January 1951
Redesignated the 24th Bombardment Squadron, Heavy on 16 June 1952
Inactivated and discontinued on 25 January 1967

- Consolidated with the 24th Strategic Reconnaissance Squadron on 19 September 1985 as the 24th Strategic Reconnaissance Squadron

24th Strategic Reconnaissance Squadron

- Constituted as 24th Strategic Reconnaissance Squadron on 20 December 1966

Activated on 25 March 1967

- Consolidated with the 24th Bombardment Squadron, Medium on 19 September 1985

Redesignated as 24th Reconnaissance Squadron on 7 July 1992
Inactivated on 30 June 1994

- Redesignated 24th Expeditionary Reconnaissance Squadron on 2 July 2007

Activated on 4 August 2007

=== Assignments ===
- 6th Bombardment Group, 1 April 1944 – 18 October 1948; 2 January 1951
- 6th Bombardment Wing(later Strategic Aerospace Wing), 16 June 1952 – 25 January 1967
- 6th Strategic Wing (later 6th Strategic Reconnaissance Wing) 25 March 1967
- 55th Operations Group, 7 July 1992 – 30 June 1994
- United States Air Forces Europe, 2 July 2007 to activate or inactivate as needed

401st Air Expeditionary Group 4 August 2007
100th Air Refueling Wing: attached 16 August 2007 – unknown

=== Stations ===
- Dalhart Army Air Field, Texas, 1 April 1944
- Grand Island Army Air Field, Nebraska, 26 May – 18 November 1944
- North Field, Tinian, 28 December 1944
- Clark Field, Luzon, Philippines, 13 March 1946
- Kadena AB, Okinawa, 1 June 1947 – 18 October 1948
- Walker AFB, New Mexico, 2 January 1951 – 25 January 1967
- Eielson AFB, Alaska 25 March 1967
- Offutt AFB, Nebraska, 7 July 1992 – 30 June 1994
- RAF Mildenhall, England, 4 August 2007 –

=== Aircraft ===
- B-17 Flying Fortress, 1944
- B-29 Superfortress, 1944–1947, 1951–1952
- RB-36 Peacemaker, 1953–1957
- B-52 Stratofortress, 1957–1967
- RC-135S COBRA BALL, 1967–1992
- RC-135V/W RIVET JOINT, 1994-Present

== See also ==
- List of B-52 Units of the United States Air Force
