= Boeing RC-135 =

Reconnaissance aircraft series by Boeing

RC-135
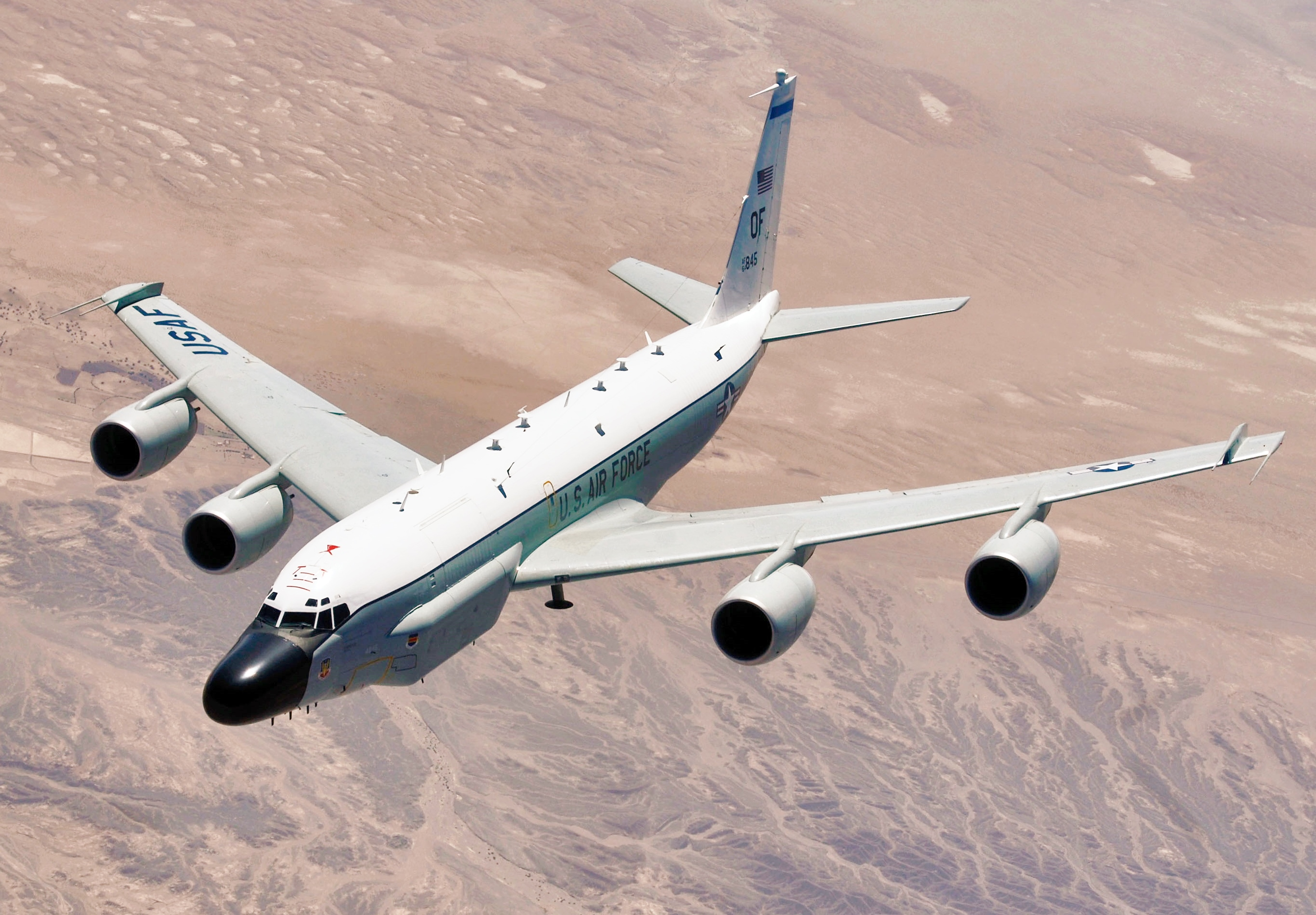
- An RC-135 Rivet Joint reconnaissance aircraft in flight.

General information
- Type: Reconnaissance aircraft
- Manufacturer: Boeing (airframe); L3Harris Technologies
- Status: In service
- Primary users: United States Air Force Royal Air Force
- Number built: 32 total airframes across all iterations

History
- Introduction date: 1961
- Developed from: Boeing C-135 Stratolifter

The Boeing RC-135 is a family of large reconnaissance aircraft built by Boeing and modified by a number of companies, including General Dynamics, Lockheed, LTV, E-Systems, and L3Harris Technologies, and used by the United States Air Force and Royal Air Force to produce theater and national level intelligence with near real-time on-scene collection, analysis and dissemination capabilities.

Based on the Boeing C-135 Stratolifter airframe, various types of RC-135s have been in service since 1961. Unlike the KC-135, which is recognized by Boeing as the Model 717, most of the current RC-135 fleet, with the exception of the RAF's RC-135Ws, is internally designated as the Model 739 by the company. Many variants have been modified numerous times, resulting in a large variety of designations, configurations, and program names.

== Design and development ==
In 1962, the first RC-135 variant, the RC-135A, was ordered by the United States Air Force to replace the Boeing RB-50 Superfortress. Originally nine were ordered but this was later reduced to four. Boeing allocated the variant the designation Boeing 739-700 but they were a modified variant of the KC-135A then in production. They used the same Pratt & Whitney J57 turbojet engines as the tanker and carried cameras in a bay just aft of the nose wheel well where the forward fuel tank was normally located. They had no in-flight refueling system and they were used for photographic and surveying tasks. Although the RC-135A was the first designation in the RC-135 family, it was not the first RC-135 in service. That distinction belongs to the RC-135S, which began operational reconnaissance missions in 1961, followed by the RC-135D in 1962.

The next variant ordered was the RC-135B, to be used as an electronic intelligence aircraft to replace the Boeing RB-47H Stratojet, a SIGINT platform. Unlike the earlier variants, the RC-135Bs had Pratt & Whitney TF33 turbofans rather than the older J57s. These ten aircraft were delivered directly to Martin Aircraft beginning in 1965 for installation of their operational electronics suite. By 1967, they emerged as RC-135Cs and all entered service that year. The refueling boom was not fitted and the boom operator station was used as a camera bay for a KA-59 camera. Externally, the aircraft were distinguished by the large cheek antenna fairings on the forward fuselage.

The RC-135Bs were the last of the new aircraft built. All further reconnaissance variants that followed were modified aircraft, either from earlier RC-135 variants or from tankers and transports.

In 2005, the RC-135 fleet completed a series of significant airframe, navigation and powerplant upgrades, which include re-engining from the TF33 to the CFM International CFM-56 (F108) engines used on the KC-135R and T Stratotanker, and an upgrade of the flight deck instrumentation and navigation systems to the Avionics Modernization Program (AMP) standard. The AMP standard includes conversion from analog readouts to a digital glass cockpit configuration.

== Operational history ==
The current RC-135 fleet is the latest iteration of modifications to this pool of aircraft dating back to the early 1960s. Initially employed by Strategic Air Command for reconnaissance, the RC-135 fleet has participated in every armed conflict involving U.S. forces during its tenure. RC-135s supported operations in Vietnam War, the Mediterranean for Operation El Dorado Canyon, Grenada for Operation Urgent Fury, Panama for Operation Just Cause, the Balkans for Operations Deliberate Force and Allied Force, and Southwest Asia for Operations Desert Shield, Desert Storm, Enduring Freedom and Iraqi Freedom. RC-135s have maintained a constant presence in Southwest Asia since the early 1990s. They were stalwarts of Cold War operations, with missions flown around the periphery of the USSR and its client states in Europe and around the world.

Originally, all RC-135s were operated by Strategic Air Command. Since 1992, they have been assigned to Air Combat Command. The RC-135 fleet is permanently based at Offutt Air Force Base, Nebraska and operated by the 55th Wing, using forward operating locations worldwide.

On 9 August 2010, the Rivet Joint program recognized its 20th anniversary of continuous service in Central Command, dating back to the beginning of Desert Shield. This represents the longest unbroken presence of any aircraft in the Air Force inventory. During this time it has flown over 8,000 combat missions supporting air and ground forces of Operations Desert Storm, Desert Shield, Northern Watch, Southern Watch, Iraqi Freedom and Enduring Freedom.

In March 2010 the British Ministry of Defence announced that it reached an agreement with the US Government to purchase three RC-135W Rivet Joint aircraft to replace the Nimrod R1, which was retired in June 2011. The aircraft, to be styled as 'Airseeker', were scheduled to be delivered by 2017 at a total cost of around £650 million, including provision of ground infrastructure, training of personnel and ground supporting systems. In 2013, the UK government confirmed that crews from the RAF's 51 Squadron had been training and operating alongside their USAF colleagues since 2011, having achieved in excess of 32,000 flying hours and 1,800 sorties as part of the 55th Wing at Offutt AFB.

The RAF received the first RC-135W in September 2013, which was deployed from July 2014 to support coalition action against the Islamic State of Iraq and the Levant militants in Iraq. The second aircraft was delivered seven months ahead of schedule in September 2015, with over sixty improvements incorporated ranging from upgrades to the aircraft's mission systems to engine improvements providing increased fuel efficiency and durability. In due course, the first aircraft will receive the same upgrades. The aircraft can only be air-to-air refuelled in service by USAF tankers based in Europe, since the UK does not operate boom-equipped refueling aircraft, and has no plans to adapt drogue-equipped aircraft.

U.S. Air Force and Royal Air Force RC-135W Rivet Joint reconnaissance aircraft were deployed numerous times to conduct reconnaissance missions around Poland and the Russian exclave of Kaliningrad during the 2022 Russian Invasion of Ukraine. Stated objectives include broadcasting a clear signal that the US, and thus NATO, is aware of Russian movements in the area of operations.

== Variants ==
=== KC-135A Reconnaissance Platforms ===
At least four KC-135A tankers were converted into makeshift reconnaissance platforms with no change of Mission Design Series (MDS) designation. KC-135As 55–3121, 55–3127, 59–1465, and 59-1514 were modified beginning in 1961. That year the Soviet Union announced its intention to detonate a 100 megaton thermonuclear device on Novaya Zemlya, the so-called Tsar Bomba. A testbed KC-135A (55–3127) was modified under the Big Safari program to the SPEED LIGHT BRAVO configuration in order to obtain intelligence information on the test. The success of the mission prompted conversion of additional aircraft for intelligence gathering duties.

=== KC-135R Rivet Stand / Rivet Quick ===
Not to be confused with the CFM F108-powered KC-135R tanker, the KC-135R MDS was applied in 1963 to the three KC-135A reconnaissance aircraft under the Rivet Stand program. The three aircraft were 55–3121, 59–1465, and 59–1514. A fourth, serial no. 58–0126, was converted in 1969 to replace 1465, which crashed in 1967. Externally the aircraft had varied configurations throughout their careers, but generally they were distinguished by five "towel bar" antennas along the spine of the upper fuselage and a radome below the forward fuselage.

The first three aircraft retained the standard tanker nose radome, while 58-0126 was fitted with the 'hog nose' radome commonly associated with an RC-135. A trapeze-like structure in place of the refueling boom which was used to trail an aerodynamic shape housing a specialized receiver array, colloquially known as a "blivet", on a wire was installed. This was reported to be used for "Briar Patch" and "Combat Lion" missions. There were four small optically flat windows on each side of the forward fuselage.

On some missions, a small wing-like structure housing sensors was fitted to each side of the forward fuselage, with a diagonal brace below it. With the loss of 59–1465, KC-135A 58-0126 was modified to this standard under the Rivet Quick operational name. All four aircraft were lost in accidents or converted to KC-135R tanker configurations. They are among the few KC-135 tankers equipped with an aerial refueling receptacle above the cockpit, a remnant of their service as intelligence gathering platforms.

=== KC-135T Cobra Jaw ===
In 1969, KC-135R 55-3121 was modified by Lockheed Air Services to the unique KC-135T configuration, under the Cobra Jaw program name. Externally distinguished by the 'hog nose' radome, the aircraft featured spinning "fang" receiver antennas below the nose radome, a large blade antenna above the forward fuselage, a single 'towel bar' antenna on the spine, teardrop antennas forward of the horizontal stabilizers on each side, and the trapeze-like structure in place of the refueling boom. The aircraft briefly carried nose art consisting of the Ford Cobra Jet cartoon cobra. It was later modified into an RC-135T Rivet Dandy.

=== RC-135A ===
Four RC-135As (63–8058 to 8061) were photo mapping platforms used briefly by the Air Photographic & Charting Service, based at Turner Air Force Base, Georgia and later at Forbes Air Force Base, Kansas as part of the 1370th Photographic Mapping Wing. The mission was soon assumed by satellites, and the RC-135As were de-modified and used in various other roles, such as staff transport and crew training.

In the early 1980s they were converted to tankers, with the designation KC-135D, of the same basic configuration as the KC-135A and later E, plus some remaining special mission equipment. Due to delays in reinstalling their original equipment, the RC-135As were the last of the entire C-135 series delivered to the USAF. The Boeing model number for the RC-135A is 739–700.

=== RC-135B ===
The as-delivered version of the RC-135. The RC-135B was never used operationally, as it had no mission equipment installed by Boeing. The entire RC-135B production run of ten aircraft was delivered directly to Martin Aircraft in Baltimore, Maryland for modification and installation of mission equipment under the Big Safari program. Upon completion, the RC-135Bs were re-designated RC-135C. The Boeing model number for the RC-135B is 739-445B.

=== RC-135C Big Team ===
Modified and re-designated RC-135B aircraft used for strategic reconnaissance duties, equipped with the AN/ASD-1 electronic intelligence (ELINT) system. This system was characterized by the large 'cheek' pods on the forward fuselage containing the Automated ELINT Emitter Locating System (AEELS – not Side Looking Airborne Radar – SLAR, as often quoted), as well as numerous other antennae and a camera position in the refuelling pod area of the aft fuselage. The aircraft was crewed by two pilots, two navigators, numerous intelligence gathering specialists, inflight maintenance technicians and airborne linguists. When the RC-135C was fully deployed, SAC was able to retire its fleet of RB-47H Stratojets from active reconnaissance duties. All ten continue in active service as either RC-135V Rivet Joint or RC-135U Combat Sent platforms.

=== RC-135D Office Boy / Rivet Brass ===
The RC-135Ds, originally designated KC-135A-II, were the first reconnaissance configured C-135s given the "R" MDS prefix designation, although they were not the first reconnaissance-tasked members of the C-135 family. In 1962, they were delivered to Eielson Air Force Base, Alaska as part of the Office Boy Project. Serial numbers were 60–0356, 60–0357, and 60–0362. In 1963, the aircraft began operational missions. These three aircraft were ordered as KC-135A tankers, but delivered without refueling booms, and known as "falsie C-135As" pending the delivery of the first actual C-135A cargo aircraft in 1961.

The primary Rivet Brass mission flew along the northern border of the Soviet Union, often as a shuttle mission between Eielson and RAF Upper Heyford, Oxfordshire, and later RAF Mildenhall, Suffolk, UK. The RC-135D was also used in Southeast Asia during periods when the RC-135M (see below) was unavailable. In the late 1970s, with the expansion of the RC-135 fleet powered by TF33 turbofan engines, the RC-135Ds were converted into tankers, and remain in service as receiver-capable KC-135Rs.

=== RC-135E Lisa Ann / Rivet Amber ===
Originally designated C-135B-II, project name Lisa Ann, the RC-135E Rivet Amber was a one-of-a-kind aircraft, equipped with a large 7 MW Hughes Aircraft phased-array radar system. Originally delivered as a C-135B, 62-4137 operated from Shemya Air Force Station, Alaska from 1966 to 1969. Its operations were performed in concert with the RC-135S Rivet Ball aircraft (see below). The radar system alone weighed over 35,000 pounds and cost over US$35 million (1960 dollars), making Rivet Amber both the heaviest C-135 derivative aircraft flying and the most expensive Air Force aircraft for its time. This prevented the forward and aft crew areas from having direct contact after boarding the aircraft.

The system could track an object the size of a soccer ball from a distance of 300 miles (480 km). Its mission was to monitor Soviet ballistic missile testing in the reentry phase. The power requirement for the phased array radar was enormous, necessitating an additional power supply. This took the form of a podded Lycoming T55-L5 turboshaft engine in a pod under the left inboard wing section, driving a 350 kVA generator, dedicated to powering mission equipment.

On the opposite wing, in the same location, was a podded heat exchanger to permit cooling of the massive electronic components on board the aircraft. This configuration has led to the mistaken impression that the aircraft had six engines. On 5 June 1969, Rivet Amber was lost at sea on a ferry flight from Shemya to Eielson AFB for maintenance. No trace of the aircraft or its crew was ever found.

=== RC-135M Rivet Card ===
The RC-135M was an interim type, with more limited ELINT capability than the RC-135C, but with extensive additional COMINT capability. They were converted from Military Airlift Command C-135B transports, and operated by the 82d Reconnaissance Squadron during the Vietnam War from Kadena Air Base, gathering signals intelligence over the Gulf of Tonkin and Laos with the program name Combat Apple, originally Burning Candy. There were six RC-135M aircraft, 62–4131, 62–4132, 62–4134, 62–4135, 62–4138 and 62–4139. All were later modified to and continue in active service as RC-135W Rivet Joints by the early 1980s.

=== RC-135S Nancy Rae / Wanda Belle / Rivet Ball ===
Rivet Ball was the predecessor program to Cobra Ball and was initiated with a single RC-135S (serial 59–1491, formerly a JKC-135A) on 31 December 1961. The aircraft first operated under the Nancy Rae project as an asset of Air Force Systems Command, and later as an RC-135S reconnaissance platform with Strategic Air Command under project Wanda Belle. The name Rivet Ball was assigned in January 1967. The aircraft operated from Shemya AFB, Alaska. Along with most other RC-135 variants, the RC-135S had an elongated nose radome, housing an S band receiving antenna.

The aircraft had ten large optically flat quartz windows for tracking cameras on the right side of the fuselage. Unlike any other RC-135S, Rivet Ball had a plexiglass dome mounted top-center on its fuselage for the Manual Tracker position. It obtained the first photographic documentation of Soviet Multiple Reentry vehicle (MRV) testing on 4 October 1968. On 13 January 1969, Rivet Ball was destroyed when it overran the runway when landing at Shemya, with no fatalities.

=== RC-135S Cobra Ball ===
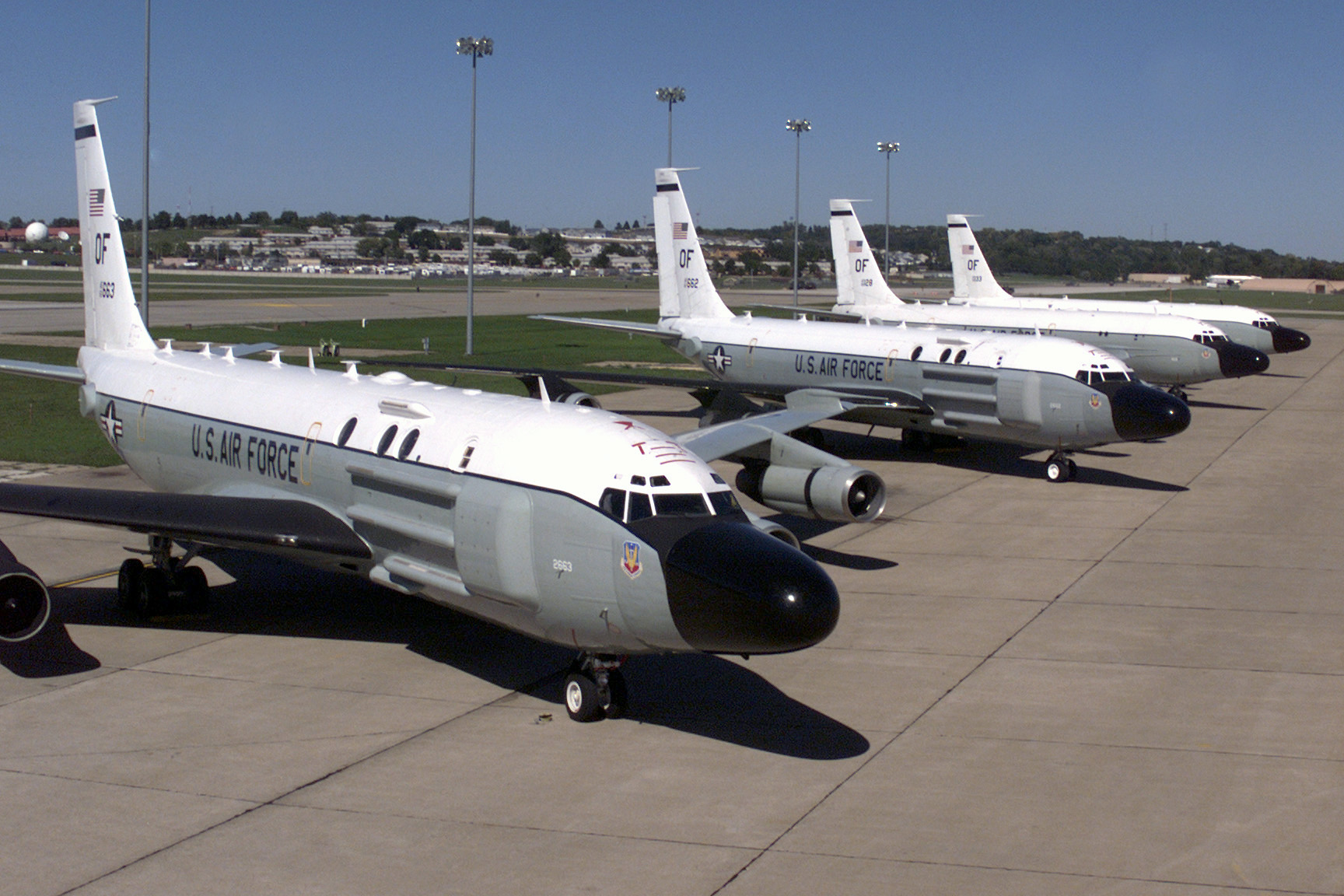
All three Cobra Ball aircraft on the flightline at Offutt AFB, Nebraska, 2001, together with the sole TC-135S

The RC-135S Cobra Ball is a measurement and signature intelligence (MASINT) collector equipped with special electro-optical instruments such an All Weather Tracking Radar and Medium Wave Infrared Array (MIRA) designed to observe ballistic missile flights at long range. The Cobra Ball monitors missile-associated signals and tracks missiles during boost and re-entry phases to provide reconnaissance for treaty verification and theater ballistic missile proliferation. The aircraft are extensively modified C-135Bs. The right wing and engines are traditionally painted black to reduce sun glare for tracking cameras.

There are three aircraft in service, assigned to the 55th Wing, 45th Reconnaissance Squadron based at Offutt Air Force Base, Nebraska. Cobra Ball aircraft were originally assigned to Shemya and used to observe ballistic missile tests on the Kamchatka peninsula in conjunction with Cobra Dane and Cobra Judy. In 1969, two aircraft were converted for Cobra Ball. Following the loss of an aircraft in 1981, another aircraft was converted in 1983. In 1995, the sole RC-135X was converted into an RC-135S to supplement the other aircraft.

=== RC-135T Rivet Dandy ===
In 1971, KC-135T 55-3121 was modified to a RC-135T Rivet Dandy configuration. It was used to supplement the RC-135C/D/M fleet, then in short supply due to ongoing upgrades requiring airframes to be out of service. It operated under the Burning Candy operational order. In 1973, the aircraft's SIGINT gear was removed and transferred to KC-135R 58–0126, resulting in 55-3121 assuming the role of trainer, a role which it fulfilled for the remainder of its operational existence. Externally the aircraft retained the 'hog nose' radome and some other external modifications. The aerial refueling boom and trapeze below the tail were removed, and it had no operational reconnaissance role.

In this configuration, it operated variously with the 376th Strategic Wing at Kadena Air Base, Okinawa, the 305th AREFW at Grissom AFB, Indiana, and the 6th Strategic Wing at Eielson AFB, Alaska. In 1982, the aircraft was modified with Pratt & Whitney TF33-PW102 engines and other modifications common to the KC-135E tanker program, and returned to Eielson AFB. It crashed while on approach to Valdez Airport, Alaska on 25 February 1985 with the loss of three crew members. The wreckage was found in August 1985, six months after the accident.

=== RC-135U Combat Sent ===
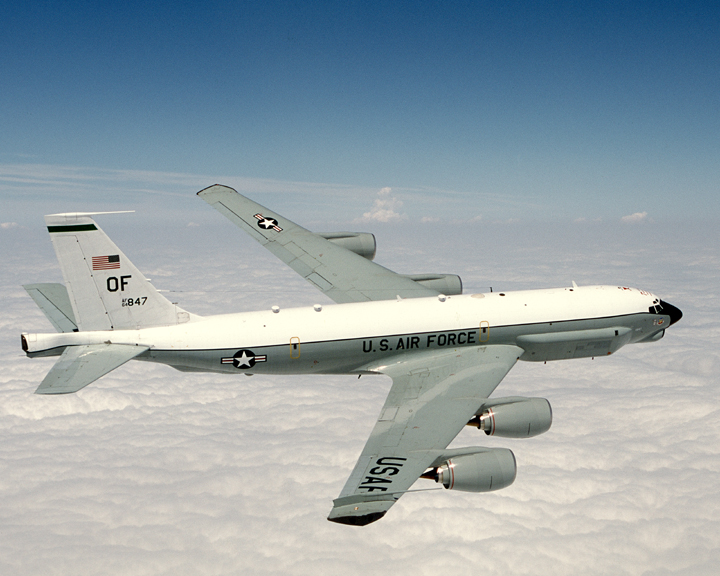
A Combat Sent aircraft in flight with its unique nose cone, wingtips, and tail

The RC-135U Combat Sent is designed to collect technical intelligence on adversary radar emitter systems. Combat Sent data is collected to develop new or upgraded radar warning receivers, radar jammers, decoys, anti-radiation missiles, and training simulators. Distinctly identified by the antenna arrays on the fuselage chin, tailcone, and wing tips, three RC-135C aircraft were converted to RC-135U (63–9792, 64–14847, & 64–14849) in the early 1970s. In 1978, 63-9792 was converted into a Rivet Joint. All aircraft remain in service based at Offutt Air Force Base, Nebraska. Minimum crew requirements are 2 pilots, 2 navigators, 3 systems engineers, 10 electronic warfare officers, and 6 area specialists.

=== RC-135V/W Rivet Joint ===
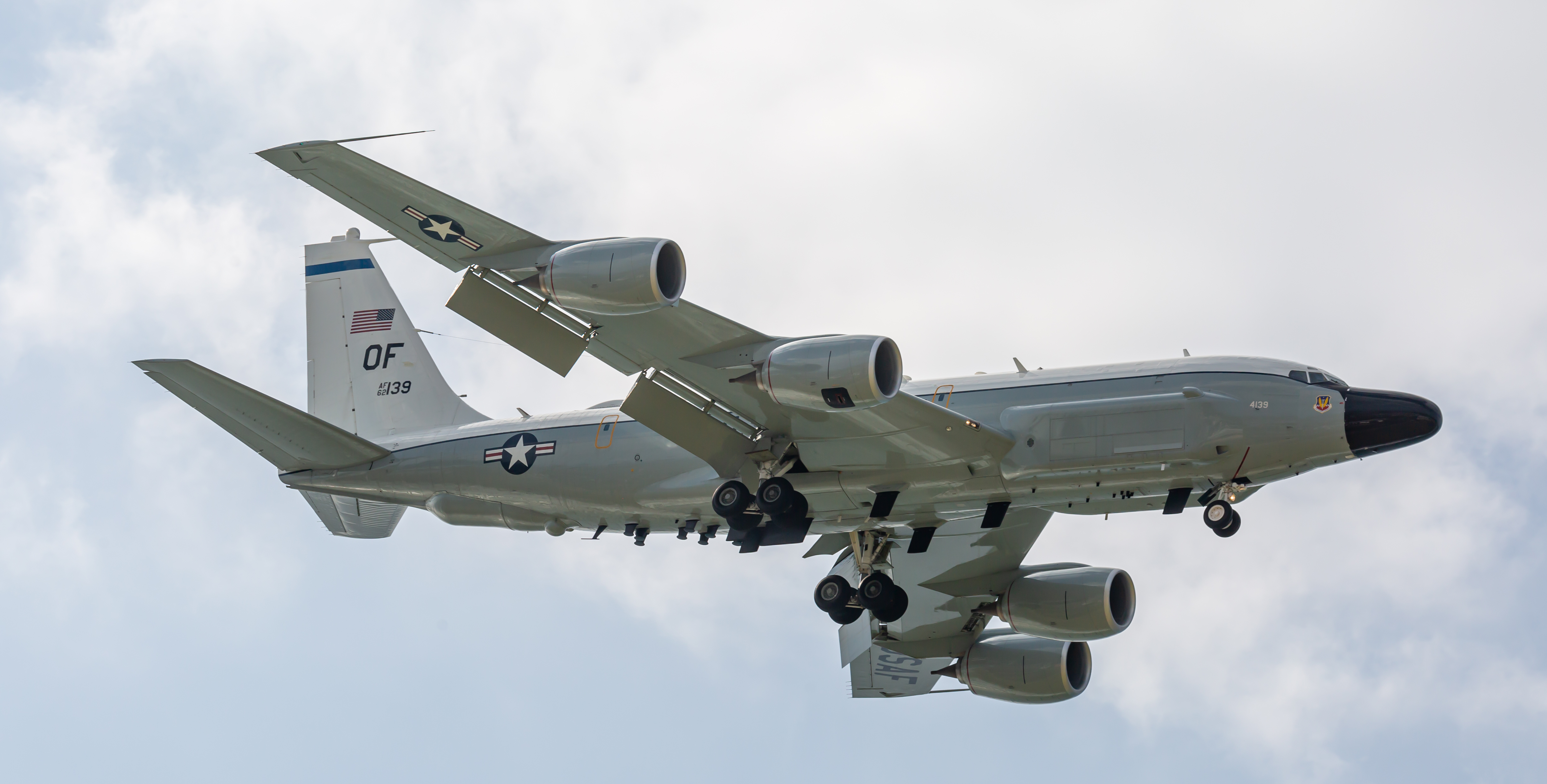
An RC-135V Rivet Joint on final approach at Kadena Air Base

The RC-135V/W is the USAF's standard airborne SIGINT platform. Missions flown by the RC-135s are designated either Burning Wind or Misty Wind. Its sensor suite allows the mission crew to detect, identify and geolocate signals throughout the electromagnetic spectrum. The mission crew can then forward gathered information in a variety of formats to a wide range of consumers via Rivet Joint's extensive communications suite. The crew consists of the cockpit crew, electronic warfare officers, intelligence operators, and airborne systems maintenance personnel. All Rivet Joint airframe and mission systems modifications are performed by L-3 Communications in Greenville, Texas, under the oversight of the Air Force Materiel Command.

All RC-135s are assigned to the 55th Wing, Air Combat Command at Offutt Air Force Base, Nebraska. The wing uses various forward deployment locations worldwide. They have flown from Eielson AFB, Alaska; Howard AB, Panama; Hellenikon Air Base, Greece; Kadena Air Base, Okinawa, Japan; and RAF Mildenhall, Suffolk, and RAF Upper Heyford, Oxfordshire, in the United Kingdom.

For many years, the RC-135V/W could be identified by the four large disc-capped Multiple Communications Emitter Location System (MUCELS) antennas forward, four somewhat smaller blade antennae aft and myriad of smaller underside antennas. Baseline 8 Rivet Joints, in the 2000s, introduced the first major change to the external RC-135V/W configuration, replacing the MUCELS antennas with plain blade antennas. The configuration of smaller underside antennas was also changed significantly.

==== RC-135W Rivet Joint (Project Airseeker) ====
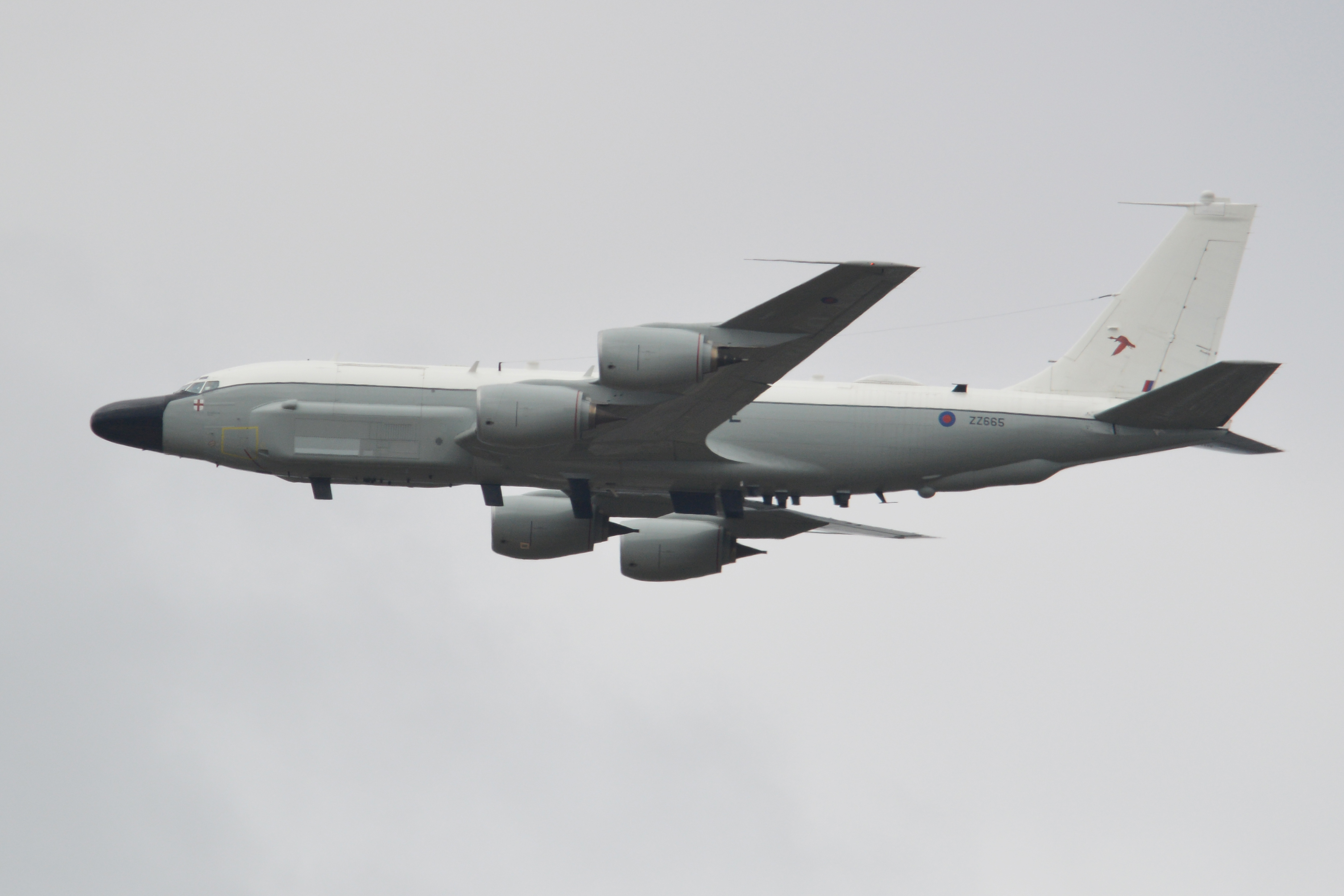
A British RC-135W, 2018

The United Kingdom bought three KC-135R aircraft for conversion to RC-135W Rivet Joint standard under the Airseeker project. Acquisition of the three aircraft was budgeted at £634m, with entry into service in October 2014. The aircraft formed No. 51 Squadron RAF, based at RAF Waddington along with the RAF's other ISTAR assets. They are expected to remain in service until 2045.

Previously, the Royal Air Force had gathered signals intelligence with three Nimrod R1 aircraft. When the time came to upgrade the maritime Nimrods to MRA4 standard, Project Helix was launched in August 2003 to study options for extending the life of the R1 to 2025. In 2008, the option of switching to Rivet Joint was added to Helix, and the retirement of the R1 became inevitable when the MRA4 was cancelled under the UK's 2010 defence review. The R1's involvement over Libya in Operation Ellamy delayed its retirement until June 2011.

Helix became Project Airseeker, under which three KC-135R airframes were converted to the RC-135W standard by L-3 Communications. L-3 provides ongoing maintenance and upgrades under a long-term agreement. The three airframes are former United States Air Force KC-135Rs, all of which first flew in 1964 and were modified to the latest RC-135W standard before delivery. These three airframes were the youngest KC-135s in the USAF fleet. As of September 2010 the aircraft had approximately 23,200 flying hours, 22,200 hours and 23,200 hours.

In January 2011, 51 Sqn personnel began training at Offutt for conversion to the RC-135. The first RC-135W (ZZ664) was delivered ahead of schedule to the Royal Air Force on 12 November 2013, for final approval and testing by the Defence Equipment and Support team prior to its release to service from the UK MAA. The second (ZZ665) was delivered in September 2015 and the third (ZZ666) in June 2017. The latter entered operational service in December 2017.

=== RC-135X Cobra Eye ===
The sole RC-135X Cobra Eye was converted during the mid-to-late-1980s from a C-135B Telemetry/Range Instrumented Aircraft, serial number 62–4128, with the mission of tracking ICBM reentry vehicles. In 1993, it was converted into an additional RC-135S Cobra Ball.

=== TC-135 ===
Three aircraft are in service for crew training, and lack fully functional mission equipment. One TC-135S (62–4133) provides training capability for the Cobra Ball mission, and is distinguishable from combat-ready aircraft by the lack of cheeks on the forward fuselage. It was converted from an EC-135B in 1985 following the crash of the former RC-135T 55–3121, which had been used as a trainer up to that point. Two TC-135Ws (62-4127 and 4129) serve as training aircraft, primarily for the Rivet Joint mission, but can provide some training capability for RC-135U Combat Sent crews. They carry considerably fewer antennas than the fully equipped aircraft, but are otherwise similar in appearance to other Rivet Joint aircraft.

== Operators ==
United States

United States Air Force

- Air Combat Command
  - 55th Wing – Offutt AFB, Nebraska
    - 55th Operations Group Detachment 1 (Elmendorf AFB, Alaska)
    - 38th Reconnaissance Squadron
    - 45th Reconnaissance Squadron
    - 82d Reconnaissance Squadron (Kadena Air Base, Japan)
    - 95th Reconnaissance Squadron (RAF Mildenhall, England)
      - 95th Reconnaissance Squadron Detachment 1 (NSA Souda Bay, Greece)
    - 338th Combat Training Squadron
    - 343d Reconnaissance Squadron
- Air National Guard
  - 170th Group – Offutt AFB, Nebraska
    - 238th Reconnaissance Squadron

United Kingdom

Royal Air Force

- No. 1 Group – RAF Waddington, Lincolnshire, England

No. 51 Squadron
No. 54 Squadron (Operational Conversion Unit(OCU))
No. 56 Squadron (Test and Evaluation)

== Accidents and incidents ==
- On 17 July 1967, a KC-135R Rivet Stand, 59-1465, crashed on takeoff from Offutt Air Force Base, Nebraska. The aircraft commander over-rotated the aircraft, causing it to stall and crash just under a mile from the end of the runway on the edge of Papillion Creek. One of the five crew members aboard was killed.
- On 13 January 1969, USAF RC-135S, 59-1491, called "Rivet Ball", was returning from an operational reconnaissance mission, when it landed at Shemya Air Force Base, Alaska in a snowstorm. The aircraft slid off the ice-covered runway and plunged into a 40-foot ravine. Later "Ball" aircraft were equipped with thrust-reversers on their TF-33 turbofan engines, but this aircraft had J-57 turbojet engines without reverse thrust capability. All eighteen crew members successfully evacuated the aircraft. The aircraft was written off as damaged beyond repair, but many components specific to the reconnaissance mission were salvaged for later use.
- On 5 June 1969, USAF RC-135E, 62-4137, called "Rivet Amber", departed Shemya Air Force Base, Alaska for a ferry flight to Eielson Air Force Base. Although the purpose of this ferry flight is sometimes described as routine maintenance, the aircraft had encountered severe turbulence on its previous operational mission and had been cleared for a one-time flight to be checked for possible structural damage at the main operating base. "Rivet Amber" was the heaviest 135 series aircraft ever built. It was a highly sophisticated aircraft with a radar that weighed over 35,000 pounds. Under each wing were specialized pods housing a heat-exchanger (right wing) and an additional electrical generator (left wing). During the flight, all contact with 62-4137 was lost and the wreckage of the aircraft nor any of the 19 crew on board were found.
- On 15 March 1981, USAF RC-135S, 61-2664, called "Cobra Ball", crashed on final approach in bad weather to Shemya Air Force Base, Alaska on a flight from Eielson Air Force Base, Alaska. The aircraft commander never established a proper glide path or descent rate on final and impacted the ground short of the runway. Of the twenty-four occupants of the aircraft, six were killed.
- On 25 February 1985, USAF RC-135T, 55-3121, operating out of Eielson AFB, Alaska, was flying practice approaches in very poor weather at the Valdez Municipal Airport, Alaska. This one-time "Speed Light" aircraft had been re-engined with P&W TF-33 engines, but was at this time only used for proficiency training in landings and air refueling, not for operational reconnaissance missions, but was sometimes called "Rivet Dandy". The first two approaches were uneventful, but the crew apparently became disoriented and the third Microwave Landing System (MLS) approach was commenced some four miles (6.4 km) north of the prescribed MLS inbound course. The crew of three, two pilots and a navigator, were killed when the aircraft flew into the side of a mountain. The approach procedure being attempted was certified for a de Havilland Canada DHC-7, STOL airplane. Both the glide slope and missed approach flight path were too steep for an RC-135 aircraft. The wreckage was located on 2 August 1985.
- On 3 March 2003, two MiG-29 and MiG-23 of the North Korean KPAAF intercepted a RC-135S in the Sea of Japan. A MiG-29 came within 50 feet of the aircraft. Another locked onto it with fire control radar in preparation to conduct a shoot down. The RC-135S changed course towards Japan and landed at Kadena airbase.
- On 30 April 2015, USAF RC-135V, 64-14848, operating out of Offutt AFB, NE aborted takeoff on a routine training mission, when crewmembers observed smoke and flames coming from the aft galley. The aircraft commander aborted the takeoff at about 50 KIAS and the cockpit crew, electronic warfare officers, intelligence operators and in-flight maintenance technicians—27 individuals in all—evacuated the aircraft. Although there were no injuries, except for minor smoke inhalation, the ensuing fire damaged aircraft control and mission related systems. Total repair cost was estimated at $62.4 million US. The cause of the mishap was failure by L3 Communications depot maintenance personnel to tighten a retaining nut connecting a metal oxygen tube to a junction fitting above the galley. The resulting fire melted the retaining nut and caused the tubing to become detached, feeding even more oxygen to the fire, which increased in size and caused severe damage to the airframe, galley and mission equipment aboard the aircraft. The oxygen line system work, which was listed as the cause of this 2015 mishap, was carried out in August 2013.
- On 29 September 2022, an RAF RC-135 Rivet Joint plane interacted with two Russian Su-27 aircraft, one of which released a missile in the vicinity of the RAF Rivet Joint beyond visual range. Russia claimed this was due to a technical malfunction, and acknowledged the incident took place over the Black Sea in international waters. The UK defence secretary, Ben Wallace, declared "we are incredibly lucky that the episode did not become worse". Later due to a set of classified data leaks, more information was released regarding the incident. According to two U.S. defense officials, the Russian pilot had misinterpreted what a radar operator on the ground was saying to him and thought he had permission to fire. The pilot, who had locked on the British aircraft, fired, but the missile did not launch properly.
- In May 2026, another incident involving Russian fighter jets and an RAF Rivet Joint aircraft occurred over the Black Sea. An Su-35 and an Su-27 carried out multiple passes of the aircraft, with the Su-27 passing within 6 metres (20 feet) of the nose of the RAF aircraft.

== Specifications (RC-135) ==
Data from USAF RC-135 Data Sheet

General characteristics

- Crew: 2 pilots, 2 navigator (flight crew)
- Capacity: 21–27 depending on mission requirements, minimum consisting of 4 Electronic Warfare Officers (Ravens), 14 Intelligence Operators and 4 Airborne Systems Engineers (mission crew)
- Length: 136 ft 3 in (41.53 m)
- Wingspan: 130 ft 10 in (39.88 m)
- Height: 41 ft 8 in (12.70 m)
- Wing area: 2,433 sq ft (226.0 m^{2})
- Airfoil: root: BAC 310/311/312; tip: BAC 313
- Empty weight: 124,000 lb (56,245 kg)
- Gross weight: 297,000 lb (134,717 kg)
- Max takeoff weight: 322,500 lb (146,284 kg)
- Powerplant: 4 × CFM International F-108-CF-201 turbofan engines, 22,000 lbf (98 kN) thrust each

Performance

- Maximum speed: 504 kn (580 mph, 933 km/h)
- Range: 2,998 nmi (3,450 mi, 5,552 km)
- Service ceiling: 50,000 ft (15,000 m)
- Rate of climb: 4,900 ft/min (25 m/s)

== See also ==
- Strategic Air Command – 1946–1992 US Air Force major command

Related development

- C-135 Stratolifter – Military transport aircraft by Boeing
- KC-135 Stratotanker – US military aerial refueling and transport aircraft
- Boeing EC-135 – Command and control aircraft by Boeing
- WC-135 Constant Phoenix – Atmospheric sampling aircraft by Boeing

Related lists

- List of active United States military aircraft
- List of United States Air Force reconnaissance aircraft
