= 338th Combat Training Squadron =

338th Combat Training Squadron

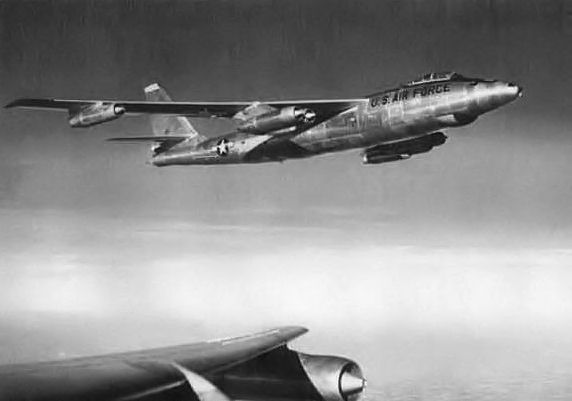
- 338th Strategic Reconnaissance Squadron Boeing RB-47Ks
- Active: 1942–1946; 1947–1949; 1950–1963; 1967; 1999–present
- Country: United States
- Branch: United States Air Force
- Role: Training
- Part of: Air Combat Command
- Garrison/HQ: Offutt Air Force Base
- Engagements: European Theater of Operations
- Decorations: Distinguished Unit Citation; Air Force Meritorious Unit Award; Air Force Outstanding Unit Award
- Battle honours: World War II

Commanders
- Notable commanders: Colonel Elewyn Guido Righetti [MIA 17 April 1945]

Insignia
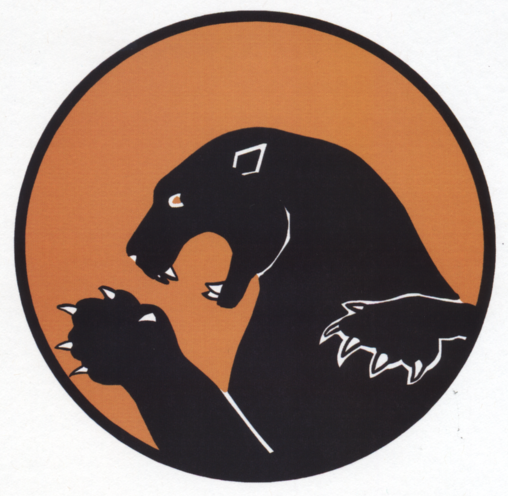
- 338th Combat Training Squadron emblem (approved 3 January 1943) (Note: Maurer gives the approval date as 3 June 1943. Maurer, Combat Squadrons, p. 419)

The 338th Combat Training Squadron is a United States Air Force unit. It is assigned to the 55th Operations Group, stationed at Offut Air Force Base, Nebraska. The 338 CTS performs the initial, requalification, and upgrade training as the RC-135 "Rivet Joint", "Cobra Ball", and "Combat Sent" Formal Training Unit (FTU).

== Mission ==
The 338th Combat Training Squadron (CTS) is a flying organization. It performs the initial, difference, requalification, and upgrade training as the Formal Training Unit (FTU) for the largest and most diverse operations group in Air Combat Command. Specifically, it provides the aforementioned training programs in accordance with HHQ approved training syllabi mostly for the RC-135 "Rivet Joint", "Cobra Ball", and "Combat Sent" variants. The unit prepares eight squadrons in six different programs to execute worldwide reconnaissance, command and control, and treaty verification missions directed by the NCA, JCS, theater CINCs, MAJCOM commanders and national intelligence agencies.

== History ==
Established in late 1942 as a P-38 Lightning fighter squadron, it trained under the Second Air Force in the Pacific northwest. It deployed to the European Theater of Operations (ETO), where it was assigned to VIII Fighter Command in England in late 1943. The squadron's mission was to provide long range fighter escort for B-17 Flying Fortress and B-24 Liberator heavy bombers on strategic bombing missions over Occupied Europe and Nazi Germany. In April 1944 it received P-51D Mustang fighter aircraft and continued its primary task of escorting B-17 and B-24 bombers that attacked such targets as industries and marshalling yards in Germany and airfields and V-weapon sites in France.

The squadron flew air patrols over the English Channel and bombed bridges in the Tours area during the Invasion of France in June 1944. In July it attacked gun emplacements during the Saint-Lô break out. The unit patrolled the Arnhem sector to support the airborne operation in the Netherlands in September 1944, and in December, transportation facilities during the Battle of the Bulge. During the Western Allied invasion of Germany, the squadron flew ground support missions by strafing trucks, locomotives and oil depots near Wesel when the Allies crossed the Rhine in March 1945; it continued offensive operations until 21 April 1945.

After the German capitulation, the unit became part of the United States Air Forces in Europe Army of Occupation, at AAF Station Kaufbeuren, then moved to AAF Station Giebelstadt in early 1946 where it received its first jet aircraft, the P-80A Shooting Star. Ii was inactivated in August 1946, when personnel were demobilized and its aircraft were transferred to the 31st Fighter Group.

The squadron was reactivated by the Strategic Air Command (SAC) in 1947 as a reconnaissance unit, equipped with RB-17 Flying Fortresses. It flew aerial photography, mapping, charting and photo reconnaissance missions, some of which were around the borders of the Soviet Union and over the Soviet Occupation Zone of Germany. Little was known about the air defense capability of the Soviet Union at this time, the most effective way of determining its capability was to probe the borders and see whether it would respond. Gradually the RB-17s and other aircraft mapped the perimeter of the Soviet Air Defenses from the Baltic to the Sea of Okhotsk, north of Japan.

The unit upgraded to RB-29 Superfotress aircraft in 1949 and continued its reconnaissance mission, however it was inactivated in 1949 due to budget reductions. Reactivated in 1950 at Ramey Air Force Base, Puerto Rico, it was again flying RB-29s, performing strategic reconnaissance, charting photography, precise electronic geodetic mapping and electronic reconnaissance missions. The squadron upgraded to RB-50 Superfortresses in 1952.

In 1954 it was equipped with RB-47K Stratojets, a variant of the B-47 which contained Side-Looking Radar and air sampling equipment. The RB-47K's primary mission was meteorological data collection and weather reconnaissance from Forbes AFB, Kansas. Photographic reconnaissance was a secondary mission. These missions consisted of flying over northern Canadian skies, with two such sorties being flown in a day, Weather Alpha and Weather Bravo. Weather Alpha sorties consisted of a flight from Forbes AFB, north to Saute Ste. Marie, Michigan, then north to Hudson's Bay, counterclockwise around the perimeter of the Bay and then back to Forbes. Weather Bravo took the same route within the United States but traveled east over the Labrador Sea and north of Goose Bay, Canada, then back to Forbes. The data collected by these flights was used to develop War Plan meteorological collection predictions for weather around the Soviet Union. Samples of radioactive fallout from foreign nuclear tests could also be taken. The RB-37Ks served with the 338th for eight years, being phased out in 1963.

The unit was reactivated in 1999 at Offutt AFB, Nebraska as a Combat Training Squadron. It trains and equips aircrew to execute a variety of HHQ missions on the RC-135 and its variants.

== Lineage ==
- Constituted as the 338th Fighter Squadron (Two Engine) on 10 September 1942

Activated on 12 September 1942
Redesignated 338th Fighter Squadron, Twin Engine on 20 August 1943
Redesignated 338th Fighter Squadron, Single Engine on 5 September 1944
Inactivated on 20 August 1946

- Redesignated 338th Reconnaissance Squadron, Very Long Range, Mapping on 3 February 1947

Activated on 15 March 1947
Redesignated 338th Strategic Reconnaissance Squadron, Photographic-Mapping on 1 July 1949
Inactivated on 14 October 1949

- Redesignated 338th Strategic Reconnaissance Squadron, Medium, Photographic-Mapping on 27 October 1950

Activated on 1 November 1950
Redesignated 338th Strategic Reconnaissance Squadron, Medium on 15 July 1954
Discontinued and inactivated on 15 June 1963

- Redesignated 338th Strategic Reconnaissance Squadron and activated on 24 February 1967 (not organized)

Organized on 25 March 1967
Discontinued and inactivated on 25 December 1967

- Redesignated 338th Combat Training Squadron on 7 September 1999

Activated on 20 September 1999

=== Assignments ===
- 55th Fighter Group, 12 Sep 1942 – 20 Aug 1946
- 5th Reconnaissance Group, 15 March 1947
- Strategic Air Command, 26 May 1949
- 55th Strategic Reconnaissance Group, 1 Jun-14 Oct 1949; 1 November 1950

Attached to 91st Strategic Reconnaissance Wing, 1 Nov-1 Dec 1950

- 55th Strategic Reconnaissance Wing, 16 Jun 1952 – 15 Jun 1963
- Strategic Air Command, 24 February 1967
- 55th Strategic Reconnaissance Wing, 25 March-25 Dec 1967
- 55th Operations Group, 20 Sep 1999–Present

=== Stations ===
- Paine Field, Washington, 12 September 1942
- McChord Field, Washington, 12 Sep 1942 – 20 Aug 1943
- RAF Nuthampstead (AAF-131), England, 14 September 1943
- RAF Wormingford (AAF-159), England, 16 April 1944
- AAF Station Kaufbeuren, Germany, 22 July 1945
- AAF Station Giebelstadt, Germany, 30 Apr-20 Aug 1946
- Harmon Field AAB, Guam, 15 March 1947
- Los Negros Island, 20 June 1947
- Clark Field, Philippines, 9 Jan 1948 – 6 May 1949
- Fairfield-Suisun AFB, California, 26 May 1949
- Topeka (later, Forbes) AFB, Kansas, 1 Jun-14 Oct 1949
- Barksdale AFB, Louisiana, 1 November 1950
- Ramey AFB, Puerto Rico, 25 November 1950
- Forbes AFB, Kansas 21 Oct 1952 – 15 Jun 1963
- Offutt Air Force Base Nebraska, 24 Feb-25 Dec 1967; 20 Sep 1999–Present

=== Aircraft ===
- P-38, 1942–1944
- P-51, 1944–1946
- F-13, 1947
- F-2, 1947–1949
- RB-17, 1947–1949
- B-29, 1949; RB-29, 1950–1951
- RB-50, 1950–1954
- RB-47, 1954–1963; EB/RB-47, 1967.
- RC-135, 1999-present
