= Seattle Fighter Wing =

- Active: 1942–1944
- Country: United States
- Branch: United States Army; United States Air Force (Note: When the United States Air Force became a separate service in September 1947, all former Army Air Forces units, including disbanded units were transferred to its control.)
- Role: Command and training of fighter units

The Seattle Fighter Wing was a United States Army Air Forces unit. The wing provided air defense of the Northwestern United States and trained fighter units and pilots. It was stationed at Seattle, Washington, where it was disbanded on 7 June 1944.

== History ==
Along the Pacific coast, Western Defense Command established a "vital air defense zone", extending from the coast approximately 150 miles (240 km) inland and 200 miles (320 km) to sea. To carry out this mission, Fourth Air Force organized regional air defense wings in August 1942. The Seattle Air Defense Wing was organized to provide air defense for the northwest Pacific coast and train fighter groups and pilots. Its air defense responsibility was to provide protection primarily for the Boeing plants and military facilities in the northwest from Vancouver, British Columbia to Portland, Oregon. The wing consisted of fighter groups assigned to airfields in the northwest engaged in training and would, if necessary, provide a defensive unit in case of, presumably, a Japanese attack.

The Army Air Forces later found that standard military units like the wing, whose manning was based on relatively inflexible tables of organization were not well adapted to the training mission, even more so to the replacement mission. Accordingly, the Army Air Forces adopted a more functional system in which each base was organized into a separate numbered unit, with similar flexible units established for headquarters.

In this reorganization, the wing's headquarters squadron was replaced by the 412th AAF Base Unit (Fighter Wing) on 1 April 1944. Maurer writes that the wing itself was disbanded on 7 June 1944. and the 412th was redescribed as the 412th AAF Base Unit (Air Defense Region). Other air force documents say that the June 1944 action was a redesignation to the Seattle ADR, 412 AAFBU. In 1946, it became the 412th AAF Base Unit (Seattle Control Group). On 1 January 1947, it became the 412th AAF Base Unit (Western Aircraft Warning and Control Group). It moved to McChord Field the following month. It was discontinued at McChord on 20 May 1947 and its personnel and assets used to form the 505th Aircraft Control and Warning Group.

== Lineage ==
- Constituted as the Seattle Air Defense Wing on 6 August 1942

Activated on 11 August 1942
Redesignated the Seattle Fighter Wing c. 2 July 1943
Disbanded on 7 June 1944 or redesignated Seattle Air Defence Region, 412th AAF Base Unit.

=== Assignments ===
- IV Fighter Command, 11 August 1942
- Fourth Air Force, 31 March – 7 June 1944

=== Components ===
- 55th Fighter Group: 22 June 1942 – 23 August 1943
- 372d Fighter Group: 7 December 1943 – 29 March 1944
- 478th Fighter Group: 3 February – 31 March 1944

=== Stations ===
- Seattle, Washington, 20 August 1942 – 7 June 1944
