= Giebelstadt (Verwaltungsgemeinschaft) =

- Verwaltungsgemeinschaft
- Location of Giebelstadt within Würzburg district
- Interactive map of Giebelstadt
- Location within Germany Location within Bavaria
- Coordinates: 49°39′N 9°57′E
- Country: Germany
- State: Bavaria
- Admin. region: Lower Franconia
- District: Würzburg
- Seat: Giebelstadt
- Subdivisions: 2 municipalities

Area
  - Total: 84.31 km^{2} (32.55 sq mi)

Population (2025-12-31)
  - Total: 6,835
  - Density: 81.07/km^{2} (210.0/sq mi)
- Time zone: UTC+01:00 (CET)
  - Summer (DST): UTC+02:00 (CEST)

Giebelstadt is a Verwaltungsgemeinschaft (municipal association) in the district of Würzburg in Bavaria, Germany. Its seat is in Giebelstadt.

It consists of the following municipalities:

1. Bütthard
2. Giebelstadt
