= Giebelstadt Airport =

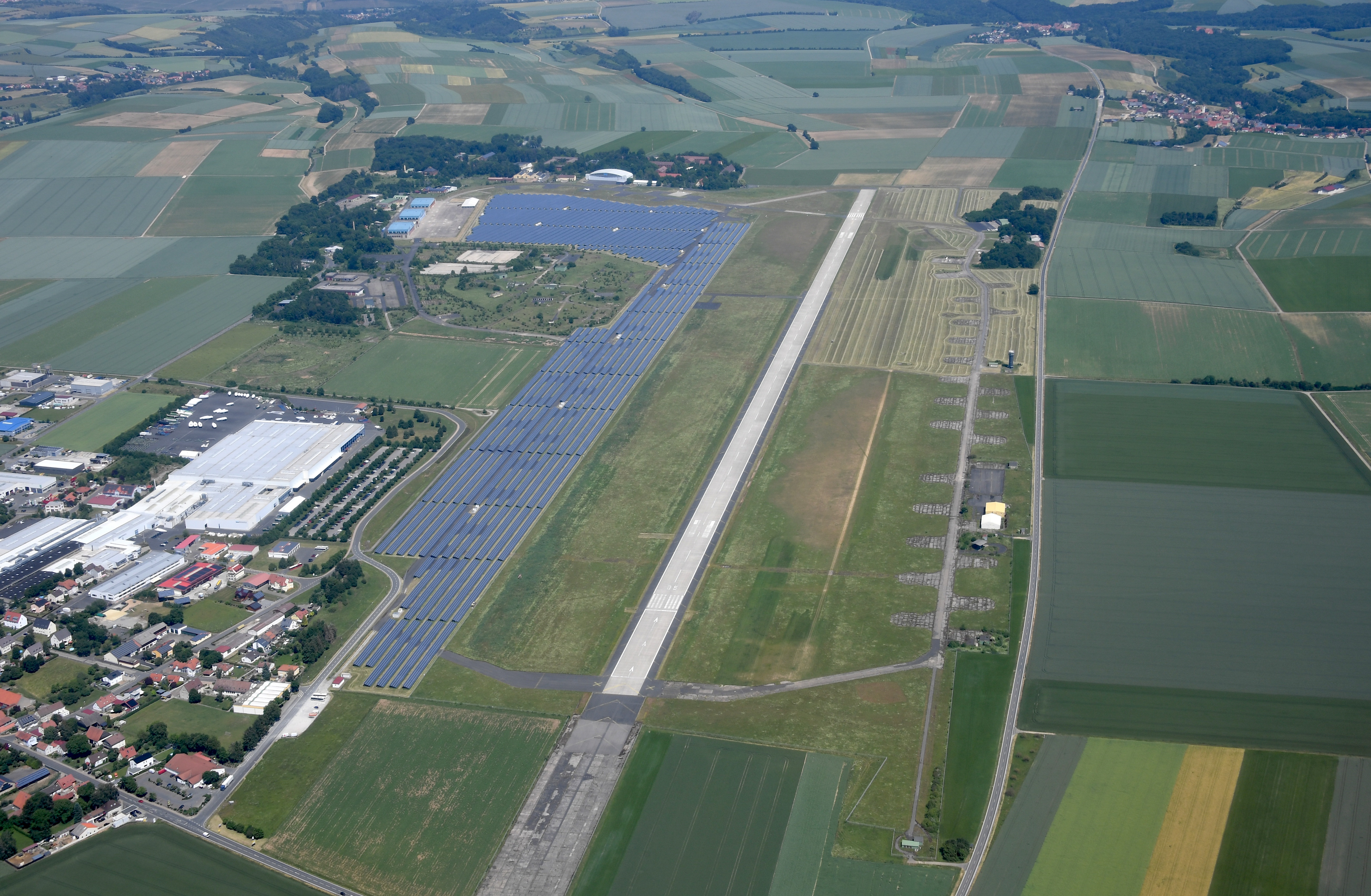
- IATA: GHF; ICAO: EDQG

Summary
- Airport type: Civil
- Serves: Würzburg, Germany
- Elevation AMSL: 980 ft / 299 m
- Coordinates: 49°38′52″N 009°57′54″E

Map

Runways
Direction	Length		Surface
Direction	m	ft	Surface
08/26	2,135	7,005	Asphalt

Giebelstadt Airport (IATA: GHF, ICAO: EDQG) is a general aviation airport located in Germany, southwest of Giebelstadt in Bavaria. The airport is the only public-use airfield in the Würzburg region. It offers private aircraft and charter operations. It was known as Giebelstadt Army Airfield before 2006.

== History ==
The airport was opened as a private, general aviation facility in February 2001 as a joint military-civilian use agreement was made between the United States Army and the German government. After the closure of Giebelstadt Army Airfield, the civil airport became the sole user of the airfield. During World War 2 it Was used as an airfield for the Luftwaffe, after the war the Americans used it as their own airbase.

== See also ==
- Transport in Germany
- List of airports in Germany
