= IV Fighter Command =

United States Air Force unit from 1941 to 1944

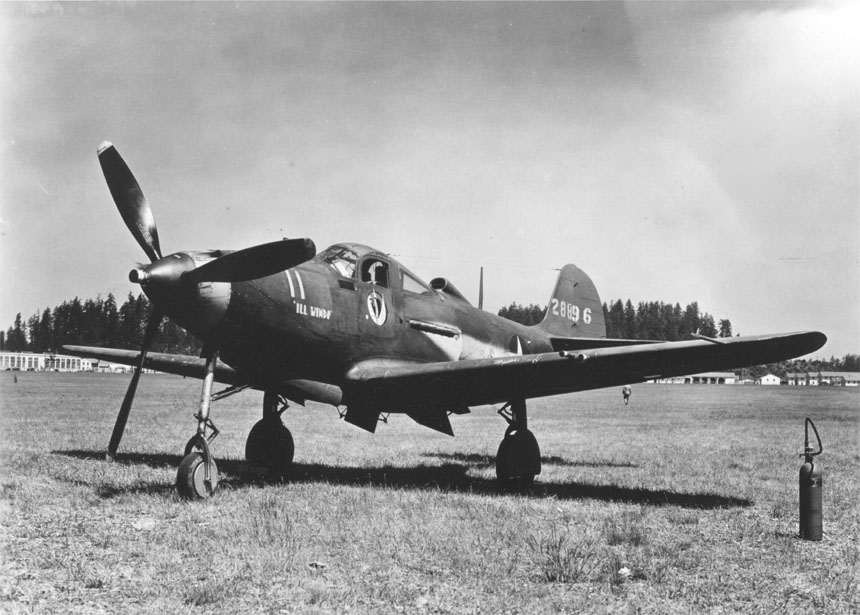
- A P-39 Airacobra of the 354th Fighter Group while training (Note: Aircraft is Bell P-39N-BE Airacobra, serial 42-8896, of the 353d Fighter Squadron, named Ill Winds.)
- Active: 1941–1944
- Country: United States
- Branch: United States Army; United States Air Force
- Type: Command and training of fighter units

Commanders
- Notable commanders: Millard F. Harmon; William E. Kepner

Insignia
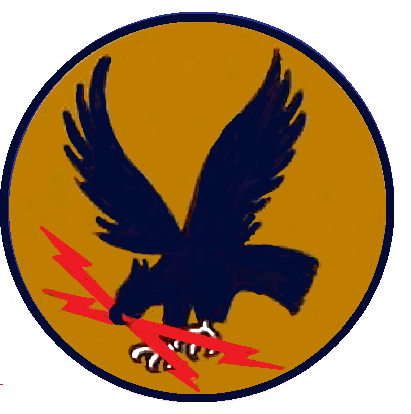
- IV Fighter Command emblem (Note: Approved 28 November 1942.)

The IV Fighter Command is a disbanded United States Air Force unit. It was activated under Fourth Air Force at March Field, California in June 1941, when it replaced a provisional organization. It was responsible for training fighter units and for the air defense of the southern portion of the Pacific Coast. Following the attack on Pearl Harbor, the command's units were placed on alert. In 1942, its air defense responsibility was expanded to include the entire Pacific coast of the continental United States and the command moved its headquarters from southern California to Oakland Airport, California, which was more centrally located. As the threat to the Pacific decreased, it was disbanded on 31 March 1944.

== History ==
=== Background ===
GHQ Air Force (GHQ AF) had been established with two major combat functions, to maintain a striking force against long range targets, and the air defense of the United States. In the spring of 1941, the War Department established four strategic defense areas and GHQ AF reorganized its Southwest Air District as 4th Air Force with responsibility for air defense planning and organization along the west coast and in the southwest. 4th Air Force activated 4th Interceptor Command at March Field, California on 8 July 1941, under the command of Major General Millard F. Harmon. (Note: This command is not related to a previous Interceptor Command, 4th Air Force, apparently a provisional organization, that was organized on 22 April 1941 and discontinued on 8 July 1941.)

=== Air defense ===
The attack on Pearl Harbor put all units in the Western Theater of Operations on heightened alert. The first Lockheed P-38 Lightnings of the 1st Pursuit Group arrived in San Diego, California on 8 December 1941, and the entire group had arrived in California from Michigan to reinforce the command's air defenses by 22 December. Additional reinforcements in mid-December arrived in the form of the 1st Marine Aircraft Wing, which moved from Virginia. The command was charged with control of "active agents" for air defense in its area of responsibility, which included interceptor aircraft, antiaircraft artillery and barrage balloons. Civilian organizations provided air raid warnings and enforced blackouts and came under the authority of the Office of Civilian Defense. Radar was initially not sufficiently developed to be included in air defense systems, There were only ten radars to guard the Pacific coast, but the command worked "feverishly" to create a ground observer corps and coastal radar net as elements of its Aircraft Warning Service. However, it soon became apparent that having two commands responsible for air defense in the Western Theater of Operations was impractical, and in early 1942, the 4th took over responsibility for air defense of the entire Pacific coast, replacing 2d Interceptor Command in the northwest. In June it moved its headquarters north to Oakland Airport, California, which was more centrally located for its increased area of responsibility.

Along the Pacific coast, Western Defense Command established a "vital air defense zone", extending from the coast approximately 150 miles (240 km) inland and 200 miles (320 km) to sea, with long range bombers from 4th Bomber Command flying patrols over the ocean. 14th Antiaircraft Command, an artillery unit, was placed under the operational control what was now 4th Fighter Command. Regional air defense wings were established in August 1942 at San Diego, Los Angeles, San Francisco and Seattle Fifteen new radar sites were established, and several of the original ten were resited due to unsuitability of their locations. Coverage was extended northwards and southwards when arrangements were made for the Royal Canadian Air Force to provide information from radar sites in British Columbia and three sites were constructed in Baja California, Mexico. With the Japanese attacks on Midway and the Aleutians, additional balloon and antiaircraft units were moved to the Pacific coast and the command was reinforced by units from 2nd Air Force. Additional reinforcements were prepared, but the victory at Midway led to cancellation of their movements. As the possibility of an attack on the Pacific coast grew more remote, the air defense wings became increasingly concerned with the training mission. The command continued to support the air defense mission until September 1943.

=== Unit and crew training ===
In 1942, Air Force Combat Command had established an Operational Training Unit (OTU) system for 2nd and 3d Air Forces. The system was later extended to 4th Air Force. Although it was originally intended to confine the OTU system to 2d and 3rd Air Forces, too much of the Army Air Forces (AAF)'s aircrew and aircraft were assigned to 4th Air Force to permit the command to forego training responsibilities entirely. In May 1942, all pursuit groups assumed OTU responsibility. Even though AAF designated the units of the command to form the first "parent" and "satellite" of the program, it was not until October that Fourth Air Force even submitted a plan to operate OTUs, and not until January 1943 did the first unit, the 354th Fighter Group, begin to train under the OTU system. However, the command's training program was "seriously jeopardized" during early 1943, when Bell P-39 Airacobras programmed for delivery to command units were diverted to the Soviet Air Forces. Similar problems affected the command's P-38 Lightning training programs. Curtiss-Wright AT-9 Jeeps were not available to qualify fighter pilots on twin engine operations, and during the command's active period, there were never enough P-38s on hand, requiring some fighter training for P-38 units to be conducted with single engine P-39s.

Shortly thereafter, it was decided that one of the command's groups would be manned at 50% overstrength in order to train and supply replacement pilots for overseas units. This was the beginning of the Replacement Training Unit (RTU) program, which replaced a system in which individuals were selected from existing units to fill overseas vacancies. Replacement training at Muroc Army Air Field began in the fall. Unlike I Fighter Command, which specialized in OTUs and III Fighter Command, which consisted mostly of RTUs, the command's training included both types of units In time, however, the RTU program became the major type of training in all the continental air forces. As early as September 1943, Hq AAF announced that no more fighter OTUs would be formed. The last OTU fighter groups completed training early in 1944, and training turned sharply to replacement training.

The command also participated in joint fighter-bomber training with units of II Bomber Command. In these exercises, command fighters would provide escort for bombers searching for enemy vessels or act as interceptors against bombers simulating attacks on coastal targets.

=== Disbanding ===
The AAF was finding that standard military units, whose manning was based on relatively inflexible tables of organization were not well adapted to the training mission, even less so to the replacement mission. Accordingly, the AAF adopted a more functional system in which each base was organized into a separate numbered unit. In connection with this general reorganization, Fourth Air Force disbanded IV Fighter Command and transferred its responsibilities to wings that were headquartered by AAF base units.

== Lineage ==
- Constituted as 4th Interceptor Command on 26 May 1941 (Note: Maurer indicates that the unit was constituted as the "IV" Interceptor Command. However, the unit was constituted and activated with an arabic number in its name. The use of Roman numerals to designate Army Air Forces combat commands did not begin until September 1942. "Air Force Historical Research Agency Organizational Reconds: Types of USAF Organizations". Air Force History Index. 9 January 2008..)

Activated on 8 July 1941
Redesignated 4th Fighter Command on 15 May 1942
Redesignated as IV Fighter Command c. 18 September 1942
Disbanded on 31 March 1944 (Note: Although disbanded while still an Army unit, the command was transferred to the United States Air Force when it became an independent service in September 1947.)

=== Components ===
Command

- 4th Antiaircraft Command: operational control 1942 – unknown

Wings

- 85th Fighter Wing: 28 November 1943 – 10 January 1944
- Los Angeles Air Defense Wing (later Los Angeles Fighter Wing): 20 August 1942 – 31 March 1944
- San Diego Air Defense Wing (later San Diego Fighter Wing): 20 August 1942 – 31 March 1944
- San Francisco Air Defense Wing (later San Francisco Fighter Wing): 20 August 1942 – 31 March 1944
- Seattle Air Defense Wing (later Seattle Fighter Wing): 20 August 1942 – 31 March 1944

Groups

- 1st Pursuit Group (later 1st Fighter Group), attached 22 December 1941 – January 1942, assigned January 1942 – 10 June 1942
- 14th Pursuit Group (later 14th Fighter Group), attached 17 October – December 1941, assigned 26 January – August 1942
- 20th Pursuit Group (later 20th Fighter Group), 1 October 1941 – 25 August 1943 (attached to Third Air Force c. February – September 1942; Seattle Air Defense Wing October 1942 – unknown)
- 35th Pursuit Group, 2 October 1941 – 23 April 1942
- 51st Pursuit Group, attached 14 October 1941 – c. 12 January 1942
- 55th Pursuit Group (later 55th Fighter Group), 16 January 1942 – 12 April 1943 (attached to Seattle Air Defense Wing after 28 October 1942)
- 328th Fighter Group, 10 July 1942 – 12 April 1943; 1–31 March 1944 (attached to San Francisco Air Defense Wing [later San Francisco Fighter Wing] after c. 28 October 1942)
- 329th Fighter Group, 10 July 1942 – 10 April 1943
- 354th Fighter Group, 15 November 1942 – c. 3 November 1943
- 363d Fighter Group, 1 March – 12 April 1943
- 412th Fighter Group, 29 November 1943 – 31 March 1944
- 461st Bombardment Group, 29 November 1943 – 31 March 1944
- 479th Fighter Group, 15 October – 1 November 1943

Squadrons

- 426th Night Fighter Squadron: 1 January – 7 February 1944
- 427th Night Fighter Squadron: 1 January – 11 June 1944 (attached to 481st Night Fighter Operational Training Group)
- 547th Night Fighter Squadron: 31 March – 4 September 1944

=== Stations ===
- March Field, California, 8 July 1941
- Riverside Municipal Airport, California, c. July 1941
- Oakland Airport, California, June 1942 – 31 March 1944

=== Campaigns ===
Campaign Streamer	Campaign	Dates	Notes
	American Theater without inscription	7 December 1941 – 31 March 1944	

== See also ==
- Battle of Los Angeles
