= San Diego Fighter Wing =

- Active: 1942–1944
- Country: United States
- Branch: United States Army; United States Air Force (Note: When the United States Air Force became a separate service in September 1947, all former Army Air Forces units, including disbanded units were transferred to its control.)
- Role: Air defense and fighter training
- Engagements: World War II

The San Diego Fighter Wing is a disbanded United States Air Force unit. The wing provided air defense of southern California and trained fighter units and pilots. It was stationed at San Diego, California, where it was disbanded on 7 June 1944.

== History ==
Along the Pacific coast, Western Defense Command established a "vital air defense zone", extending from the coast approximately 150 miles (240 km) inland and 200 miles (320 km) to sea. To carry out this mission, Fourth Air Force organized regional air defense wings in August 1942. Only one squadron of Army Air Forces fighters were attached to the wing, with most tactical elements drawn from the Navy.

== Lineage ==
- Constituted as the San Diego Air Defense Wing on 6 August 1942

Activated on 11 August 1942
Redesignated San Diego Fighter Wing in July 1943
Disbanded on 7 June 1944

=== Assignments ===
- IV Fighter Command, 11 August 1942
- Fourth Air Force, 31 March 1944 – 7 June 1944

=== Stations ===
- San Diego, California, 20 August 1942 – 7 June 1944
