= Giebelstadt =

- Municipality
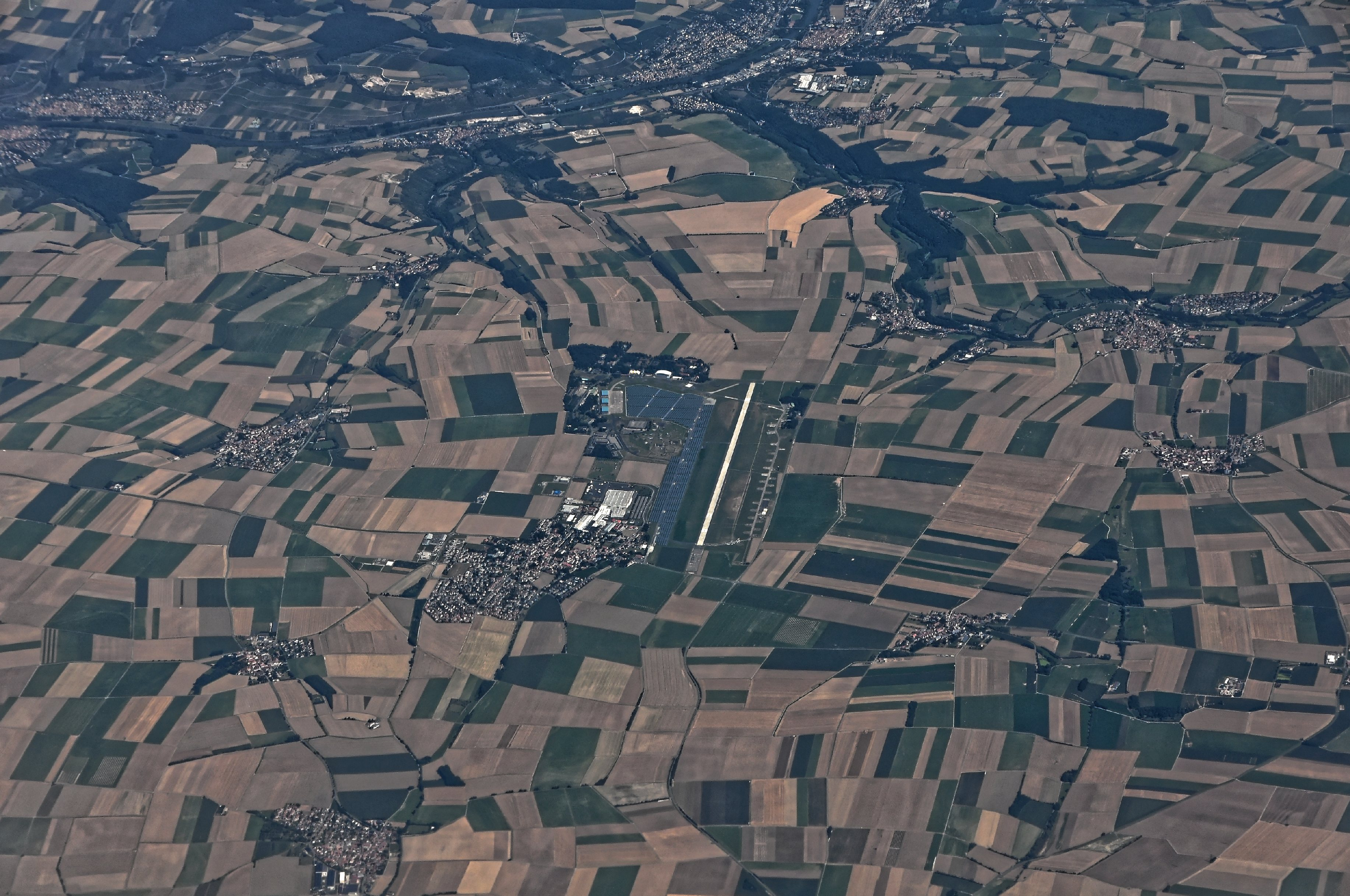
- Giebelstadt and the Giebelstadt Airport

- Coat of arms

- Location of Giebelstadt within Würzburg district
- Interactive map of Giebelstadt
- Location within Germany Location within Bavaria
- Coordinates: 49°39′N 09°57′E
- Country: Germany
- State: Bavaria
- Admin. region: Unterfranken
- District: Würzburg
- Municipal assoc.: Giebelstadt
- Subdivisions: 7 Ortsteile

Government
  - Mayor (2020–26): Helmut Krämer

Area
  - Total: 48.05 km^{2} (18.55 sq mi)
- Elevation: 300 m (980 ft)

Population (2025-12-31)
  - Total: 5,556
  - Density: 115.6/km^{2} (299.5/sq mi)
- Time zone: UTC+01:00 (CET)
  - Summer (DST): UTC+02:00 (CEST)
- Postal codes: 97232
- Dialling codes: 09334
- Vehicle registration: WÜ
- Website: www.giebelstadt.de

Giebelstadt (German pronunciation: [ˈɡiːbl̩ʃtat]) is a municipality in the district of Würzburg in Bavaria in Germany.

== History ==
The town is the birthplace of Florian Geyer (1490–1525), also known as "Florian Geier from Giebelstadt", a Franconian nobleman who led the Black Company during the German Peasants' War resulting from the Protestant Reformation in Germany in the 16th century. Florian led the revolt to the Bishop's Residence in Würzburg where the revolt was repressed.

In 1935, the construction of the Giebelstadt airfield was authorized. It was first operated by the German Luftwaffe in World War II. During this time, Adolf Hitler built an escape railroad track that led to the airfield, which was discovered by the U.S. Army in 1945. Giebelstadt supported 5,786 soldiers and their families during the U.S. Army's 62-year history until its closure along with the U.S. Forces draw down of Würzburg area in 2006. The airfield has since been renamed Giebelstadt Airport to host civilian flight operations. At the closure of the airfield it was found that there were more than 200 items of unexploded ordnance within and in the surrounding grounds of the barracks where single soldiers were housed.

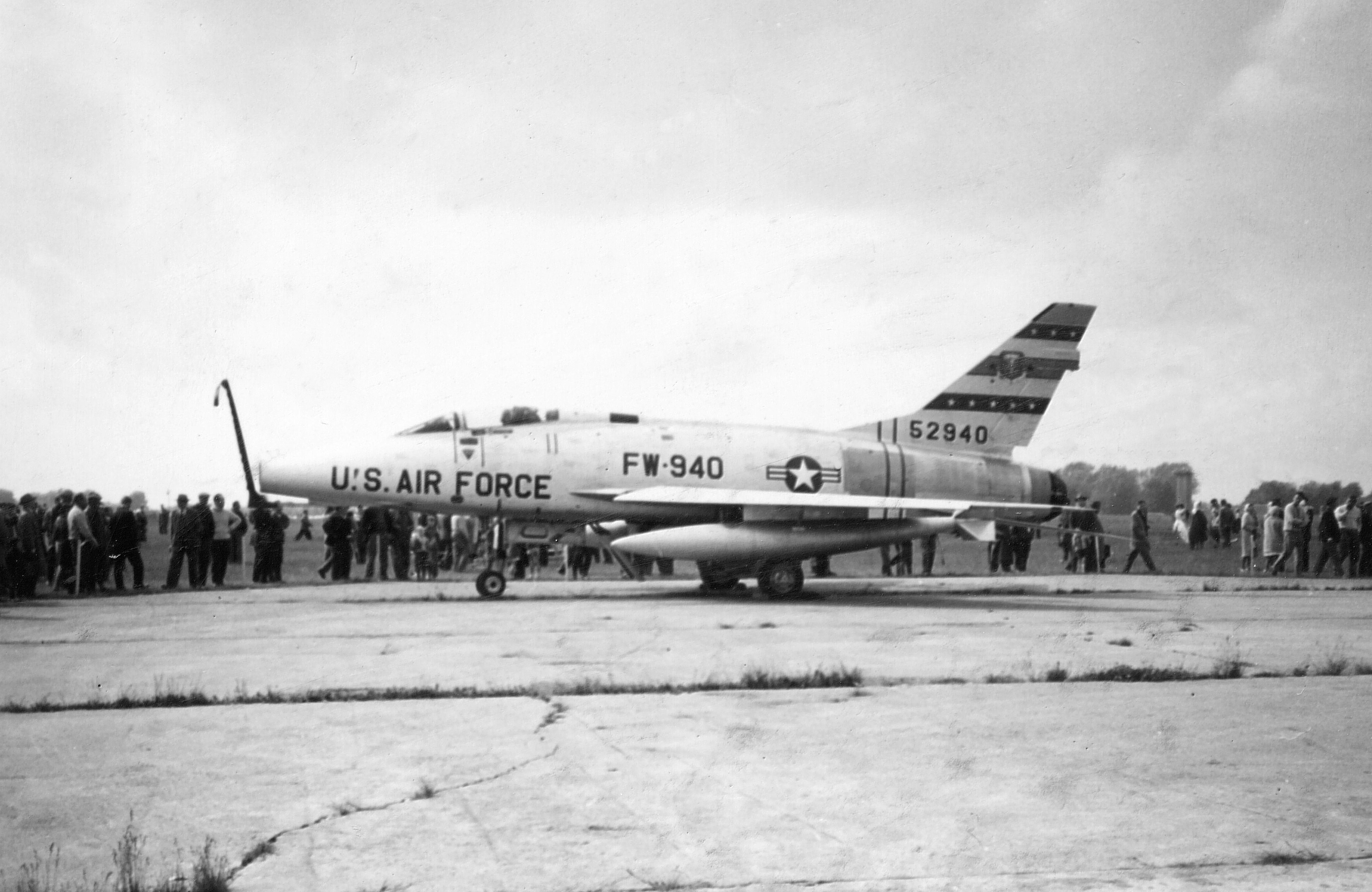
F-100D Super Sabre, 50th TFW, Giebelstadt AB, Jun 1961

== Scenery and culture ==
The town is surrounded by fields characterized by a rolling landscape. Giebelstadt has a population of about 5,000 people, and has the largest volunteer fire department in its area. Giebelstadts population consists of 92% German, 5% Eastern European, 1% that of Asian, middle eastern and American

== Facilities ==
The Giebelstadt Volunteer Fire Department is equipped and trained to respond to medical emergencies, "NOTARZT" or Emergency on call Doctor can respond to situations within 10 minutes via Medical Air Evacuation where the patient will either be transferred to the Ochsenfurt Hospital known as Main Klinik, or the University Hospital Würzburg, depending on the nature of the injury.

Noted Manufactures The largest employer in Giebelstadt is BAVARIA YACHT, a Bavarian Yacht company owned by American investors. The majority of sales are to Europe and Asia.

Giebelstadt Metropolitan Eẞfeld, Bütthard, Sulzdorf, Kirchheim, Gaubüttelbrunn, Allersheim, Gützingen, Höttingen, Gaurettersheim Tiefenthal, Geroldshausen

== Climate ==
Climate in this area has little difference between highs and lows, and there is adequate rainfall year-round. The Köppen Climate Classification subtype for this climate is "Cfb" (Marine West Coast Climate/Oceanic climate).

Climate data for Giebelstadt
Month	Jan	Feb	Mar	Apr	May	Jun	Jul	Aug	Sep	Oct	Nov	Dec	Year
Mean daily maximum °C (°F)	2 (35)	3 (38)	9 (48)	13 (56)	17 (63)	21 (70)	24 (75)	23 (73)	20 (68)	13 (56)	7 (44)	3 (38)	6 (42)
Mean daily minimum °C (°F)	−2 (28)	−2 (29)	2 (35)	4 (40)	9 (48)	12 (53)	14 (57)	13 (56)	11 (51)	6 (42)	2 (36)	0 (32)	6 (42)
Average precipitation mm (inches)	43 (1.7)	33 (1.3)	36 (1.4)	41 (1.6)	51 (2)	58 (2.3)	64 (2.5)	56 (2.2)	48 (1.9)	43 (1.7)	41 (1.6)	48 (1.9)	560 (22.1)
Source: Weatherbase
