= Bütthard =

- Municipality
- Coat of arms

- Location of Bütthard within Würzburg district
- Interactive map of Bütthard
- Location within Germany Location within Bavaria
- Coordinates: 49°36′N 9°53′E
- Country: Germany
- State: Bavaria
- Admin. region: Unterfranken
- District: Würzburg
- Municipal assoc.: Giebelstadt

Government
  - Mayor (2020–26): Peter Ernst (CSU)

Area
  - Total: 36.26 km^{2} (14.00 sq mi)
- Elevation: 290 m (950 ft)

Population (2025-12-31)
  - Total: 1,279
  - Density: 35.27/km^{2} (91.36/sq mi)
- Time zone: UTC+01:00 (CET)
  - Summer (DST): UTC+02:00 (CEST)
- Postal codes: 97244
- Dialling codes: 09336
- Vehicle registration: WÜ
- Website: www.buetthard.de

Bütthard is a municipality in the district of Würzburg in Bavaria, Germany.
