= 55th Operations Group =

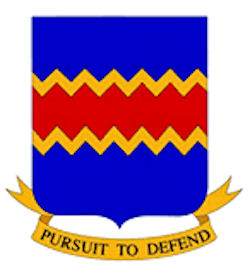
- Emblem of the 55th Fighter Group (World War II)
- Active: 1940–1946; 1947–1949; 1950–1952; 1991–present
- Country: United States
- Branch: United States Air Force
- Role: Reconnaissance
- Part of: Air Combat Command
- Garrison/HQ: Offutt Air Force Base
- Motto(s): Pursuit to Defend (WW II)

Commanders
- Current commander: Colonel John J. Isacco
- Senior Enlisted Leader: Chief Master Sergeant Tabatha A. Sanders

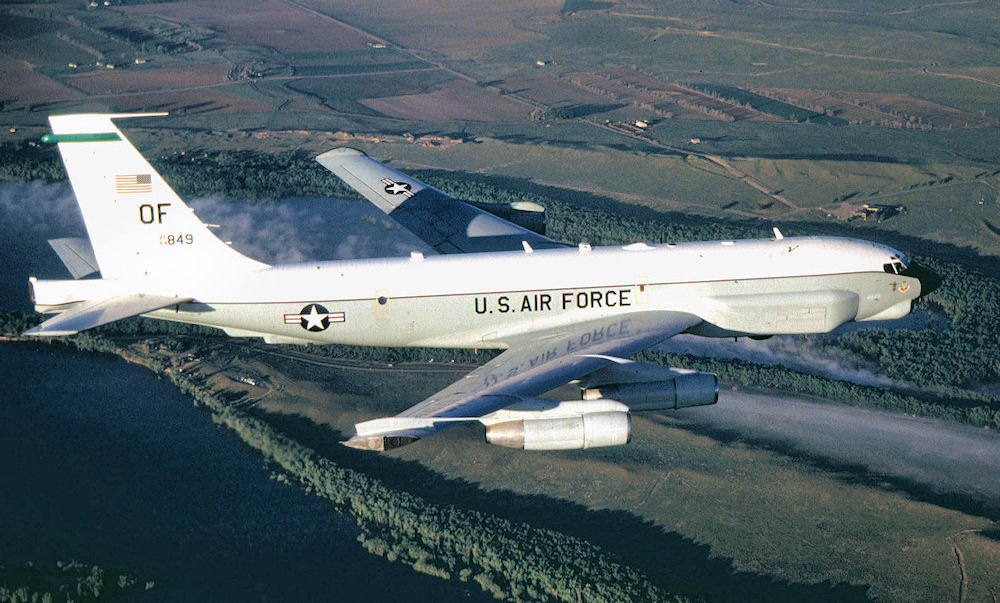
Boeing RC-135U Combat Sent 64-14849 intelligence aircraft located at Offutt Air Force Base, Neb., provides strategic electronic reconnaissance information to the President, Secretary of Defense, Department of Defense leaders and theater commanders.

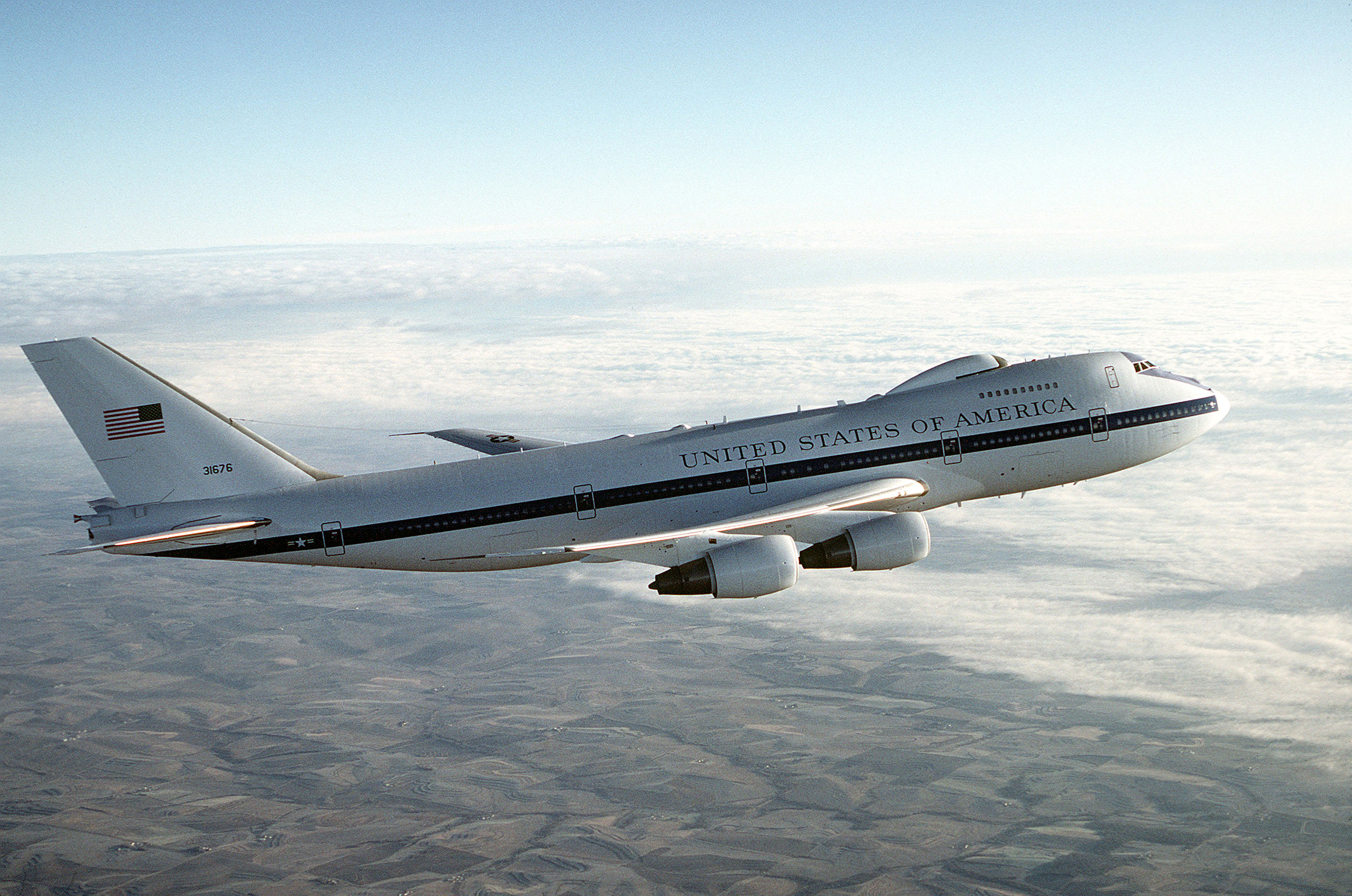
Boeing E-4B Nightwatch, 73-1676, of the 1st ACCS, the command plane of the United States Air Force

The 55th Operations Group (55 OG) is a component of the 55th Wing, assigned to the United States Air Force Air Combat Command. The group is stationed at Offut Air Force Base, Nebraska.

During World War II the group was an Eighth Air Force fighter unit stationed in England. It claimed 316.5 air and 216.5 ground aircraft destroyed. It flew its last mission on 21 April 1945.

== Overview ==
The 55th Operations Group, the U.S. Air Force's largest operations group, located at Offutt Air Force Base, Nebraska, has operational control over 12 squadrons and two detachments worldwide. The group consists of approximately 3,200 personnel.

The group's mission is to provide worldwide reconnaissance, real-time intelligence, command and control, information warfare and combat support to U.S. leaders and commanders.

It employs 46 aircraft, including 13 models of seven different types. Mission responsibility includes the Air Force's most diverse flying operations supporting worldwide reconnaissance, command and control, Presidential support, and nuclear treaty verification.

== Assigned Units ==
The 55th Operations Group uses the tail code OF for its aircraft

- 38th Reconnaissance Squadron (RC-135, TC-135)
- 45th Reconnaissance Squadron (OC-135, RC-135, TC-135, WC-135)
- 55th Intelligence Support Squadron
- 55th Operations Support Squadron
- 82d Reconnaissance Squadron (RC-135)
  Operates from Kadena AB, Japan
- 95th Reconnaissance Squadron (RC-135)
  Operates from: RAF Mildenhall, England
  Operates from: Souda Bay, Crete
- 97th Intelligence Squadron
- 338th Combat Training Squadron
- 343d Reconnaissance Squadron (RC-135, TC-135)
- 390th Intelligence Squadron
- 488th Intelligence Squadron

== History ==
For additional history and lineage, see 55th Wing

The 55th Operations Group traces its lineage to the 55th Pursuit (Interceptor) Group during World War II. During the war, the 55th Pursuit Group garnered two Distinguished Unit Citations. The group fostered 16 aces who were credited with 90 air-to-air victories.

After the war, Strategic Air Command activated and redesignated the 55th Fighter Group as the 55th Reconnaissance group at MacDill Field, Florida, operating the RB-17. The newly activated group's mission consisted of aerial photography, mapping, charting, and photo reconnaissance missions, some of which flew around the globe.

Activated after the end of the Cold War, the 55th Operations Group has maintained an unmatched operational tempo, supporting every US contingency worldwide.

=== World War II ===
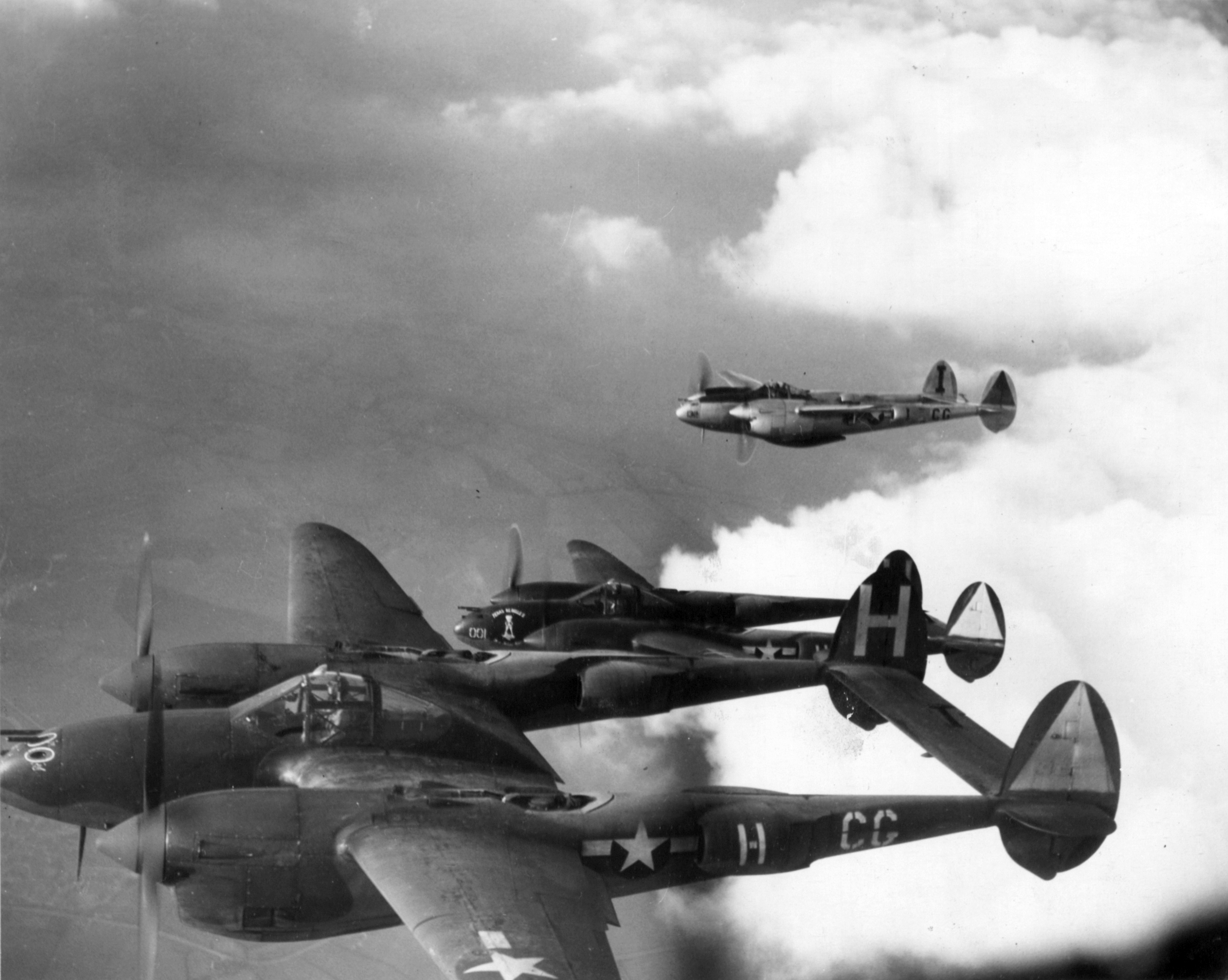
Lockheed P-38J-10-LO Lightning 42-67811 (CG-H) of the 38th Fighter Squadron.

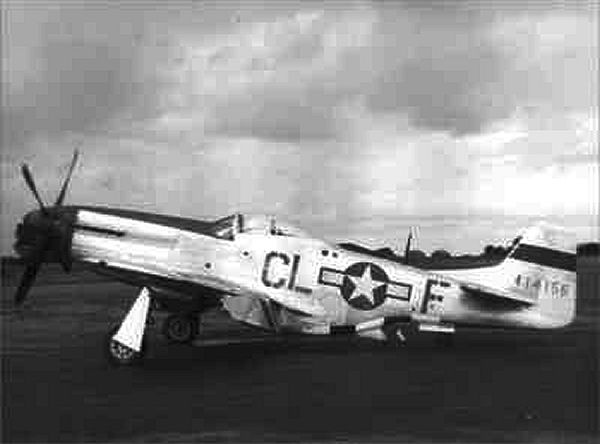
North American P-51D-10-NA Mustang Serial 44-14156 (CL-F) of the 338th Fighter Squadron.

The history of the Fightin' Fifty-Fifth began in January 1941, when the 55th Pursuit Group was activated at Hamilton Field, California. Training along the west coast, the group move to England, August- September 1943 and was assigned to VIII Fighter Command.

The 55th FG began operations with Lockheed P-38H Lightnings on 15 October 1943, and was the first to use these aircraft on long-range escort missions from the UK. The P-38H differed from earlier versions in being powered by 1425 hp Allison V-1710-89/91 engines.

The Lightnings' engines were troubled by the addition of alcohol used as an anti-knock compound in their fuel supply; a British war economy solution which caused problems with water condensation on the ground and fuel line icing at altitude. Another British attempt to correct fuel composition caused lead metal deposits to coat cylinders and foul plugs throughout the squadron. The -H series Lightnings did not have adequate cooling for extended high-power usage, as their engine development had outstripped the cooling capacity of the integral intercooler which ran through the wing's leading edge. Pilots were instructed to restrict their periods of highest engine power to defined time limits, but many did not. As a result of these various influences, the Group's Lightnings suffered a high rate of attrition. Nevertheless, 55FG P-38H pilots provided cover for missions against aircraft plants during Big Week in February 1944. Lt. Col. Jack Jenkins led the group on 3 March 1944, when they became the first Allied fighters to reach Berlin on an escort mission.

On 16 April 1944 the group moved to RAF Wormingford to accommodate the arrival of the 398th Bomb Group. The 55FG converted to North American P-51D Mustangs in July 1944, continuing their primary task of escorting B-17 and B-24 bombers that attacked such targets as industries and marshalling yards in Germany, and airfields and V-weapon sites in France. In July the group attacked gun emplacements during the Saint-Lô breakthrough in July 1944, and transportation facilities during the Battle of the Bulge, December 1944 – January 1945. The group also patrolled the air over the English Channel and bombed bridges in the Tours area during the invasion of the Continent in June 1944. The unit patrolled the Arnhem sector to support the airborne invasion of the Netherlands in September 1944 along with strafing trucks, locomotives, and oil depots near Wesel when the Allies crossed the Rhine in March 1945.

The unit received a Distinguished Unit Citation for eight missions to Germany between 3 and 13 September 1944 when the group not only destroyed enemy fighters in the air to protect the bombers it was escorting, but also descended to low levels, in spite of intense anti-aircraft fire, to strafe airfields and to destroy enemy aircraft on the ground. Received second DUC for operations on 19 February 1945 when the organization flew a sweep over Germany to hit railway tracks, locomotives, oil cars, goods wagons, troop cars, buildings, and military vehicles. The 55th Flew last combat mission on 21 April 1945.

The 55th Fighter Group moved to AAF Station Kaufbeuren Germany on 22 July 1945 as part of the occupation forces. It was assigned to United States Air Forces in Europe. While on occupation duty, the group was one of the units to receive the first U.S. operational jet fighter, the Lockheed P-80B Shooting Star in July 1946. However, the Group continued to fly P-51s and according to. one source, A-26s. On 29 April, the unit moved to AAF Station Giebelstadt, Germany, and on 20 August 1946, the unit was inactivated, the resources being transferred to the 31st Fighter Group.

With more than 600 combat missions, the group destroyed over 400 enemy aircraft while damaging more than 100. The 55th, inactivated in August 1946, had 16 aces credited with 90 victories.

=== Postwar era ===
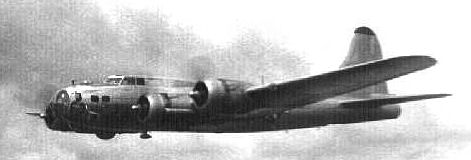
Unidentified RB-17G of the 55th Reconnaissance Group

On 24 February 1947, Strategic Air Command activated and redesignated the 55th Fighter Group as the 55th Reconnaissance group at MacDill Field, Florida, operating the RB-17. The newly activated group's mission consisted of aerial photography, mapping, charting, and photo reconnaissance missions, some of which flew around the globe. RB-17s were specifically used by the 55th RG to probe the borders of the Soviet Union, who had by then begun to emerge as a potential threat to the Western Powers. Little was known about the air defence capability of the Soviet Union at this time and the most effective way of determining their capability was to probe the borders and see whether they would respond. Gradually the RB-17s and other aircraft mapped the perimeter of the Soviet Air Defences from the Baltic to the Sea of Okhotsk, north of Japan.

The group then converted to RB-29s and transferred to Topeka (later Forbes) AFB, Kansas, in 1948, but was again inactivated in October 1949. On 1 November 1950, the 55th Strategic reconnaissance group was activated as a "paper organization" with the tactical squadrons attached directly to the 55th Strategic Reconnaissance wing. The wing was bestowed with the awards and honors of the 55th Reconnaissance Group and moved to Ramey AFB, Puerto Rico. In 1952 the group was again inactivated on 16 June 1952 as the Air Force reorganized its wings into the tri-deputate system.

=== Modern era ===
The group was reactivated in on 29 August 1991 as the 55th Operations Group and assigned to the 55th Wing. It was activated on 1 September 1991. The 55th OG was the operational component of the wing under the new "Objective Wing" concept adapted by the Air Force, and was bestowed the history and honors of the 55th 55 Strategic Reconnaissance Group. The 55th Operations Group activated with one of the largest and most diverse missions in the USAF.

The 24th Reconnaissance Squadron at Eareckson AFB, Shemya, Alaska, joined the group with its Cobra Eye and Cobra Ball missions.

On 1 April 1993, the 55th OG Wing took operational control of the 11th Airlift Flight. The 11 ALF flew operational airlift missions in support of the commander of the United States Strategic Command and transported high-ranking military, Department of Defense officials, and members of Congress. This unit has since inactivated and the mission has reverted to Air Mobility Command.

The 2 ACCS also inactivated in 1994 with its mission transferring to the 7th Airborne Command and Control Squadron. Likewise, the 24 RS inactivated in 1994 and its mission transferred to the newly activated 45th Reconnaissance Squadron. Also in 1994, the 1 ACCS National Emergency Airborne Command Post was renamed the National Airborne Operations Center to reflect the addition of a support role to the Federal Emergency Management Agency.

In October 1998, the 55th OG transferred control of the Boeing EC-135 Looking Glass mission to the United States Navy's E-6B Mercury TACAMO aircraft and the 7th Airborne Command and Control Squadron, which flew the Looking Glass aircraft, inactivated. In September 1999, the 338th Combat Training Squadron was activated and assigned to the 55th Operations Group.

Additionally, in March 2000, the group received its 16 RIVET JOINT aircraft. The group conducts operations from Offutt AFB, Nebraska; Kadena AB, Japan; RAF Mildenhall, United Kingdom; Souda Bay Naval Support Activity, Crete; and other locations around the world. The 55th OG is the largest Operations Group in Air Combat Command and the second largest in the Air Force.

Since the end of the Cold War, the 55th Operations Group has maintained an unmatched operational tempo, supporting every US contingency worldwide. These missions have included but were not limited to reconnaissance, command and control, and airlift missions supporting Operations SOUTHERN WATCH, PROVIDE COMFORT, VIGILANT WARRIOR (Southwest Asia), PROVIDE PROMISE, DENY FLIGHT (Bosnia-Herzegovina), SUPPORT DEMOCRACY, UPHOLD DEMOCRACY (Haiti), and TIGER RESCUE (Yemen). Additionally, its squadrons have been called upon to support Distinguished Visitor airlift for the National Command Authorities, the Federal Emergency Management Agency, and numerous exercises.

Beginning in January 2011, the unit has hosted training for flight and maintenance crews from No. 51 Squadron RAF in preparation for the delivery of the squadron's RC-135W Airseeker fleet.

On 7 October 2016, the E-4Bs under the 55th Wing moved to the USAF 8th Air Force.

=== Lineage ===
- Established as 55th Pursuit Group (Interceptor) on 20 November 1940

Activated on 15 January 1941
Redesignated: 55th Pursuit Group (Interceptor) (Twin Engine) on 31 January 1942
Redesignated: 55th Fighter Group (Twin Engine) on 15 May 1942
Redesignated: 55th Fighter Group, Twin Engine, on 1 March 1944
Redesignated: 55th Fighter Group, c. 19 July 1944
Inactivated on 20 August 1946, aircraft, personnel and equipment being redesignated as 31st Fighter Group.

- Redesignated 55th Reconnaissance Group (Very Long Range) (Mapping) on 5 February 1947

Activated on 24 February 1947
Redesignated 55th Strategic Reconnaissance Group on 29 June 1948
Inactivated on 14 October 1949

- Redesignated 55th Strategic Reconnaissance Group, Medium, on 27 October 1950

Activated on 1 November 1950
Inactivated on 16 June 1952

- Redesignated 55th Operations Group on 29 August 1991

Activated on 1 September 1991.

=== Assignments ===
- Northwest Air District (later, 2 Air Force), 15 January 1941
- II Interceptor Command, 2 October 1941
- 4 Air Force, 5 January 1942
- 4 Interceptor (later, IV Interceptor; IV Fighter) Command, 26 January 1942
  Attached to Seattle Air Defense Wing, 28 October 1942 – 11 April 1943
- Seattle Air Defense Wing, 12 April 1943
- Eighth Air Force, c. 14 September 1943
- VIII Fighter Command, 15 September 1943
- 66th Fighter Wing, 5 October 1943
  Attached to: 3d Bombardment (later Air) Division, 15 September 1944 – 20 July 1945
- XXIX Tactical Air Command, 20 July 1945
- 70th Fighter Wing, 6 August 1945 – 20 August 1946
- 311th Reconnaissance Wing (later, 311 Air Division, Reconnaissance), 24 February 1947
- 55th Strategic Reconnaissance Wing, 19 July 1948 – 14 October 1949
- 55th Strategic Reconnaissance Wing, 1 November 1950 – 16 June 1952
- 55th Wing, 1 September 1991 – present

=== Components ===
- 1st Airborne Command and Control Squadron: 1 September 1991 – 1 October 2016
- 2d Airborne Command and Control Squadron: 1 September 1991 – 19 July 1994
- 7th Airborne Command and Control Squadron: 19 July 1994 – 28 October 1998
- 24th Reconnaissance Squadron: 7 July 1992 – 30 June 1994
- 37th Pursuit (later, 37th Fighter): 15 January 1941 – 1 March 1943
- 38th Pursuit (later, 38th Fighter; 38th Reconnaissance; 38 Strategic Reconnaissance; 38 Reconnaissance): 15 January 1941 – 20 August 1946; 1 June – 14 October 1949; 1 November 1950 – 16 June 1952 (detached 1 November 1950 – 6 January 1951); 1 September 1991 – present
- 41st Electronic Combat Squadron: 1 October 2002 – 3 February 2003
- 43d Electronic Combat Squadron: 1 October 2002 – 3 February 2003
- 45th Reconnaissance Squadron: 1 July 1994 – present
- 54th Pursuit (later, 54th Fighter): 15 January 1941 – 11 September 1942 (Detached 31 May – 11 September 1941)
- 55th Intelligence Support Squadron: 22 July 2010 – present
- 82d Reconnaissance Squadron: 1 July 1992 – present
- 95th Reconnaissance Squadron: 1 July 1994 – present
- 338th Fighter (later, 338th Reconnaissance; 338th Strategic Reconnaissance; 338th Combat Training): 12 September 1942 – 20 August 1946; 1 June – 14 October 1949; 1 November 1950 – 16 June 1952 (detached 1 November – 1 December 1950); 20 September 1999 – present
- 343d Fighter (later, 343d Reconnaissance; 343d Strategic Reconnaissance; 343d Reconnaissance): 1 February 1943 – 20 August 1946; 24 February 1947 – 14 October 1949; 1 November 1950 – 16 June 1952 (detached 1 November 1950 – 3 January 1951); 1 September 1991 – present
- 922d Reconnaissance Squadron: 31 March – 1 June 1992; 1 July 1992 – 30 June 1994.

=== Stations ===
- Hamilton Field, California, 15 January 1941
- Portland Army Air Base, Oregon, 21 May 1941
- Paine Field, Washington, 10 February 1942
- McChord Field, Washington, 22 July 1942
- Camp Kilmer, New Jersey, 28 August – 4 September 1943
- RAF Nuthampstead (AAF-131), England, 14 September 1943
- RAF Wormingford (AAF-159), England, 16 April 1944
- AAF Station Kaufbeuren, Germany, 22 July 1945
- AAF Station Giebelstadt, Germany, 29 April – 20 August 1946
- MacDill Field (later, MacDill AFB), Florida, 24 February 1947
- Topeka (later, Forbes) AFB, Kansas, 30 June 1948 – 14 October 1949
- Ramey AFB, Puerto Rico, 1 November 1950 – 16 June 1952
- Offutt AFB, Nebraska, 1 September 1991 – present

=== Aircraft ===
- P-36 Hawk, 1941–1942
- P-38 Lightning, 1941–1944
- P-40 Warhawk, 1941–1942
- P-43 Lancer, 1941–1942
- P-51 Mustang, 1944–1946
- P-80 Shooting Star, 1946
- F-2 Expeditor, 1947–1949
- F-9 Flying Fortress, 1947–1948
- RC-54 Skymaster, 1948
- B/RB-17 Flying Fortress, 1947–1949
- B/RB-29 Superfortress, 1948–1949; 1950–1951
- RB-50 Superfortress, 1950–1952
- Boeing E-4, 1991–present
- C-135 Stratolifter, 1991–1994
- EC-135, 1991–1998
- KC-135 Stratotanker, 1991–present
- C-135, 1991–1994
- RC-135, 1991–present
- TC-135, 1991–present
- WC-135, 1992–present
- T-38 Talon, 1992–1995
- C-21, 1993–1997
- OC-135, 1994–present
- EC-130, 2002–2003
