= Giebelstadt Army Airfield =

- Giebelstadt Air Base; ALG Y-90 Giebelstadt; Fliegerhorst Giebelstadt
- Bavaria, Germany

Site information
- Type: Military airfield

Location
- Coordinates: 49°38′52″N 9°57′54″E

Site history
- Built: 1934
- Built by: Luftwaffe
- In use: 1935–1945 (Luftwaffe); 1945–1947 (United States Army Air Forces); 1947–1968 (United States Air Force); 1968–2006 (United States Army)

Giebelstadt Army Airfield is a closed military airfield located in Germany, southwest of Giebelstadt in Bavaria, approximately 250 miles southwest of Berlin. It was turned over to the German government on 23 June 2006 and is now Giebelstadt Airport, a general aviation airport.

Fliegerhorst Giebelstadt was one of the first Luftwaffe airfields, being established in 1935. During World War II, it was a reserve airfield in the rear area of Central Germany. Later, it was a key defensive airfield as part of the Defence of the Reich campaign where Messerschmitt Me 262 jet fighters assigned to the field intercepted Allied bombers attacking Germany.

After being captured by the United States Army in April 1945, it briefly became a combat airfield for the Ninth Air Force and was used by the United States Air Forces in Europe until 1968 in a variety of missions, from strategic reconnaissance to air defense interceptors. Turned over to the United States Army in 1968, it was the home of the Air Defense Artillery and many other units.

== History ==
=== Origins ===
The layout for Fliegerhorst Giebelstadt began in June 1934 with site reconnaissance, and land purchasing began shortly afterwards. Official construction began in the late summer under the code name Höhenflugzentrale Deutsche Verkehrsfliegerschule (Altitude Flight Central of the German Airline Pilot School). By January 1935 enough construction was completed for the airfield to open. It was, however, a school only in name because the restrictions of the Treaty of Versailles, which ended World War I, did not permit Germany to have a military air force.

In addition to the airfield construction, in the village of Giebelstadt, many housing units were built for both officers and enlisted men assigned to the airfield. Although the town was damaged significantly during World War II, many of these houses and barracks still exist and are in use as private homes and apartments.

The existence of the Luftwaffe was revealed by Germany on 3 January 1935, and Fliegerhorst Giebelstadt was one of its first operational airfields. It first consisted of a turf runway along with two paved launch platforms. The first operational flying unit assigned to Giebelstadt was Fliegergruppe Giebelstadt, activated at the base on 10 January 1935. Adolf Hitler officially opened the airfield after a review of the troops on 11 September 1936. Major General Albert Kesselring inspected the base in February 1937 and presented the unit with its colors. Later that year, the people of Giebelstadt held a festival on the airbase as part of the celebration commemorating the town's 1100th year of existence.

Fliegergruppe Giebelstadt was later redesignated as Kampfgeschwader 155 (KG 155) and was equipped with an early version of the Heinkel He 111 Bomber (He 111 B / E ). KG 155 moved to Austria following the Anschluss in 1938, being reassigned to Wiener Neustadt.

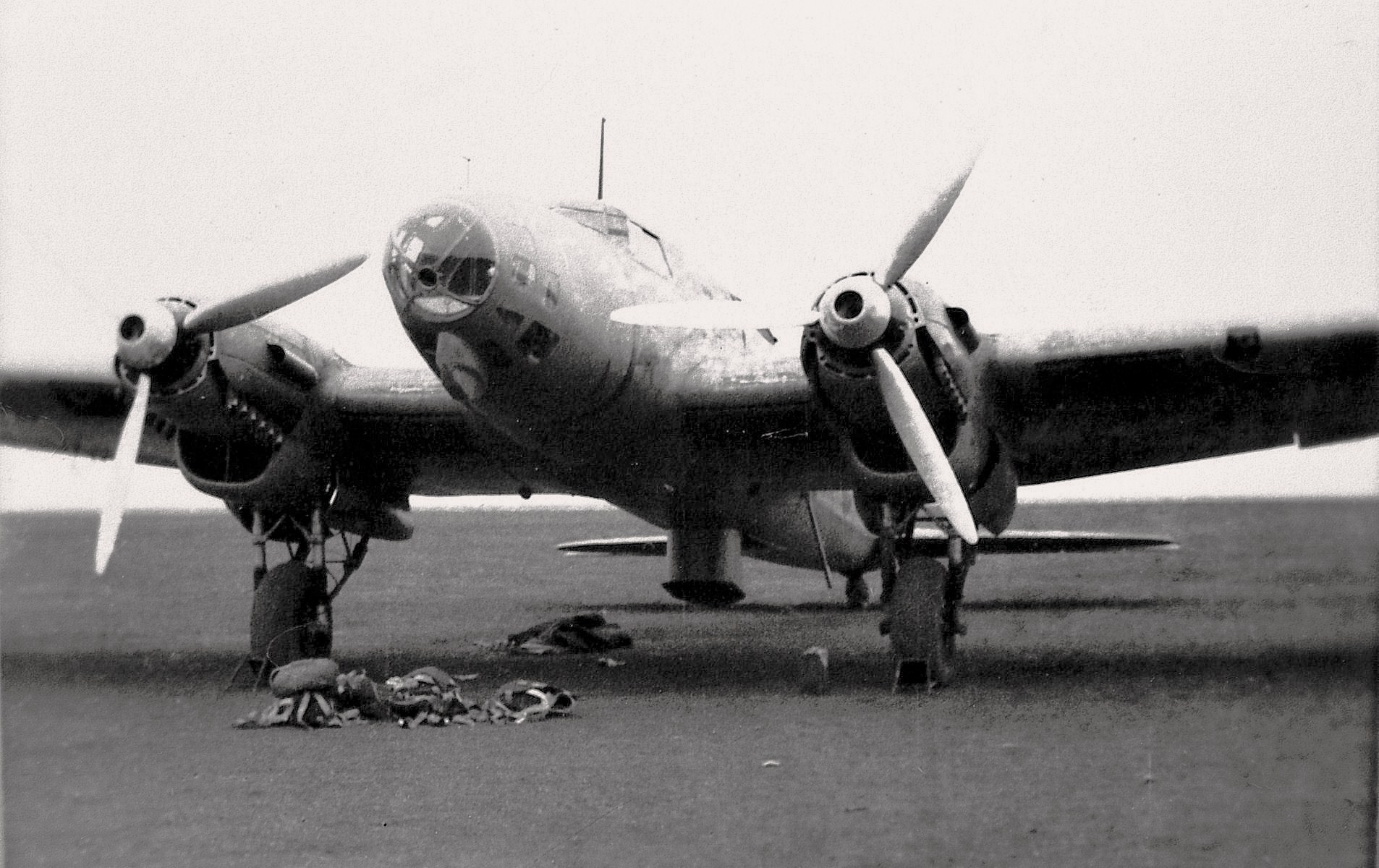
Heinkel He 111 B or E, introduced at Giebelstadt 1937-38

KG 155 was replaced by the formation of Kampfgeschwader 53 "Legion Condor" (KG 53) in January 1939, being equipped also with He 111s. The bomber unit remained until August 1939, when at the brink of World War II it was reassigned to Ansbach where it engaged in operations over Poland. During the "Phony War" with the British and French, Kampfgeschwader 2 (KG 2) was based there with Dornier Do 17Zs between February and March 1940.

=== Luftwaffe use during World War II ===
At the beginning of World War II, aircraft from Giebelstadt flew support missions in conjunction with the German Blitzkrieg, flying many missions against various targets in France. As the war moved away from Giebelstadt, the base became a training facility for pilots, observers and radio operators from 1939 until 1941. I/KG 76 used the airfield from October 1940 to April 1941 to upgrade from Do 17s to Junkers Ju 88As. III/KG 76 was stationed at the airfield during August/September 1941 and from April/May 1942, for rest and rearmament from duty in the Soviet Union. During 1943, Kampfgeschwader 100 (KG 100) moved in for R&R in May, exchanging He 111H's for newer Dornier Do 217E/K model bombers.

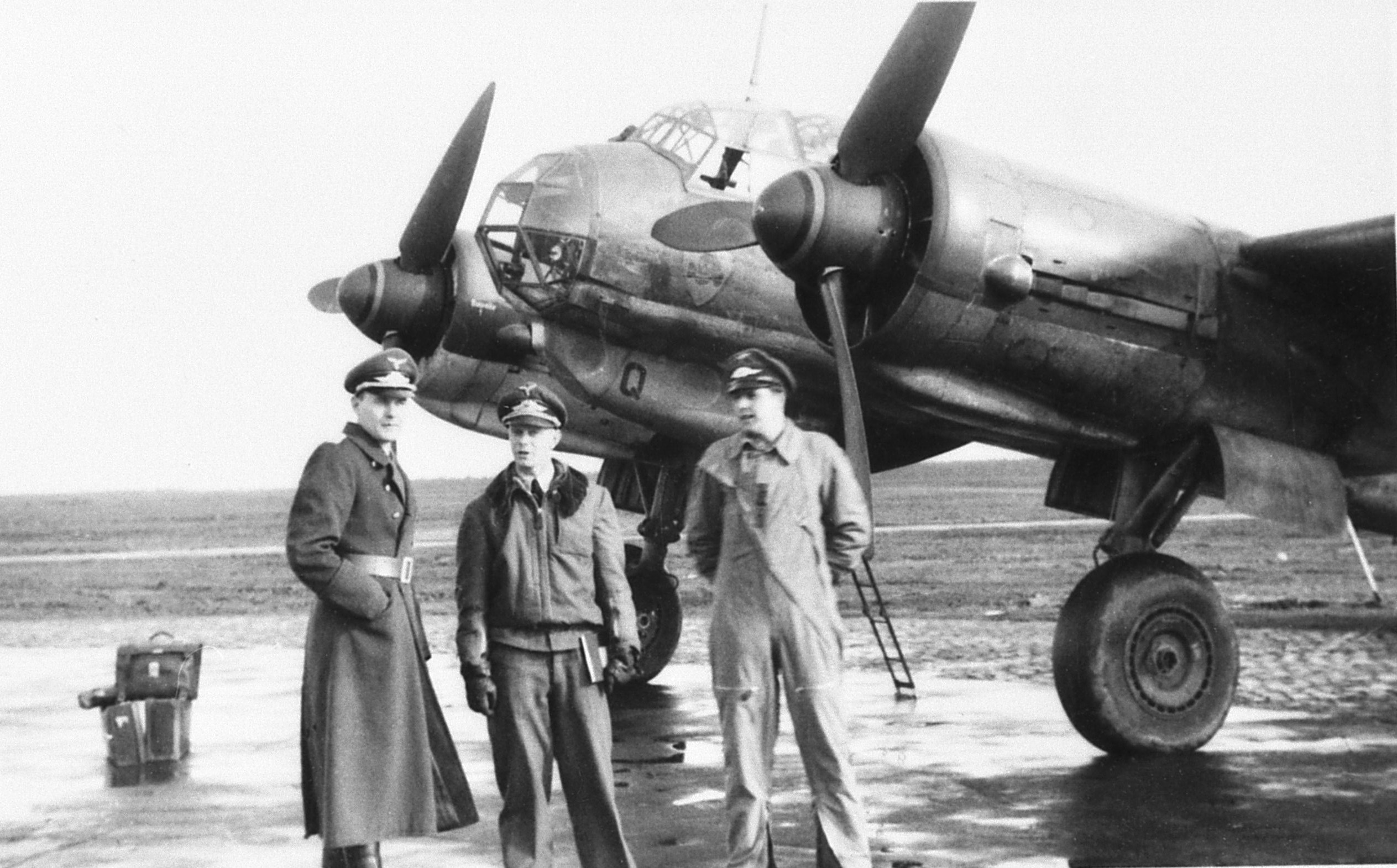
KG 54 - Junkers Ju 88 A-4, ca 1942

At first, the grass airfield was circular with planes taking off and landing into the wind, whichever direction that happened to be. Beginning in 1944, Giebelstadt received a very long (3000m 9,100 ft) paved runway aligned 08/26 slightly to the east and south of the original 1935 airfield. In addition, other upgrades to facilities were included in the plans for Giebelstadt to be used for jet interceptor aircraft operations such as additional aircraft dispersal sites, an expansion of the fuel dump and other facilities. This in turn made a significant extension of the airfield. With this construction, the expanded air base site was about 250ha in size. Not only was the location of the airbase a closely held secret, the town name itself was banned from all maps of the region and can still be hard to find on some maps today. To hide the airfield from Allied reconnaissance aircraft, workers painted the runway to resemble a grassy field complete with fluffy white sheep.

In April 1944, jet aircraft arrived at Giebelstadt with Kampfgeschwader 54 (KG 54) and the Messerschmitt Me 262 A. In addition, testing of the Messerschmitt Me 163A Rocket fighter took place. In March 1945, KG 54 was replaced by Kampfgeschwader 51 (KG 51) with newer model Me 262s, remaining until March 1945 when aircraft operation at the airfield became unsustainable.

The jet aircraft at Giebelstadt drew the attention of the USAAF Eighth Air Force, with no less than five heavy bomber attacks on the airfield between September 1944 and March 1945. In addition, as Giebelstadt came in range of Ninth Air Force Martin B-26 Marauder medium bombers and P-47 Thunderbolt fighter bombers in eastern France, attacks on the airfield by these tactical units with 500-pound General-Purpose bombs; unguided rockets and .50 caliber machine gun sweeps were frequent. These attacks would take place when Eighth Air Force heavy bombers (Boeing B-17 Flying Fortresses, Consolidated B-24 Liberators) were within interception range of the Luftwaffe jets assigned to the base, with the attacks being timed to have the maximum effect possible to keep the interceptors pinned down on the ground and be unable to attack the heavy bombers.

=== World War II USAAF use ===
At the end of March 1945, the 12th Armored Division captured Giebelstadt and its airfield shortly before the end of the war in Europe. The airfield had been heavily bombed and Soldiers of the United States Army's 12th Armored Division rolled into Giebelstadt capturing it unopposed. In the fields surrounding the base, the Army Soldiers found the burned out hulks of numerous bombers, night fighters and other military aircraft destroyed by the fleeing German forces, one of many across the former Reich.

On 5 April the IX Engineer Command 819th Engineer Aviation Battalion moved in and began patching the bomb craters of the airfield's concrete runway. Within a day the airfield was usable for Douglas C-47 Skytrain transports for combat resupply and casualty evacuation (S&E) use, with the airfield being designated as Advanced Landing Ground "Y-90 Giebelstadt". Combat units arrived on 20 April when the Republic P-47 Thunderbolt-equipped 50th Fighter Group began using the airfield, and the 417th Night Fighter Squadron arrived for night fighter defensive interceptor missions with Northrop P-61 Black Widow against any rogue Luftwaffe aircraft still in the skies.

=== Postwar USAF use ===
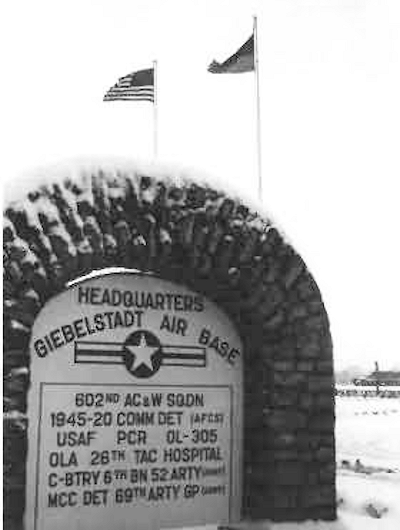
Entrance to Giebelstadt Air Base, early 1960s

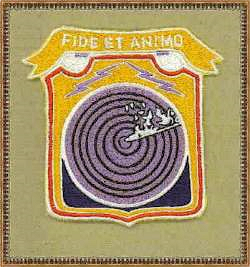
Emblem of the 603d Aircraft Control & Warning Squadron (Apr 1950 – Jul 1956)

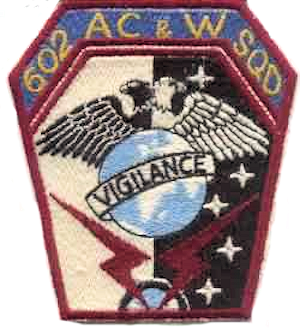
Emblem of the 602d Aircraft Control & Warning Squadron (Aug 1956 – Jul 1968)

With the end of combat in Germany on 7 May, the combat units were withdrawn and Giebelstadt became a garrison for the Army of Occupation, designated Army Air Force Station Giebelstadt. Repairing the damage to the airfield and the support area was performed, in large part, by German Prisoners of War, into 1946 and turning the airfield into a usable, long-term facility to be used by the Air Force. The last POW was released from Giebelstadt on 20 August 1946. Then, for nearly a decade after the war, Giebelstadt airfield was used periodically by the Air Force until it was made a permanent United States Air Forces in Europe airbase in 1956.

With the base and facilities undergoing repair, USAFE moved the 55th Fighter Group to Giebelstadt in April 1946 from Kaufbeuren Air Base, equipped first with P-47s, then, due to the long runway, upgraded the unit to Lockheed P-80 Shooting Star jet aircraft later in 1946. General Carl A "Tooey" Spaatz, Commanding General of the Army Air Forces, visited the base in July 1946, witnessing an aerial review of the newly acquired P-80 jet fighters. The 55th was inactivated in August due to budget reductions, the P-80s being reassigned to the incoming 31st Fighter Group which replaced the 55th. Giebelstadt was placed on "Standby" status due to budget reductions in September, with the 31st and its jets being moved to Kitzingen Air Base.

During 1947, with the airfield inactive, the war-damaged and repaired German jet runway was replaced with a new, 7,200' runway, and additional facilities were upgraded and brought into service. New hangars were constructed along with a large concrete parking apron, and in late 1947 was redesignated as Giebelstadt Air Base The new Strategic Air Command dispatched nine B-29 Superfortress very heavy bombers of the 97th Bombardment Group to Giebelstadt to conduct training during temporary deployments to Europe. The last SAC personnel returned to the United States in January 1948, and afterward the facility was closed and placed on standby status due to budget reductions in the postwar era.

The US Air Force returned in April 1950, when the 603rd Aircraft Control and Warning Squadron, stationed at Hof arrived at Giebelstadt AB as part of an Operational Readiness Test. In May they were placed on temporary status and finally in August 1950, Giebelstadt was made the home of the 603d, with the main mission of Giebelstadt becoming an Air Defense Radar Station, equipped with the Bendix AN/FPS-3.3A search RADAR. With the breakout of the Cold War, the usefulness of the airfield by the Air Force became limited, as Giebelstadt was simply too close to the East German border to station tactical aircraft. The flight time for jet aircraft from the border was less than 15 minutes, which meant little or no time was available to launch aircraft from the field before it coming under attack. The airfield, however, remained active as various MATS C-54 Skymaster transport units used the base during 1951–1952; then it was used by various transient transport aircraft throughout the 1950s and 1960s.

In January and February 1956, Giebelstadt Army Airfield was one of the two West German launch sites for Project Genetrix surveillance balloons, which were targeted to obtain aerial photographs over Eastern Europe and the Soviet Union.

In July 1956 the 603d ACW departed for Langerkopf Air Station, and the radar station was taken over by the 602d Aircraft Control and Warning Squadron, which moved in from Birkenfeld AS. With the arrival, Giebelstat was upgraded to the AN/FPS-20 General Surveillance Radar and the AN/FPS-6 Long-Range Height Finder Radar.

Starting in 1956 Central Intelligence Agency Lockheed U-2 reconnaissance aircraft flew from the airfield in support of operation AQUATONE/OILSTONE. Detachment "A", with four U-2 aircraft, arrived at Giebelstadt from Wiesbaden Air Base in October 1956, the reason being that U-2 operations from the relatively isolated Giebelstadt would draw much less attention than from Wiesbaden. Towards the end of the year, Detachment A flew U-2s three times over Albania, Bulgaria, Romania and Yugoslavia. The detachment was operational at Giebelstadt until 15 November 1957, when it was closed down, and U-2 operations were moved to Pakistan.

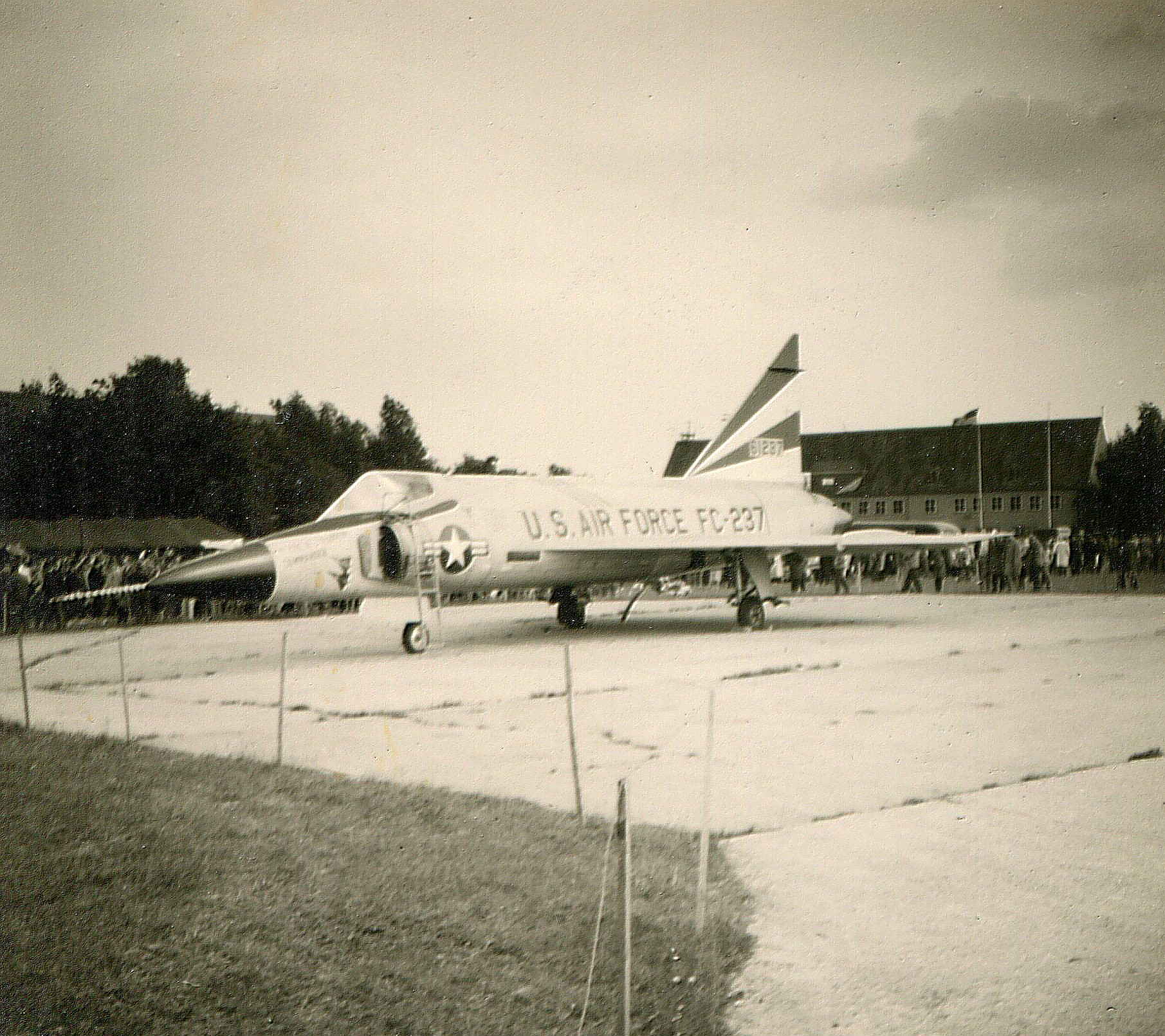
F-102A 'Delta Dagger', FC-237 of 526th FIS, LT COL R RANKIN COMMANDER, Giebelstadt AB, June 1961

During the 1960s, F-102 Delta Dagger interceptors of the 86th Air Division used the base frequently as a forward base from their home bases west of the Rhine. The departure of the F-102 from USAFE and budget reductions in the Air Force led to the departure of the 602nd ACW in July 1968. Giebelstadt Air Base and all of its facilities were transferred to United States Army control in August 1968.

=== United States Army use ===
Many Army units came and went over the years, but in recent time the airfield hosted the 4th Brigade of the 3rd Infantry Division (Mechanized) flying mostly AH-1 Cobra attack helicopters, UH-1 Huey and UH-60 Blackhawk transport helicopters. The 4th Brigade left Giebelstadt in early 1992, replaced by AH-64 Apache attack helicopters of the 2nd Battalion, 3rd Aviation Regiment, and UH-60 Blackhawk and OH-58 Kiowas of the 12th Aviation Brigade. Air Defense Artillery (ADA) continued to play a major role on the airfield with the presence of "C" Battery of the 6th Battalion, 52nd ADA Regiment, with its Hawk missile batteries and the senior officer on post commanding the 69th ADA Brigade. In 1993, the Apache helicopter and Hawk ADA units deactivated and a CH-47 Chinook company (A Co. 5–159th Aviation Regiment – "Big Windy") arrived from Schwaebisch Hall Army Airfield. In 1994, the OH-58 Kiowa units disbanded as the aircraft returned to the states for conversion to armed OH-58 Kiowa Warriors.

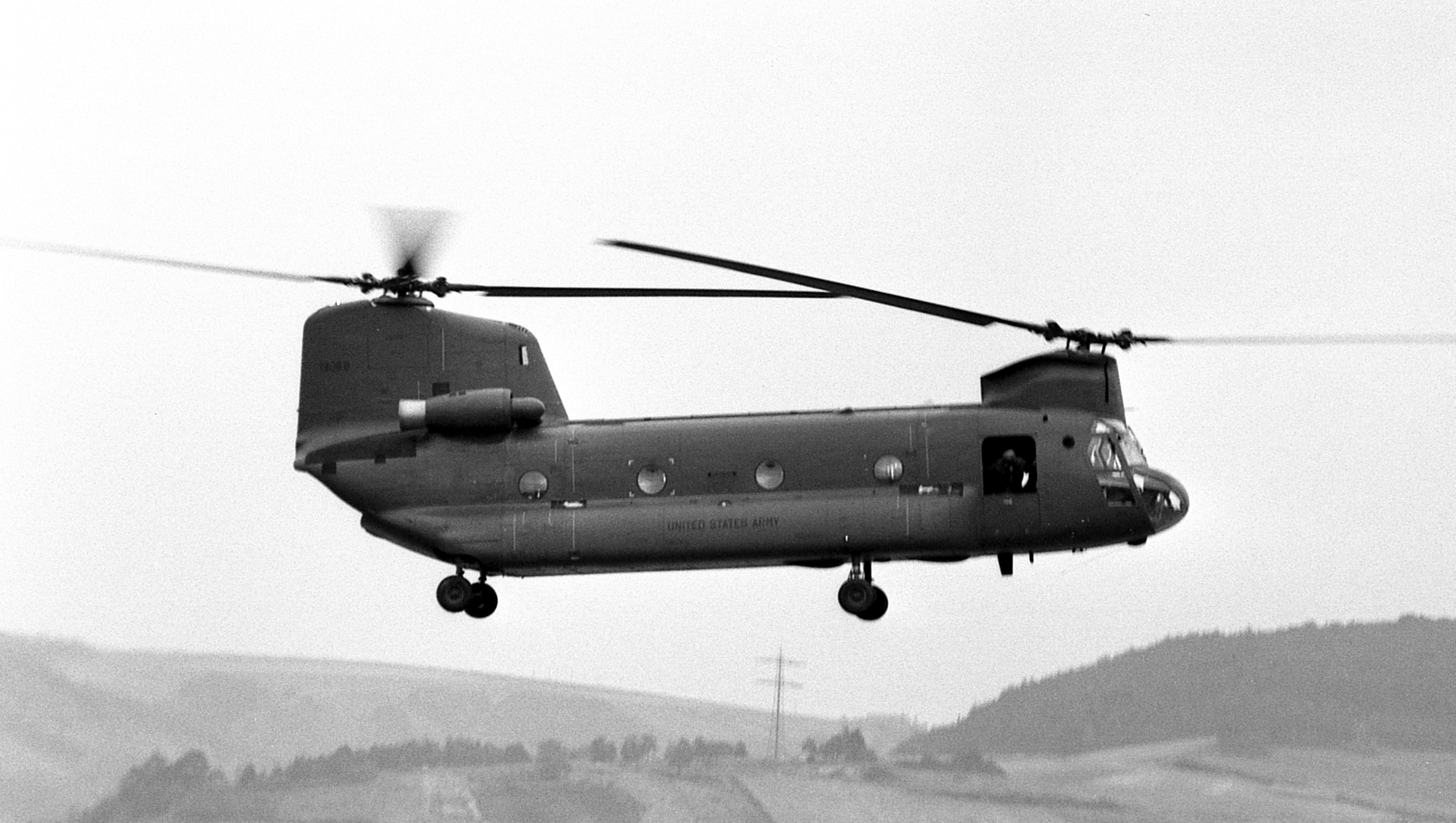
US Army CH-47C 'Chinook' - 180. Aviation, later A Company / 5. Battalion / 159. Aviation Regiment; photo in Lauda (Germany) Sept 1973

Also in 1994, tragedy struck the Giebelstadt military community in April when two Blackhawk helicopters of the 5th Battalion, 158th Aviation Regiment, assigned to Giebelstadt were mistakenly shot down by USAF F-15's over Iraq. All 26 people were killed, including eight Giebelstadt crew members.

In 1995, the primary units on Giebelstadt Army Airfield were: the 69th ADA Brigade, the 5th Battalion, 158th Aviation Regiment (UH-60s); A Company, 5th Battalion, 159th Aviation Regiment (Big Windy CH-47s); C Company 6th Battalion, 159th Aviation Regiment (War Eagles UH-60s); C Company 7th Battalion 158th Aviation Regiment (Blue Stars UH-60s) and B Company, 7th Battalion, 159th Aviation Regiment (Third Corps Support Command aircraft maintenance). US Air Force units on Giebelstadt AAF were Det. 10, 617th Weather Squadron, providing weather support for the airfield and to the 3rd Infantry Division (Mechanized) headquartered in Wuerzburg; and OL-C, 617th Comm Squadron, providing maintenance support for meteorological and navigation equipment in the area.

The Department of Defense announced on 29 July 2005 plans for the return of eleven Army bases to Germany in fiscal year 2007. These installation returns were scheduled as part of plans for the 1st Infantry Division headquarters' return to the United States with its divisional flag in the summer of 2006.

As part of this redeployment, Giebelstadt Army Airfield was closed by the United States Army on 23 June 2006.

=== Current use ===
After being turned over to the German government in 2006, Giebelstadt Airfield has become a commercial airport (ICAO: EDQG) used by general aviation aircraft.

Due to the frequent wartime bombing attacks, much of the wartime airfield was destroyed. Almost all of the buildings on the airfield are of postwar vintage, although the modern buildings are constructed in a traditional German style. In the town of Giebelstadt, many of the buildings used for personnel barracks and housing still exist and still are being used. The original circular airfield still exists, in part, and some wartime concrete hardstands remain. A pre-war Luftwaffe hangar which was repaired remains to the west side of the original airfield, connected to an enclosing taxiway and some aircraft parking hardstands. The 1944 extension with the extended length jet runway remains, with the taxiways and hardstands for Me 262 use remaining. The runway, reduced in length in 1947 still has part of its wartime concrete remaining between the Bundesstraße 19 (B 19) highway and the current runway 20 (west) end. Remains of the original B 19 highway, which was cut in 1944 when the jet runway was built, still remain to the south of the airfield, today being a single lane farm road running north–south that intersects the airfield about midway between the runway ends. In the neighboring town of Wolkshausen, south of the airfield, the old B 19 is still known as Giebelstadter Straße.

== See also ==
- Advanced Landing Ground#Y-72 to Y-99
