= List of active United States military aircraft =

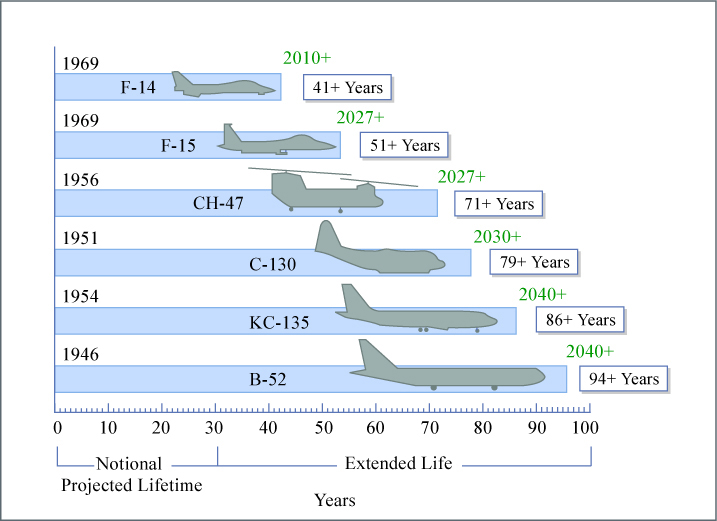
Lifecycles of U.S. aircraft weapon systems showing notional projected lifetime and extended life.

The United States Armed Forces uses a wide variety of military aircraft across the respective aviation arms of its various service branches. The numbers of specific aircraft listed in the following entries are estimates from published sources and may not be exhaustive.

== Air Force ==
Aircraft are listed in the table below alphabetically by the 1962 United States Tri-Service aircraft designation system "Basic Mission" or "Vehicle Type" code (ignoring preceding "Modified Mission" or "Status Prefix" codes), then serially by "Design number", then alphabetically by "Series letter" and lastly alphabetically by "Modified Mission" or "Status Prefix" code when applicable. Aircraft without a 1962 Tri-Service designation system designation are listed alphabetically at the end of the table.

Aircraft	Manufacturer	Origin	Propulsion	Role	Control	Introduced/IOC	Inventory	Notes
OA-1K Skyraider II	L3Harris	USA	Propeller	CAS / Attack	Manned	2025	8	SOF support
A-10C Thunderbolt II	Fairchild Republic	USA	Jet	CAS / Attack	Manned	2007 (A-10C)	162	The Air Force is seeking to retire all A-10s in FY2026.
A-29C Super Tucano	Sierra Nevada Corporation	Brazil	Propeller	Research and development	Manned	2003	3	Delivered to Air Force Special Operations Command in 2021. Transferred to the U.S. Air Force Test Pilot School in 2024.
EA-37B Compass Call	Gulfstream	USA	Jet	Radar jamming / PSYOP	Manned	2026	1	2 ordered Replacement for EC-130H Compass Call. 10 planned.
B-1 Lancer	Rockwell International	USA	Jet	Bomber	Manned	1986	40	Long-range conventional bomber. Employs variable-sweep wing design. To be replaced by the B-21 Raider around 2032. The Air Force is seeking to divest one B-1 in FY2026.
B-2 Spirit	Northrop Grumman	USA	Jet	Bomber	Manned	1997	20	Stealth long-range nuclear-capable heavy bomber. To be replaced by the B-21 Raider around 2032. One aircraft to be divested in FY2025.
B-21 Raider	Northrop Grumman	USA	Jet	Bomber	Optionally piloted		3	Stealth long-range nuclear-capable heavy bomber. The first B-21 test aircraft made its maiden flight in November 2023. To replace the B-2 Spirit and B-1 Lancer around 2032.
B-52H Stratofortress	Boeing	USA	Jet	Bomber	Manned	1961 (B-52H)	72	Currently undergoing re-engining. Expected to serve into the 2050s. One aircraft crashed on 15 June 2026.
C-5M Super Galaxy	Lockheed	USA	Jet	Strategic airlifter	Manned	2014 (C-5M)	52	
C-12C/D/F/J Huron	Beechcraft	USA	Propeller	Transport	Manned	c. 1974	29	
C-17A Globemaster III	McDonnell Douglas/Boeing	USA	Jet	Strategic airlifter	Manned	1995	219	These were produced by McDonnell-Douglas prior to the merger with Boeing.
C-21A Learjet 35	Learjet	USA	Jet	VIP transport	Manned	1984	19	
VC-25A	Boeing	USA	Jet	Presidential transport	Manned	1990	2	
C-32A/B Air Force Two	Boeing	USA	Jet	VIP transport	Manned	1998	4/2	
C-37A/B Gulfstream V	Gulfstream	USA	Jet	VIP transport	Manned	1998	9/7	VIP transport. 16 planned.
C-40B/C	Boeing	USA	Jet	VIP transport	Manned	2003	4/7	
KC-46A Pegasus	Boeing	USA	Jet	Aerial refueling	Manned	FY24 (planned)	77	179 planned.
C-130H Hercules	Lockheed Martin	USA	Propeller	Tactical airlifter	Manned	c. 1974	126	The C-130J is replacing the C-130H on a one-for-one basis. The Air Force has Congressionally mandated floor of 271 C-130 aircraft. The Air Force is seeking to divest 14 C-130Hs in FY2026.
LC-130H Hercules	Lockheed Martin	USA	Propeller	Cargo aircraft	Manned	c. 1984	10	Assigned to 109th Airlift Wing
C-130J Super Hercules/J-30 Super Hercules	Lockheed Martin	USA	Propeller	Tactical airlifter	Manned	2006	151	
AC-130J Ghostrider	Lockheed Martin	USA	Propeller	CAS / Attack	Manned	2017 (AC-130J)	31	Final aircraft delivered in 2022.
HC-130J Combat King II	Lockheed Martin	USA	Propeller	Search and rescue	Manned	2013	39	
MC-130J Commando II	Lockheed Martin	USA	Propeller	Multi-mission/Special Operations	Manned	2012	57	64 planned.
WC-130J Hercules	Lockheed Martin	USA	Propeller	Weather reconnaissance	Manned	2006	10	Assigned to 403d Wing
WC-135R Constant Phoenix	Boeing	USA	Jet	Atmospheric research	Manned	2022 (WC-135R)	3	
KC-135R/T Stratotanker	Boeing	USA	Jet	Aerial refueling	Manned	1957	376	The Air Force is seeking to divest 14 KC-135 in FY2026.
TC-135S/W	Boeing	USA	Jet	Trainer	Manned	1961	3	
RC-135S/U/V/W Cobra Ball/Combat Sent/Rivet Joint	Boeing	USA	Jet	Reconnaissance / ELINT / surveillance	Manned	1972	25	
C-146A Wolfhound	Fairchild-Dornier	Germany	Propeller	Transport	Manned	c. 2011	20	Delivered 2011–2017. Flown with the 524th Special Operations Squadron
C-147A	De Havilland Canada	Canada	Propeller	Transport	Manned			For the U.S. Army Parachute Team
E-3B/G Sentry (AWACS)	Boeing	USA	Jet	AWACS	Manned	1977; 2014 (Block 40/45)	15	To be replaced by the E-2D Hawkeye.
E-4B (NAOC)	Boeing	USA	Jet	Command and control	Manned	1978 (E-4B)	4	Assigned to the 595th Command and Control Group. To be replaced by the Survivable Airborne Operations Center.
E-9A Widget	De Havilland Canada	Canada	Propeller	Surveillance	Manned	1988	2	Military surveillance version of the DHC-8-100, used for missile range control.
E-11A (BACN)	Northrop Grumman	USA / Canada	Jet	Command and control / BACN	Manned	c. 2011	5	2 aircraft to be divested in FY2025. Nine planned.
F-15C/D Eagle	McDonnell Douglas	USA	Jet	Air superiority	Manned	1979 (F-15C/D)	108	F-15C retired from active service in 2025. 12 D variants are used for training. The Air Force is seeking to divest 13 F-15C and Ds s in FY2026.
F-15E Strike Eagle	McDonnell Douglas/Boeing	USA	Jet	Multirole, primarily strike	Manned	1989	218	The Air Force is seeking to divest 21 F-15Es FY2026.
F-15EX Eagle II	Boeing	USA	Jet	Multirole, primarily strike	Manned	2024 (planned)	8	F-15C/D Eagle replacement. 267 planned.
QF-16A/C	Boeing	USA	Jet	Target drone	Optionally piloted	2016	73	Conversion of an F-16 Fighting Falcon to full-scale aerial target. Final deliveries will take place 2024–2025. 126 planned.
F-16C/D Fighting Falcon	General Dynamics	USA	Jet	Multirole	Manned	1981 (Block 25-32); 1989 (Block 40/42); 1994 (Block 50/52)	762	The Air Force is seeking to divest 62 F-16C/Ds in FY2026.
F-22A Raptor	Lockheed Martin	USA	Jet	Air superiority	Manned	2005	183	Stealth aircraft. To be succeeded by the F-47.
F-35A Lightning II	Lockheed Martin	USA	Jet	Multirole	Manned	2016	302	7 on order 1,763 planned.
F-117 Nighthawk	Lockheed	USA	Jet	Aggressor aircraft/research and development	Manned	1983	4	Although officially retired in 2008, the aircraft has been involved in various exercises beginning around 2020. The Air Force possesses 45 F-117s, some in flyable condition, As of 2023. The Air Force plans to operate the type through 2034.
TG-15A			Glider	Trainer	Manned		2	
TG-15B			Glider	Trainer	Manned		3	
TG-16A			Glider	Trainer	Manned		19	
TG-17A			Glider	Trainer	Manned		1	MDM MDM-1 Fox donated to the 94th Flying Training Squadron.
TH-1H Iroquois	Bell	USA	Helicopter	Trainer	Manned	c. 2009	28	Light lift training helicopter To be replaced by the MH-139A.
UH-1N Twin Huey/UH-1N Operational Support Airlift	Bell	USA	Helicopter	Utility	Manned	1970	63	Light lift helicopter. To be replaced by the MH-139 Grey Wolf. The Air Force is seeking to divest 4 UH-1Ns in FY2026.
HH-60G/U Pave Hawk	Sikorsky	USA	Helicopter	CSAR	Manned	1982	64	To be replaced by the HH-60W Jolly Green II.The Air Force is seeking to divest 11 HH-60G in FY2026.
HH-60W Jolly Green II	Sikorsky	USA	Helicopter	CSAR	Manned	2022	32	To replace the HH-60G/U Pave Hawk. 85 planned.
MH-139A Grey Wolf	AgustaWestland		Helicopter	Utility	Manned	2023 (planned)	7	6 test aircraft and 1 production aircraft have been delivered. 20 on order. 42 planned.
P-9A Pale Ale	Bombardier	Canada	Propeller	Maritime patrol	Manned		4	Government-owned contractor-operated fleet tasked with monitoring drug trafficking.
RQ-4B Global Hawk	Northrop Grumman	USA	Jet	ISTAR	Unmanned	2011 (Block 30), 2016 (Block 40)	9	
MQ-9A Reaper	General Atomics	USA	Propeller	Multi-mission	Unmanned	2007, 2015 (ER)	55	
RQ-20 Puma	AeroVironment	USA	Propeller	Patrol	Unmanned	2008		
RQ-170 Sentinel	Lockheed Martin	USA	Jet	Multi-Mission	Unmanned	2007		
T-1A Jayhawk	Raytheon	USA	Jet	Trainer	Manned	1993	127	Multi-engine trainer. The Air Force is seeking to divest 35 T-1s in FY2026.
T-6A Texan II	Raytheon/Beechcraft	USA	Propeller	Trainer	Manned	2000	442	
T-7 Red Hawk	Boeing / Saab	USA	Jet	Trainer	Manned	2028 (planned)	2	Replacement for the T-38 Talon. The first five test aircraft will be production representative. 351 planned.
T-38A/C/AT-38B Talon	Northrop	USA	Jet	Trainer	Manned	1961	495	To be replaced by the T-7A. The Air Force is seeking to divest 17 T-38A/Cs in FY2026.
T-41D Mescalero	Cessna	USA	Propeller	Basic trainer	Manned	1964	4	
T-51A Cessna	Cessna	USA	Propeller	Basic trainer	Manned	1957	3	
T-53A Kadet II	Cirrus	USA	Propeller	Basic trainer	Manned	1995	24	USAFA flight training aircraft
U-2S Dragon Lady	Lockheed	USA	Jet	Reconnaissance	Manned	c. 1981 (U-2R)	27	The Air Force plans to divest all U-2s and TU-2s in FY2027.
TU-2S Dragon Lady	Lockheed	USA	Jet	Conversion trainer	Manned		4	The Air Force is seeking to divest all U-2s and TU-2s in FY2027.
U-28A Draco/PC-12	Pilatus	Switzerland	Propeller	Utility	Manned	1991	30 U-28A/5 PC-12	PC-12 used for training. Used by SOCOM for reconnaissance. To be replaced in SOCOM by the OA-1K Sky Warden.
UV-18B Twin Otter	De Havilland Canada	Canada	Propeller	Utility	Manned	1988	3	USAFA parachute training aircraft
CV-22B Osprey	Bell, Boeing	USA	Tiltrotor	CSAR / transport	Manned	2006	52	2 on order. Two aging CV-22Bs will be divested in FY2025 and be replaced with new aircraft.
X-62 VISTA	General Dynamics	USA	Jet	In-flight simulator	Optionally piloted	1992	1	A highly modified version of the F-16D incorporating artificial intelligence used by the U.S. Air Force Test Pilot School
BQM-167 Skeeter	Composite Engineering		Jet	Target drone	Unmanned	2008	37	Subscale aerial target. 800+ planned.
CN-235	CASA	Spain	Propeller	Reconnaissance	Manned	1988	5	Flown with the 427th Special Operations Squadron
Dzyne ULTRA	DZYNE Technologies	USA	Propeller	Surveillance	Unmanned	c. 2024		

== Army ==
Aircraft are listed in the table below alphabetically by the 1962 United States Tri-Service aircraft designation system "Basic Mission" or "Vehicle Type" code (ignoring preceding "Modified Mission" or "Status Prefix" codes), then serially by "Design number", then alphabetically by "Series letter" and lastly alphabetically by "Modified Mission" or "Status Prefix" code when applicable. Aircraft without a 1962 Tri-Service designation system designation are listed alphabetically at the end of the table.

Type	Manufacturer	Origin	Propulsion	Role	Control	Introduced	Inventory	Notes
C-12D/R/U/V Huron	Beechcraft	USA	Propeller	Cargo/Transport	Manned	1972	95	
MC/RC-12D/H/K	Beechcraft	USA	Propeller	Reconnaissance	Manned	1974	95	RC-12D, RC-12H and RC-12K. Retired at 11 December 2025
C-12J	Beechcraft	USA	Propeller	Transport	Manned	1984	3	
C-20H	Gulfstream	USA	Jet	VIP Transport	Manned	1985	1	
C-26E Metroliner	Fairchild	USA	Propeller	Cargo/Transport	Manned	1980s	13	
C-27J Spartan	Alenia Aeronautica	USA; Italy	Propeller	Cargo aircraft	Manned	2006	7	Former Air Force aircraft used by Army Special Operations Command for training.
UC-35	Cessna	USA	Jet	Utility aircraft	Manned	1987	27	20 x UC-35A, 7 x UC-35B
C-37	Gulfstream	USA	Jet	VIP Transport	Manned	1997	3	1 x C-37B (G550)(04-1778), 2 x C-37A (G500)(02-1863, 05–1944)
C-41 Aviocar	CASA	Spain	Propeller	Cargo/Transport	Manned	1974	5	
AH/MH-6M Little Bird	MD Helicopter	USA	Helicopter	Attack	Manned	1980	43	
MH-47D/E/G Chinook	Boeing	USA	Helicopter	Multi-mission	Manned	1962	61	11 x MH-47D, 23 x MH-47E, 27 x MH-47G
CH-47D/F Chinook	Boeing	USA	Helicopter	Transport	Manned	1962	510 (figure includes MH-47G)	30 on order (figure includes MH47G)
EH-60A Black Hawk	Sikorsky	USA	Helicopter	Electronic-warfare	Manned	1979	64	
UH-60A/L/M Black Hawk	Sikorsky	USA	Helicopter	Utility	Manned	1979	1,443	751 x UH-60A, 592 x UH-60L, 100 x UH-60M. 1227 UH-60M planned. UH-60A and UH-60L models being upgraded and converted UH-60V. To be replaced by Future Long-Range Assault Aircraft.
MH-60K/L Black Hawk	Sikorsky	USA	Helicopter	Multi-mission	Manned	1979	58	23 x MH-60K, 35 x MH-60L
AH-64D/E Apache Longbow, Guardian	Boeing	USA	Helicopter	Attack	Manned	1986	824	15 on order.
UH-72A/B Lakota	Eurocopter	USA; Germany	Helicopter	Utility	Manned	2007	478	30 on order.
MQ-1C Gray Eagle	General Atomics	USA	Propeller		Unmanned	2009	75	133 planned
CQ-10 Snowgoose	MMIST	Canada	Propeller	Transport	Unmanned	2005	15	49 planned. Parafoil and autogyro variants.
RQ-11 Raven	AeroVironment	USA	Propeller		Unmanned	2003		
RQ-20 Puma	AeroVironment	USA	Propeller	Patrol	Unmanned	2008		
T-6D Texan II		USA	Propeller	Trainer	Manned	2015	4	
UV-18C	de Havilland Canada	Canada	Propeller	Cargo/Transport	Manned	1965	3	Used for the Golden Knights Gold Team
Black Hornet Nano	Teledyne FLIR	USA	Propeller	Surveillance	Unmanned			Unmanned pocket-sized drone
CL-650 (ARTEMIS)	Bombardier	Canada	Jet	Intelligence, Surveillance and Reconnaissance	Manned	2020	2	Modified CL-650; N488CR c/n 6140, N159L c/n 6159
Mil Mi-8/Mi-17	Mil Moscow Helicopter Plant	Russia	Helicopter		Manned		10	
Mil Mi-24	Mil Moscow Helicopter Plant	Russia	Helicopter		Manned		1	
Prioria Robotics Maveric	Prioria Robotics	USA	Propeller		Unmanned	2008	36	

== Coast Guard ==
Aircraft are listed in the table below alphabetically by the 1962 United States Tri-Service aircraft designation system "Basic Mission" or "Vehicle Type" code (ignoring preceding "Modified Mission" or "Status Prefix" codes), then serially by "Design number", then alphabetically by "Series letter".

Type	Manufacturer	Origin	Propulsion	Role	Control	Introduced	Inventory	Notes
HC-27J Spartan	Alenia Aeronautica	USA; Italy	Propeller	Medium Range Surveillance	Manned	2014	14	Former Air Force aircraft, 13 acquired in 2014, one in 2017
C-37A Gulfstream V	Gulfstream	USA	Jet	Long Range Command & Control	Manned	2002	1	Long Range Command and Control aircraft (VIP transport) for high-ranking members of the Department of Homeland Security and U.S. Coast Guard.
C-37B Gulfstream 550	Gulfstream	USA	Jet	Long Range Command & Control	Manned	2022	1	Long Range Command and Control aircraft (VIP transport) for high-ranking members of the Department of Homeland Security and U.S. Coast Guard.
HC-130J Hercules	Lockheed Martin	USA	Propeller	Long Range Surveillance	Manned	2003	17	Projected inventory 22
HC-144B Ocean Sentry	Airbus	USA; Spain	Propeller	Medium Range Surveillance	Manned	2007	18	HC-144A upgraded with Minotaur advanced navigation and search and rescue system common to HC-144B, HC-130J, HC-27J
MH-60T Jayhawk	Sikorsky	USA	Helicopter	Medium Range Recovery (MRR)	Manned	1990	45	Projected inventory up to 127 as USCG moves to an all MH-60T helicopter fleet by early 2040s
MH-65E Dolphin	Eurocopter	USA; France	Helicopter	Short Range Recovery (SRR)	Manned	1984	90	Final MH-65D to MH-65E upgrade completed 19 August 2024
MQ-9A Reaper	General Atomics	USA	Propeller	Intelligence Surveillance and Reconnaissance	Unmanned			USCG to procure up to four MQ-9As using FY25 funding

- "In service" sources:

== Marine Corps ==
Aircraft are listed in the table below alphabetically by the 1962 United States Tri-Service aircraft designation system "Basic Mission" or "Vehicle Type" code (ignoring preceding "Modified Mission" or "Status Prefix" codes), then serially by "Design number", then alphabetically by "Series letter" and lastly alphabetically by "Modified Mission" or "Status Prefix" code when applicable. Aircraft without a 1962 Tri-Service designation system designation are listed alphabetically at the end of the table

Type	Manufacturer	Origin	Propulsion	Role	Control	Introduced	In service	Total	Notes
(Note: Originally, the Navy planned to have two variants of the Hornet: the F-18 fighter and A-18 light attack aircraft. During development, "F/A-18" was used as a shorthand to refer to both variants. When the Navy decided to develop a single aircraft able to perform both missions, the "F/A" appellation stuck despite the designation system not allowing for slashes or other characters.)F/A-18C Hornet	McDonnell Douglas	USA	Jet	Carrier-based Strike Fighter	Manned	1983	186		Being replaced by F-35B/C Lightning II
UC-12F Huron	Beechcraft	USA	Propeller	Utility	Manned	1986	4		Planned to be replaced by UC-12W Huron by 2032
UC-12M Huron	Beechcraft	USA	Propeller	Utility	Manned	1987	2		Planned to be replaced by UC-12W Huron by 2026
UC-12W Huron	Beechcraft	USA	Propeller	Utility	Manned	2010	9		Planned to replace the UC-12F/M Huron and UC-35D
C-20G Grey Ghost	Gulfstream	USA	Jet	Cargo/Transport	Manned	1994	1		Will be upgraded to C-20 ER
UC-35D Citation	Cessna	USA	Jet	Utility	Manned	2001	10		Planned to be replaced by UC-12W Huron by 2030
C-40A Clipper	Boeing	USA	Jet	Cargo/Transport	Manned	2023	2		
KC-130J Super Hercules	Lockheed Martin	USA	Propeller	Aerial refueling	Manned	2004	69		
F-5F/N Tiger II	Northrop	USA	Jet	Aggressor	Manned	1974	12		Scheduled to maintain service till 2026.
F-35B Lightning II	Lockheed Martin	USA	Jet	Amphibious Assault Ship-based Strike Fighter	Manned	2015	112		F-35B V/STOL variant. Planned total of 280 F-35Bs to replace F/A-18 and AV-8B.
F-35C Lightning II	Lockheed Martin	USA	Jet	Carrier-based Strike Fighter	Manned	2020	112		F-35C carrier variant Planned total of 140 F-35Cs (CTOL) to replace F/A-18.
UH-1Y Venom	Bell	USA	Helicopter	Utility	Manned	2008	160		
AH-1Z Viper	Bell	USA	Helicopter	Close air support	Manned	2011	189		The Marine Corps plans to divest 10 AH-1Z in FY2025.
VH-3D Sea King	Sikorsky	USA	Helicopter	Marine One VIP Transport	Manned	1974	11		To be replaced by Sikorsky VH-92A. 2 to be divested in FY2025.
CH-53E Super Stallion	Sikorsky	USA	Helicopter	Cargo/Transport	Manned	1981	133		96 Active, 6 Reserve, 10 Training. To be replaced by CH-53K King Stallion
CH-53K King Stallion	Sikorsky	USA	Helicopter	Cargo/Transport	Manned	2022	11		Projected inventory 200
VH-60N Whitehawk	Sikorsky	USA	Helicopter	Marine One VIP Transport	Manned	1980s	6		To be replaced by Sikorsky VH-92A
VH-92A Patriot	Sikorsky Aircraft	USA	Helicopter	Marine One VIP Transport	Manned	2021	23		
MQ-9A Reaper	General Atomics	USA	Propeller	Intelligence Surveillance and Reconnaissance	Unmanned	2021	20		
RQ-20 Puma	AeroVironment	USA	Propeller	Reconnaissance	Unmanned	2012			
CQ-24A; K-MAX	Kaman	USA	Helicopter	Technology development	Unmanned	2011	2		Helicopter with twin intermeshing rotors. UAV variant of manned type.
T-34C Turbo Mentor	Beechcraft	USA	Propeller	Miscellaneous support	Manned		2		The T-34 was replaced by the T-6 as the Navy/Marine Corps/Coast Guard primary trainer. A few are retained by the USN and USMC in miscellaneous support roles.
MV-22B Osprey	Bell Boeing	USA	Tiltrotor	Cargo/Transport	Manned	2007	288		VTOL. 13 on order.
Black Hornet Nano	Teledyne FLIR	Norway	Helicopter	Reconnaissance	Unmanned	2015			
R80D SkyRaider	Teledyne FLIR	USA	Propeller	Reconnaissance	Unmanned				Quadcopter. Part replaces the RQ-7B Shadow.
X2D	Skydio	USA	Propeller	Reconnaissance	Unmanned				Quadcopter. Part replaces the RQ-7B Shadow.

== Navy ==
Aircraft are listed in the table below alphabetically by the 1962 United States Tri-Service aircraft designation system "Basic Mission" or "Vehicle Type" code (ignoring preceding "Modified Mission" or "Status Prefix" codes), then serially by "Design number", then alphabetically by "Series letter" and lastly alphabetically by "Modified Mission" or "Status Prefix" code when applicable. Aircraft without a 1962 Tri-Service designation system designation are listed alphabetically at the end of the table.

Type	Manufacturer	Origin	Propulsion	Role	Control	Introduced	In service	Total	Notes
F/A-18E/F Super Hornet	McDonnell Douglas / Northrop Grumman / Boeing	USA	Jet	Carrier-based Strike Fighter	Manned	1999	549		76 on order The Navy plans to divest 5 F/A-18F variants in FY2025.
EA-18G Growler	Boeing	USA	Jet	Carrier-based Electronic-warfare	Manned	2008	153		
C-2A Greyhound	Grumman	USA	Propeller	Carrier Onboard Delivery (COD)	Manned	1966	26		To be replaced by 44 CMV-22
UC-12F/M Huron	Beechcraft	USA	Propeller	Cargo/Transport	Manned	1986	13		
RC-12M Huron	Beechcraft	USA	Propeller	NRL support	Manned	1987	1		
NC-20G Grey Ghost	Gulfstream	USA	Jet	Test Range support	Manned	1994	1		
C-26A Metroliner	Fairchild	USA	Propeller	USNTPS trainer	Manned	1998	1		
C-26D Metroliner	Fairchild	USA	Propeller	Cargo/Transport	Manned	1998	4		
EC-26D Metroliner	Fairchild	USA	Propeller	Missile Range support	Manned	1998	1		
RC-26D Metroliner	Fairchild	USA	Propeller	Missile Range support	Manned	1998	2		
C-37A Gulfstream V	Gulfstream	USA	Jet	VIP Transport	Manned	2002	1		
C-37B Gulfstream G550	Gulfstream	USA	Jet	VIP Transport	Manned	2005	3		
NC-37B Gulfstream G550	Gulfstream	USA	Jet	Test Range support	Manned	2018	1		
C-38A Courier	Israel Aerospace Industries	Israel	Jet	Test & Evaluation support	Manned	1997	2		
C-40A Clipper	Boeing	USA	Jet	Cargo/Transport	Manned	2001	17		Projected inventory 19
C-130J Hercules	Lockheed Martin	USA	Propeller	Cargo/Transport	Manned	2020	1		One test and evaluation aircraft. KC-130J to replace KC-130T and C-130T beginning 2027, projected inventory 32
C-130T Hercules	Lockheed Martin	USA	Propeller	Cargo/Transport	Manned	1991	16		
KC-130T Hercules	Lockheed Martin	USA	Propeller	Cargo/Transport & Aerial Refueling, Test Range support	Manned	1983	16		
E-2C/D Hawkeye	Northrop Grumman	USA	Propeller	Carrier-based Airborne Command and Control	Manned	1964	83		15 on order. Projected E-2D inventory is 75
E-6B Mercury	Boeing	USA	Jet	TACAMO	Manned	1998	16		To be replaced with E-130J beginning 2028
F-5F/N Tiger II	Northrop	USA	Jet	Aggressor	Manned	1974	31		Used for adversary training
F-16A/B/C/D Fighting Falcon	General Dynamics	USA	Jet	Aggressor	Manned	2002	22 (Note: USN is acquiring up to 30 F-16C/D from the USAF to augment its 14 F-16A/B aircraft<https://nationalinterest.org/blog/buzz/us-navy-just-received-fleet-f-16-fighters-us-air-force-212658/>)		Used for adversary training
F-35C Lightning II	Lockheed Martin	USA	Jet	Carrier-based Strike Fighter	Manned	2019	45		260 planned
MH-53E Sea Dragon	Sikorsky	USA	Helicopter	Airborne mine countermeasures and vertical on-board delivery	Manned	1981	26		Operational employment is planned to end in FY2024, with final squadron retirement by the end of FY 2025.
TH-57B/C Sea Ranger	Bell	USA	Helicopter	Test & Evaluation support	Manned	1968	113		Replaced by the TH-73A Thrasher. The last TH-57 was withdrawn from Training Command use in 2025 with only a few aircraft retained for Test and Evaluation Squadron use.
UH-60A/L Blackhawk	Sikorsky	USA	Helicopter	USNTPS trainer	Manned	1984	4		
MH-60R Seahawk	Sikorsky	USA	Helicopter	Anti-submarine warfare, Anti-surface warfare, Electronic warfare	Manned	2006	270		
MH-60S Seahawk	Sikorsky	USA	Helicopter	Vertical replenishment, Combat Search and Rescue, Naval Special Warfare support	Manned	2002	256		
TH-67 Creek	Bell	USA	Helicopter	USNTPS trainer	Manned	1993	4		
UH-72A Lakota	Airbus	Germany	Helicopter	USNTPS trainer	Manned	2009	5		
TH-73A Thrasher	Leonardo	Italy	Helicopter	Trainer	Manned	2021	59		71 on order
P-3C Orion	Boeing	USA	Propeller	Test Range support	Manned	1960s	4		
NP-3C/D Orion	Boeing	USA	Propeller	NRL support, Test Range support	Manned	1980s	4		
P-8A Poseidon	Boeing	USA	Jet	Maritime patrol	Manned	2013	118		10 on order
MQ-4C Triton	Northrop Grumman	USA	Jet	Intelligence Surveillance and Reconnaissance	Unmanned	2018	20		27 Planned
MQ-8C Fire Scout	Northrop Grumman	USA	Helicopter	Surveillance and Reconnaissance	Unmanned	2009	10		As of May 2024, the Navy will end operational employment of the MQ-8C at the end of FY2024. Sundown will follow at the end of FY2026.
RQ-21A Blackjack	Boeing Insitu	USA	Propeller	Surveillance and Reconnaissance	Unmanned	2014			
MQ-25A Stingray	Boeing	USA	Jet	Aerial Refueling	Unmanned	2025	1		Projected inventory 76
MQ-27B ScanEagle	Boeing	USA	Propeller	Surveillance and Reconnaissance	Unmanned	2005			
T-6A/B Texan II	Beechcraft	USA	Propeller	Trainer	Manned	2003	294		29 on order. The T-6A is used as the primary flight trainer for student NFOs and the T-6B for student Naval Aviators
T-34C Mentor	Beechcraft	USA	Propeller	Fleet Training and Test support	Manned	1977	15		The T-34 was replaced by the T-6 as the Navy/Marine Corps/Coast Guard primary trainer. A few are retained in miscellaneous support roles.
T-38 Talon	Northrop	USA	Jet	USNTPS trainer	Manned	1969	10		
T-44C Pegasus	Beechcraft	USA	Propeller	Trainer	Manned	1977	56		T-44s are being replaced by the T-54A. The Navy plans to divest 10 T-44s in FY2025.
T-45C Goshawk	McDonnell Douglas	UK/USA	Jet	Carrier-capable Trainer	Manned	1997	189		
T-54A Marlin II	Beechcraft	USA	Propeller	Trainer	Manned	2024	2		Used to train aviators flying the C-130, C-144, C-27, E-6, E-2, P-8, V-22. First delivered in 2024. Up to 64 planned.
NU-1B Otter	de Havilland Canada	Canada	Propeller	USNTPS trainer	Manned	1966	1		
U-6A Beaver	de Havilland Canada	Canada	Propeller	USNTPS glider tow	Manned		2		
UV-18A Twin Otter	de Havilland Canada	Canada	Propeller	NRL support	Manned	2019	1		
CMV-22B Osprey	Bell Boeing	USA	Tiltrotor	Carrier Onboard Delivery (COD)	Manned	2021	19		Projected inventory 44
X-26A Frigate Glider	Schweizer	USA	Glider	USNTPS trainer	Manned	1962	2		

== Space Force ==
Type	Manufacturer	Origin	Propulsion	Role	Control	Introduced	In service	Notes
X-37B	Boeing	USA	Rocket	Spaceplane	Unmanned	2010 (first space flight)	2	Seven launches since program began.

== See also ==
- United States Army Aviation Branch#Equipment
- United States Marine Corps Aviation#Current inventory
- Lists of military aircraft of the United States
  - List of currently active United States naval aircraft
  - List of active United States Air Force aircraft
  - List of military aircraft of the United States
  - Future military aircraft of the United States
- List of U.S. DoD aircraft designations
- UAVs in the U.S. military
- Fox (code word)

== Bibliography ==
- Church, Aaron M. U. (2023). USAF & USSF Almanac 2023 Weapons & Platforms (PDF). Air & Space Forces Magazine (Report). Air & Space Forces Association.
- Church, Aaron M. U. (2024). USAF & USSF Almanac 2024 Weapons & Platforms (PDF). Air & Space Forces Magazine (Report). Air & Space Forces Association.
- 2024 World Air Forces (Report). Flight Global. 2023.
- "Department of Defense Report on Force Structure Changes for the Fiscal Year (FY) 2025 Defense Budget" (PDF). Office of the Under Secretary of Defense (Comptroller)/Chief Financial Officer. April 2024.
