= List of future military aircraft of the United States =

This is a list of military aircraft that are being developed for use by the United States military in the near future.

For aircraft in-service see List of active United States military aircraft.

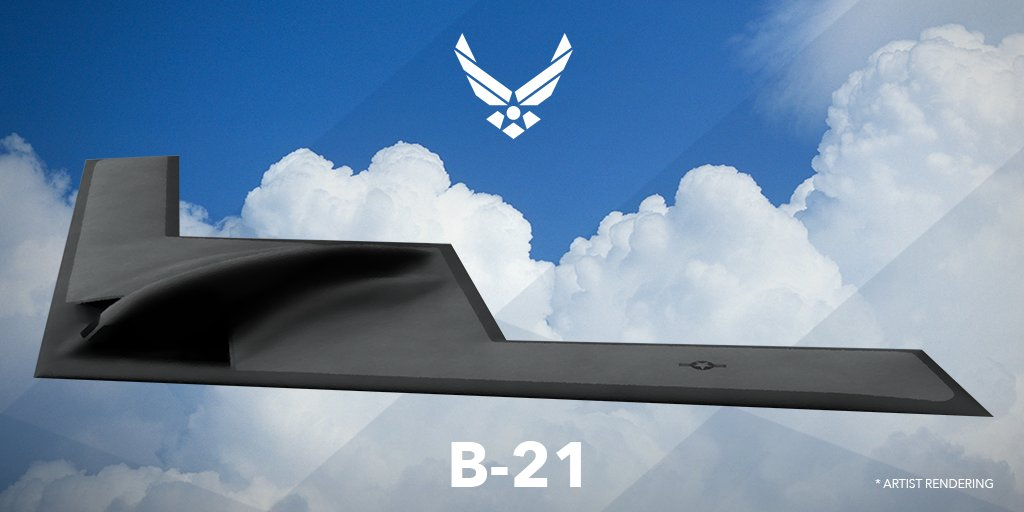
Northrop Grumman B-21

Aircraft	Type	Operators	Notes
Fixed-wing Aircraft
Boeing T-7 Red Hawk	Trainer	Air Force	To enter service around 2028.
Northrop Grumman B-21 Raider	Stealth Strategic bomber	Air Force	To enter service in 2026 or 2027.
Boeing MQ-25 Stingray	Unmanned combat aerial vehicle for Aerial refueling	Navy	To enter service in 2026
Boeing E-7 Wedgetail	Airborne early warning and control	Air Force	To enter service around 2027.
Lockheed Martin E-130J	Airborne command post	Navy	To enter service after 2027.
Boeing VC-25B	Presidential Transport	Air Force	To enter service between 2027-2028
Boeing F/A-XX	Multirole combat aircraft	Navy	To enter service around 2030.
Next Generation Air Dominance / Boeing F-47	Air superiority fighter	Air Force	To enter service around 2030.
SNC E-4C Survivable Airborne Operations Center	Airborne command post	Air Force	To enter service around 2032.
KC-Z Next Generation Air-Refueling System	Tanker/Transport	Air Force	To enter service around 2040
ME-11B High Accuracy Detection and Exploitation System	ISR/SIGINT	Army	To enter service around 2027.
General Atomics FQ-42 Vengeance	Collaborative Combat Aircraft	Air Force	To enter service before 2030.
Anduril FQ-44 Fury	Collaborative Combat Aircraft	Air Force	To enter service before 2030.
Kratos MQ-58B Valkyrie	Collaborative Combat Aircraft	Marine Corps	To enter service by 2029
Helicopters
Future Vertical Lift Helicopters	Multirole Helicopters	Army	Version to enter service between 2025-2035.
Bell V-280 Valor	Tiltrotor Military helicopter	Army	To enter service around 2030

== See also ==
- List of U.S. DoD aircraft designations
- List of military aircraft of the United States
- Bell Boeing Quad TiltRotor
