= List of active United States naval aircraft =

This is a list of United States Navy aircraft. It does not include naval aircraft operated by the other two naval services of the United States; the United States Marine Corps (USMC) and United States Coast Guard (USCG). For the aircraft of those services, see United States Marine Corps Aviation#Current inventory and List of equipment of the United States Coast Guard#Aircraft. For a complete list of naval aircraft designated under pre-1962 United States Navy designation systems, see List of United States Navy aircraft designations (pre-1962); for aircraft without formal designations, see List of undesignated military aircraft of the United States. For a list of all naval aircraft designated under the post-1962 unified Department of Defense designations, see List of military aircraft of the United States.

U.S. Military aircraft are designated using the "1962 United States Tri-Service aircraft designation system." The system designates aircraft by Basic Mission in the case of fixed wing, manned, powered, conventional take off and landing aircraft and by Vehicle Type and Basic Mission in the case of all other aircraft (Helicopters, UAVs, Gliders, VSTOL). A Modified Mission code may be added in front of the Basic Mission code to further define the mission of multi-role aircraft or to define the mission of an aircraft after it has been modified or adapted for a different mission than its original designation indicates. In some cases a Modified Mission code is used in lieu of the Basic Mission code where no basic mission code exists which adequately defines the mission of the aircraft. A Status Prefix may be added at the front of the designation of aircraft developed or converted to function as research, testing or development aircraft. "MDS" ("Mission", "Design", "Series") is shorthand to describe this system. The legacy term "TMS" ("Type", "Model", "Series") is sometimes still used by the U.S. Navy instead of MDS.

There are two tables below, the first lists current Navy aircraft by MDS and the second lists them categorized by the function for which they are used by the U.S. Navy.

== Aircraft list by MDS ==
Aircraft are presented in this table ordered by their 1962 United States Tri-Service aircraft designation system first alphabetically by Basic Mission letter code, then by Design number, then by Series letter (MDS), then lastly if applicable by Modified Mission or Status Prefix code. the Basic Mission code appears immediately to the left of the " - ", the " - " is followed by the Design number and the Series letter follows. Designations for aircraft other than fixed wing, manned, conventional take off and landing, powered aircraft (Helicopters, UAVs, V/STOL) include a Vehicle Type code between the Basic Mission code and the " - ". That code is used in this table only to define subsections of the table but it is ignored in the ordering of the aircraft within that subsection. Aircraft are not always used as would be assumed by their MDS and the fourth column of this table lists the actual role in which that aircraft is employed by the Navy.

| Aircraft | Origin | Modified Mission or Status Prefix | Role | In service | Notes |
Basic Mission: "A" Attack
| F/A-18E,F Super Hornet | USA | Two Basic Missions: F-Fighter & A-Attack (Note: F/A is a non-systematic designation (not in accordance with the 1962 Tri-Service aircraft designation system). Originally, the Navy planned to have two variants of the Hornet: the F-18 fighter and A-18 light attack aircraft. During development, "F/A-18" was used as a shorthand to refer to both variants. When the Navy decided to develop a single aircraft able to perform both missions, the "F/A" shorthand for the two Basic Mission Codes of "F" and "A" stuck despite the designation system not allowing for the use of two Basic Mission Codes or for slashes.) | Carrier-based Strike Fighter (Note: F/A-18E,F also used as an Aggressor and is flown by the Blue Angels) | 585 | 37 on order |
| EA-18G Growler | USA | Modified Mission: E-Electronic Warfare | Carrier-based ECM / SEAD | 153 | |
Basic Mission: "C" Cargo
| UC-12F,M Huron | USA | Modified Mission: U-Utility | Transport | 13 (Note: Naval Air Systems Command Fact Sheet<https://www.navair.navy.mil/product/c-12/>) | |
| RC-12M Huron | USA | Modified Mission: R-Reconnaissance | NRL support | 1 | |
| NC-20G Grey Ghost | USA | Status Prefix: N-Special test, permanent | Test Range support | 1 (Note: Naval Air Systems Command Fact Sheet<https://www.navair.navy.mil/product/C-20-Gulfstream/>) | |
| C-26A Metroliner | USA | | USNTPS trainer | 1 (Note: Naval Air Systems Command Fact Sheet<https://www.navair.navy.mil/product/C-26-Metroliner/>) | |
| C-26D Metroliner | USA | | Transport | 4 | |
| EC-26D Metroliner | USA | Modified Mission: E-Electronic Warfare | Missile Range support | 1 | |
| RC-26D Metroliner | USA | Modified Mission: R-Reconnaissance | Missile Range support | 2 | |
| C-37A Gulfstream V | USA | | Executive transport | 1 (Note: Naval Air Systems Command Fact Sheet<https://www.navair.navy.mil/product/C-37/>) | |
| C-37B Gulfstream G550 | USA | | Executive transport | 3 | |
| NC-37B Gulfstream G550 | USA | Status Prefix: N-Special test, permanent | Test Range support | 1 | |
| C-38A Courier | USA | | Test & Evaluation support | 2 (Note: Naval Air Systems Command Fact Sheet<https://www.navair.navy.mil/product/C-38/>) | |
| C-40A Clipper | USA | | NUFEA (Note: Navy Unique Fleet Essential Airlift) | 17 (Note: Naval Air Systems Command Fact Sheet<https://www.navair.navy.mil/product/C-40-Clipper/>) | |
| C-130T Hercules | USA | | NUFEA | 16 (Note: Naval Air Systems Command Fact Sheet<https://www.navair.navy.mil/product/CKC-130-Hercules-Super-Hercules/>) | To be replaced by KC-130J beginning 2027 |
| KC-130T Hercules | USA | Modified Mission: K-Aerial Refueling | NUFEA (5 are Test & Evaluation support) | 16 | To be replaced by KC-130J beginning 2027 |
| C-130J Super Hercules | USA | | Blue Angels "Fat Albert" | 1 | Acquired from the U.K. |
| KC-130J Super Hercules | USA | Modified Mission: K-Aerial Refueling | NUFEA | 0 (Note: 1 aircraft was authorized in 2024 and 2 in 2025, none have been delivered yet as of the end of 2025) | Projected invntry 32 (Note: To replace USNR C-130T and KC-130T by 2032) |
Basic Mission: "E" Special Electronic Installation
| E-2D Hawkeye | USA | | Carrier-based AEW / Airborne C2 | 65 | Projected inventory 86 |
| E-6B Mercury | USA | | TACAMO / ALCS | 16 | Replaced by E-130J beginning 2034 (Note: Naval Air Systems Command Fact Sheet<https://www.navair.navy.mil/product/E-6B-Mercury/>) |
| E-130J Phoenix II | USA | | TACAMO (Note: The E-130J will replace the E-6B in the communications link to Ballistic Missile Submarines mission but it will not be equipped with ALCS to launch USAF land based Intercontinental Ballistic Missiles. That role will be re-assumed by the USAF presumably with an E-4 variant) | 1 | 3 on order Projected inventory 31, IOC 2034 |
Basic Mission: "F" Fighter
| F-5F,N Tiger II | USA | | Aggressor | 33 | Up to 38 by 2028 (Note: 22 F-5s being received from Switzerland beginning in 2024. 11 will go to the USN and 11 to the USMC to add to 27 F-5F,N already in USN service<https://www.navair.navy.mil/product/F-5-Tiger-II/>) |
| F-16A,B Fighting Falcon | USA | | Aggressor | 14 (Note: Naval Air Systems Command Fact Sheet<https://www.navair.navy.mil/product/F-16-Fighting-Falcon-Viper/>) | Embargoed acft (Note: Aircraft originally intended for Pakistan but embargoed in 2002) |
| F-16C,D Fighting Falcon | USA | | Aggressor | 26 (Note: USN acquired 26 F-16C/D in 2022 from the USAF to augment its 14 F-16A/B aircraft<https://nationalinterest.org/blog/buzz/us-navy-just-received-fleet-f-16-fighters-us-air-force-212658/>) | USAF divested in 2022 |
| F-35C Lightning II | USA | | Carrier-based Strike Fighter | 72 | Projected inventory 273 |
Basic Mission: "P" Maritime Patrol
| P-3C Orion | USA | | Test Range support | 4 | Replaced by P-8 (Note: retained for Test Range support) |
| NP-3C Orion | USA | Status Prefix: N-Special test, permanent | NRL support | 2 | |
| NP-3D Orion | USA | Status Prefix: N-Special test, permanent | Test Range support | 1 | |
| P-8A Poseidon | USA | | Maritime Patrol | 126 | 3 on order |
Basic Mission: "T" Trainer
| T-6A Texan II | USA | | Student NFO (SNFO) primary trainer | 40 | |
| T-6B Texan II | USA | | Student Naval Aviator (SNA) primary trainer | 254 | |
| T-34C Turbo-Mentor | USA | | Fleet training support (Chase / Spotting) | 15 | Former trainer (Note: The T-34C was the primary trainer for USN/USMC/USCG Naval Aviators and USN/USMC Naval Flight Officers (NFO) until replaced by the T-6A and T-6B in the late 2000s/early 2010s. Some were retained to support the ongoing training of fleet Strike Fighter squadron aviators) |
| T-38C Talon | USA | | USNTPS trainer | 10 | |
| T-44C Pegasus | USA | | SNA advanced trainer | 20 | Being replaced by T-54A beginning 2024 |
| T-45C Goshawk | UK; USA | | SNA/SNFO advanced trainer | 189 | Approx 20 for SNFO, remainder for SNA |
| T-54A Marlin II | USA | | SNA advanced trainer | 45 | Projected inventory 65 to replace T-44C by 2027 |
Basic Mission: "U" Utility
| NU-1B Otter | Canada | Status Prefix: N-Special test, permanent | USNTPS trainer | 1 | |
| U-6A Beaver | Canada | | USNTPS trainer / glider tow | 2 | |
Basic Mission: "X" Special Research
| X-26A Frigate Glider (Note: this is a Non-systematic designation as the Vehicle Type 'G' for glider is omitted. If the aircraft was first developed as a special research glider a systematic designation would have been XG (Vehicle Type "G" Glider with Basic Mission "X" Special Research). Once the USN adapted it as a USNTPS trainer a Modified Mission Code of "T" Trainer could have been added for a designation of TXG-26.) | USA | | USNTPS trainer | 2 (Note: Naval Air Systems Command Fact Sheet<https://www.navair.navy.mil/product/x-26a-frigate-glider>) | |

| Aircraft | Origin | Basic Mission and Modified Mission | Role | In service | Notes |
Vehicle Type: "H" Helicopter
| MH-53E Sea Dragon | USA | Modified Mission: M-Multi-mission (Note: "M" is a Modified Mission code which was used in this case in lieu of a Basic Mission code) | AMCM (Note: Airborne Mine Countermeasures) / VOD (Note: Vertical Onboard Delivery (VOD) is a term used by the US Navy to describe heavy lift helicopters in a COD role) | 18 | To be retired by FY 2027 |
| MH-60R Seahawk | USA | Modified Mission: M-Multi-mission | ASW / ASUW / EW / ISR / NSFS (Note: Naval Surface Fire Support) | 270 (Note: Naval Air Systems Command Fact Sheet<https://www.navair.navy.mil/product/MH-60R-Seahawk/>) | |
| MH-60S Seahawk | USA | Modified Mission: M-Multi-mission | SAR / CSAR / ASUW / NSW (Note: airlift for Naval Special Warfare forces) / AMCM / VERTREP / MEDEVAC / HADR (Note: Humanitarian Assistance/Disaster Relief) | 256 (Note: Naval Air Systems Command Fact Sheet<https://www.navair.navy.mil/product/MH-60S-Seahawk/>) | |
| OH-58 Kiowa | USA | Basic Mission: O-Observation | USNTPS trainer | 3 | |
| TH-57C Sea Ranger | USA | Basic Mission: T-Trainer | Test & Evaluation support | 2 | Former trainer (Note: The TH-57 was the rotary wing trainer for USN/USMC/USCG Naval Aviators until replaced by the TH-73 in 2025. Some retained for Test and Evaluation squadron use) (Note: Naval Air Systems Command Fact Sheet<https://www.navair.navy.mil/product/TH-57/>) |
| TH-73A Thrasher | Italy | Basic Mission: T-Trainer | SNA advanced trainer | 130 | Replaced TH-57 (Note: Naval Air Systems Command Fact Sheet<https://www.navair.navy.mil/product/TH-73A/>) |
| UH-60A,L Blackhawk | USA | Basic Mission: U-Utility | USNTPS trainer | 4 | |
| UH-72A Lakota | Germany | Basic Mission: U-Utility | USNTPS trainer | 4 (Note: Naval Air Systems Command Fact Sheet<https://www.navair.navy.mil/product/UH-72-Lakota-TH-67-Creek/>) | |
Vehicle Type: "Q" Unmanned Aerial Vehicle (Note: Only Group 4 and 5 aircraft are listed here. Group 4 and 5 air vehicles are large vehicles with at least 1320lb maximum gross take off weight which are piloted by a winged Naval Aviator, Naval Flight Officer (NFO) or Air Vehicle Pilot qualified to fly the specific aircraft by completion of training at that aircraft's Fleet Replacement Squadron. An Air Vehicle Pilot is a Warrant Officer who has completed the Naval Air Training Command training program resulting in award of Air Vehicle Pilot wings.)
| MQ-4C Triton | USA | Modified Mission: M-Multi-mission | ISR | 9 | Projected inventory 27 |
| MQ-25A Stingray | USA | Modified Mission: M-Multi-mission | Carrier-based Tanker / ISR | 0 | Projected inventory 76, first delivery in 2029 |
Vehicle Type: "V" Vertical and/or Short Take Off and Landing
| CMV-22B Osprey | USA | Modified Mission: M-Multi-mission (Note: "CMV" is a non-systematic (not in strict accordance with the 1962 Tri-service system) designation. A systematic designation would have been MCV-22 (Vehicle Type code "V" V/STOL, Basic Mission Code "C" Cargo or Transport, and Modified Mission Code "M" Multi-Mission), however; when the USN designated the aircraft it did so by adding a modified mission code of "C" (Cargo or Transport) to the USMC's MV-22 resulting in CMV-22); Modified Mission: C-Cargo | Carrier capable logistics "Carrier Onboard Delivery" (COD) | 38 | Projected inventory 48 (Note: Naval Air Systems Command Fact Sheet<https://www.navair.navy.mil/product/CMV-22B-Osprey#>) |
| UV-18 Twin Otter | Canada | Basic Mission: U-Utility | NRL support | 1 | |

== Aircraft list by function ==
Aircraft are presented in this table grouped by their basic function. The third column defines their Basic or Modified mission or Status Prefix codes and the fourth column lists the actual role or roles in which the aircraft is used by the Navy.

| Aircraft | Origin | Vehicle Type, Basic Mission, Modified Mission, Status Prefix | Role | In service | Notes |
Sea Based or Carrier Air Wing aircraft (Note: These aircraft deploy aboard Aircraft Carriers as part of a Carrier Air Wing. MH-60R and MH-60S aircraft deploy both aboard Aircraft Carriers in Carrier Air Wing Squadrons and in detachments aboard other USN ships; also, some EA-18G squadrons are augmented with a few USAF pilots and/or Combat Systems Officers and do not deploy aboard Aircraft Carriers but to fixed land bases. A number of each aircraft type are also used in various training or other support roles)
| F-35C Lightning II | USA | Basic Mission: F-Fighter | Carrier-based Strike Fighter (Note: F/A-18E,F also used as an Aggressor and is flown by the Blue Angels) | 72 | Projected inventory 273 |
| F/A-18E,F Super Hornet | USA | Basic Missions: F-Fighter & A-Attack | Carrier-based Strike Fighter | 585 | 37 on order |
| EA-18G Growler | USA | Basic Mission: A-Attack; Modified Mission: E-Electronic Warfare | Carrier-based ECM / SEAD | 153 | |
| E-2D Hawkeye | USA | Basic Mission: E-Special Electronic Installation | Carrier-based AEW / Airborne C2 | 65 | Projected inventory 86 |
| MH-60R Seahawk | USA | Vehicle Type: H-Helicopter; Modified Mission: M-Multi-mission | ASW / ASUW / EW / ISR / NSFS (Note: Naval Surface Fire Support) | 270 (Note: Naval Air Systems Command Fact Sheet<https://www.navair.navy.mil/product/MH-60R-Seahawk/>) | |
| MH-60S Seahawk | USA | Vehicle Type: H-Helicopter; Modified Mission: M-Multi-mission | SAR / CSAR / ASUW / NSW (Note: airlift for Naval Special Warfare forces) / AMCM / VERTREP / MEDEVAC / HADR (Note: Humanitarian Assistance/Disaster Relief) | 256 (Note: Naval Air Systems Command Fact Sheet<https://www.navair.navy.mil/product/MH-60S-Seahawk/>) | |
| CMV-22B Osprey | USA | Vehicle Type: V-VSTOL; Modified Mission: M-Multi-mission (Note: "CMV" is a non-systematic (not in strict accordance with the 1962 Tri-service system) designation. A systematic designation would have been MCV-22 (Vehicle Type code "V" V/STOL, Basic Mission Code "C" Cargo or Transport, and Modified Mission Code "M" Multi-Mission), however; when the USN designated the aircraft it did so by adding a modified mission code of "C" (Cargo or Transport) to the USMC's MV-22 resulting in CMV-22); Modified Mission: C-Cargo | Carrier capable logistics "Carrier Onboard Delivery" (COD) | 38 | Projected inventory 48 (Note: Naval Air Systems Command Fact Sheet<https://www.navair.navy.mil/product/CMV-22B-Osprey#>) |
| MQ-25A Stingray | USA | Vehicle Type: Q-Unmanned aerial vehicle Modified Mission: M-Multi-mission | Carrier-based Tanker / ISR | 0 | Projected inventory 76, first delivery in 2029 |
Land Based operational aircraft (Note: These aircraft are land based combat or combat support aircraft (though the MH-53E is capable of shipboard operations it is not routinely deployed aboard ships and never as part of a Carrier Air Wing).)
| P-8A Poseidon | USA | Basic Mission: P-Maritime Patrol | Maritime Patrol | 126 | 3 on order |
| E-6B Mercury | USA | Basic Mission: E-Special Electronic Installation | TACAMO / ALCS | 16 | Replaced by E-130J beginning 2034 |
| E-130J Phoenix II | USA | Basic Mission: E-Special Electronic Installation | TACAMO (Note: The E-130J will replace the E-6B in the communications link to Ballistic Missile Submarines mission but it will not be equipped with ALCS to launch USAF land based Intercontinental Ballistic Missiles. That role will be re-assumed by the USAF presumably with an E-4 variant) | 1 | 3 on order Projected inventory 31, IOC 2034 |
| MQ-4C Triton | USA | Vehicle Type: Q-Unmanned aerial vehicle Modified Mission: M-Multi-mission | ISR | 9 | Projected inventory 27 |
| MH-53E Sea Dragon | USA | Vehicle Type: H-Helicopter; Modified Mission: M-Multi-mission | AMCM / VOD (Note: Vertical Onboard Delivery (VOD) is a term used by the US Navy to describe heavy lift helicopters in a COD role) | 18 | To be retired by FY 2027 |
Cargo and transport aircraft (Note: Except for the C-130J operated by the Blue Angels (Fat Albert) and the few KC-130Ts used to support test & evaluation operations, these aircraft are operated exclusively by U.S. Navy Reserve Fleet Logistics Support (VR) squadrons or by Air Operations Departments of Naval Air Stations to move personnel and cargo in support of the operating forces of the Navy.)
| UC-12F,M Huron | USA | Basic Mission: C-Cargo; Modified Mission: U-Utility | Transport | 13 | |
| C-26D Metroliner | USA | Basic Mission: C-Cargo | Transport | 4 | |
| C-37A Gulfstream V | USA | Basic Mission: C-Cargo | Executive transport | 1 | |
| C-37B Gulfstream G550 | USA | Basic Mission: C-Cargo | Executive transport | 3 | |
| C-130J Super Hercules | USA | Basic Mission: C-Cargo | Blue Angels "Fat Albert" | 1 | Acquired from the U.K. |
| C-40A Clipper | USA | Basic Mission: C-Cargo | NUFEA | 17 (Note: Naval Air Systems Command Fact Sheet<https://www.navair.navy.mil/product/C-40-Clipper/>) | |
| C-130T Hercules | USA | Basic Mission: C-Cargo | NUFEA | 16 | To be replaced by KC-130J beginning 2027 |
| KC-130J Super Hercules | USA | Basic Mission: C-Cargo; Modified Mission: K-Aerial Refueling | NUFEA | 0 (Note: 1 aircraft was authorized in 2024 and 2 in 2025, none have been delivered yet as of the end of 2025) | Projected inventory 32 to replace C-130T & KC-130T by 2032 |
| KC-130T Hercules | USA | Basic Mission: C-Cargo; Modified Mission: K-Aerial Refueling | NUFEA (5 Test & Evaluation support) | 16 | To be replaced by KC-130J beginning 2027 |
Fleet Training support aircraft (Note: These aircraft are used to provided simulated enemy aircraft for training (a limited number of F/A-18E,F aircraft are also used in this role) or in the case of T-34 in various roles to support Strike Fighter pilot training.)
| F-5F,N Tiger II | USA | Basic Mission: F-Fighter | Aggressor | 33 | Up to 38 by 2028 (Note: 22 F-5s being received from Switzerland beginning in 2024. 11 will go to the USN and 11 to the USMC to add to 27 F-5F,N already in USN service<https://www.navair.navy.mil/product/F-5-Tiger-II/>) |
| F-16A,B Fighting Falcon | USA | Basic Mission: F-Fighter | Aggressor | 14 (Note: Naval Air Systems Command Fact Sheet<https://www.navair.navy.mil/product/F-16-Fighting-Falcon-Viper/>) | Embargoed Pakistani acft (Note: Aircraft originally intended for Pakistan but embargoed in 2002) |
| F-16C,D Fighting Falcon | USA | Basic Mission: F-Fighter | Aggressor | 26 (Note: USN acquired 26 F-16C/D in 2022 from the USAF to augment its 14 F-16A/B aircraft<https://nationalinterest.org/blog/buzz/us-navy-just-received-fleet-f-16-fighters-us-air-force-212658/>) | Retired by the USAF 2022 |
| T-34C Turbo-Mentor | USA | Basic Mission: T-Trainer | Fleet training support (Chase / Spotting) | 15 | Former trainer (Note: The T-34C was the primary trainer for USN/USMC/USCG Naval Aviators and USN/USMC Naval Flight Officers (NFO) until replaced by the T-6A and T-6B in the late 2000s/early 2010s. Some were retained to support the ongoing training of fleet Strike Fighter squadron aviators) |
Naval Air Training Command aircraft (Note: These aircraft are used in the initial training and qualification of USN, USMC and USCG Naval Aviators and USN Naval Flight Officers (NFO))
| T-6A Texan II | USA | Basic Mission: T-Trainer | Student NFO (SNFO) primary trainer | 294 | Approx 40 T-6A SNFO trainers, remainder are T-6B SNA trainers |
| T-6B Texan II | USA | Basic Mission: T-Trainer | Student Naval Aviator (SNA) primary trainer | 294 | Approx 40 T-6A SNFO trainers, remainder are T-6B SNA trainers |
| T-45C Goshawk | UK; USA | Basic Mission: T-Trainer | SNA/SNFO advanced trainer | 189 | Approx 20 SNFO trainers, remainder are SNA trainers |
| T-44C Pegasus | USA | Basic Mission: T-Trainer | SNA advanced trainer | 76 (Note: combined T-44C and T-54A inventory) | 43 T-54A on order, 64 projected to replace T-44C 2024 - 2027 |
| T-54A Marlin II | USA | Basic Mission: T-Trainer | SNA advanced trainer | 76 | 43 T-54A on order, 64 projected to replace T-44C 2024 - 2027 |
| TH-73A Thrasher | Italy | Vehicle Type: H-Helicoter; Basic Mission: T-Trainer | SNA advanced trainer | 130 | Replaced the TH-57B,C (Note: Naval Air Systems Command Fact Sheet<https://www.navair.navy.mil/product/TH-73A/>) |
Research and Test & Evaluation aircraft (Note: These aircraft are used by Air Test and Evaluation (VX) squadrons in the support of Developmental Test and Evaluation (DT&E) or Operational Test and Evaluation (OT&E) of USN and USMC aircraft and airborne weapons and systems, or by the Naval Research Laboratory's Scientific Development (VXS) squadron in support of research and development projects.)
| UV-18 Twin Otter | Canada | Vehicle Type: V-VSTOL; Basic Mission: U-Utility | NRL support | 1 | |
| RC-12M Huron | USA | Basic Mission: C-Cargo; Modified Mission: R-Reconnaissance | NRL support | 1 | |
| NP-3C Orion | USA | Basic Mission: P-Maritime Patrol; Status Prefix: N-Special test, permanent | NRL support | 2 | |
| NP-3D Orion | USA | Basic Mission: P-Maritime Patrol; Status Prefix: N-Special test, permanent | Test Range support | 1 | |
| NC-20G Grey Ghost | USA | Basic Mission: C-Cargo; Status Prefix: N-Special test, permanent | Test Range support | 1 | |
| NC-37B Gulfstream G550 | USA | Basic Mission: C-Cargo; Status Prefix: N-Special test, permanent | Test Range support | 1 | |
| P-3C Orion | USA | Basic Mission: P-Maritime Patrol | Test Range support | 4 | Replaced by P-8, retained for Test Range support |
| EC-26D Metroliner | USA | Basic Mission: C-Cargo; Modified Mission: E-Electronic Warfare | Missile Range support | 1 | |
| RC-26D Metroliner | USA | Basic Mission: C-Cargo; Modified Mission: R-Reconnaissance | Missile Range support | 2 | |
| C-38A Courier | USA | Basic Mission: C-Cargo | Test & Evaluation support | 2 (Note: Naval Air Systems Command Fact Sheet<https://www.navair.navy.mil/product/C-38/>) | |
| TH-57C Sea Ranger | USA | Vehicle Type: H-Helicopter; Basic Mission: T-Trainer | Test & Evaluation support | 2 | Former trainer, (Note: The TH-57 was the rotary wing trainer for USN/USMC/USCG Naval Aviators until replaced by the TH-73 in 2025) retained for T&E squadron use (Note: Naval Air Systems Command Fact Sheet<https://www.navair.navy.mil/product/TH-57/>) |
U.S. Naval Test Pilot School (USNTPS) aircraft (Note: The aircraft listed below are in the custody of and are unique to the USNTPS; however, the school also uses other types of aircraft through lease or other temporary arrangement. It also uses the F/A-18 Super Hornet and T-6B Texan II.)
| U-6A Beaver | Canada | Basic Mission: U-Utility | USNTPS trainer / glider tow | 2 | |
| NU-1B Otter | Canada | Basic Mission: U-Utility; Status Prefix: N-Special test, permanent | USNTPS trainers | 1 | |
| C-26A Metroliner | USA | Basic Mission: C-Cargo | USNTPS trainers | 1 | |
| X-26A Frigate Glider | USA | Basic Mission: X-Special Research (Note: this is a Non-systematic designation as the Vehicle Type 'G' for glider is omitted. If the aircraft was first developed as a special research glider a systematic designation would have been XG (Vehicle Type "G" Glider with Basic Mission "X" Special Research). Once the USN adapted it as a USNTPS trainer a Modified Mission Code of "T" Trainer could have been added for a designation of TXG-26.) | USNTPS trainers | 2 (Note: Naval Air Systems Command Fact Sheet<https://www.navair.navy.mil/product/x-26a-frigate-glider>) | |
| T-38C Talon | USA | Basic Mission: T-Trainer | USNTPS trainers | 10 | |
| OH-58 Kiowa | USA | Vehicle Type: H-Helicopter; Basic Mission: O-Observation | USNTPS trainers | 3 | |
| UH-60A,L Blackhawk | USA | Vehicle Type: H-Helicopter; Basic Mission: U-Utility | USNTPS trainers | 4 | |
| UH-72A Lakota | Germany | Vehicle Type: H-Helicopter; Basic Mission: U-Utility | USNTPS trainers | 4 | |

== Photo gallery ==
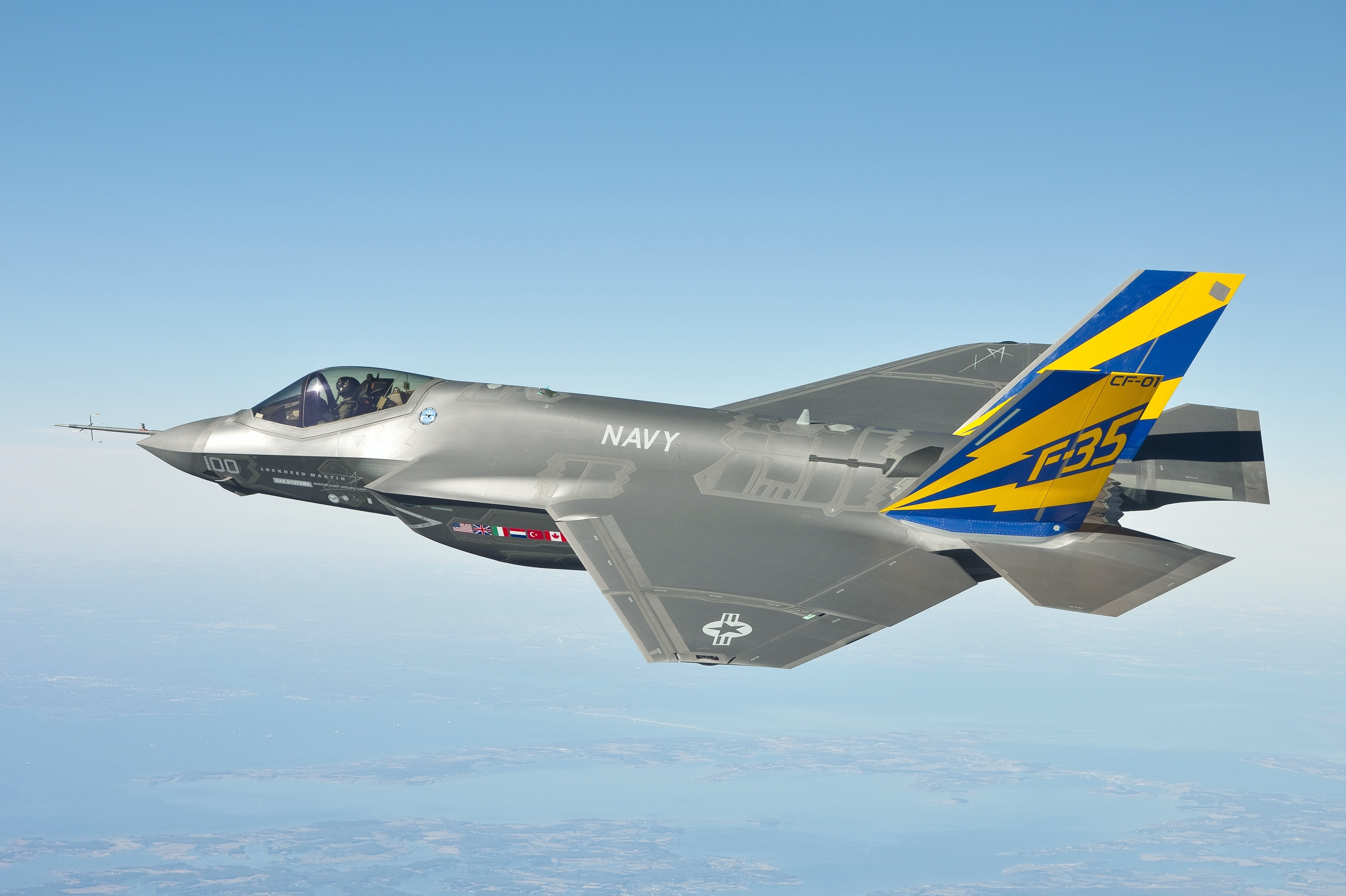
An F-35C conducts a test flight with VX-23, February 2011

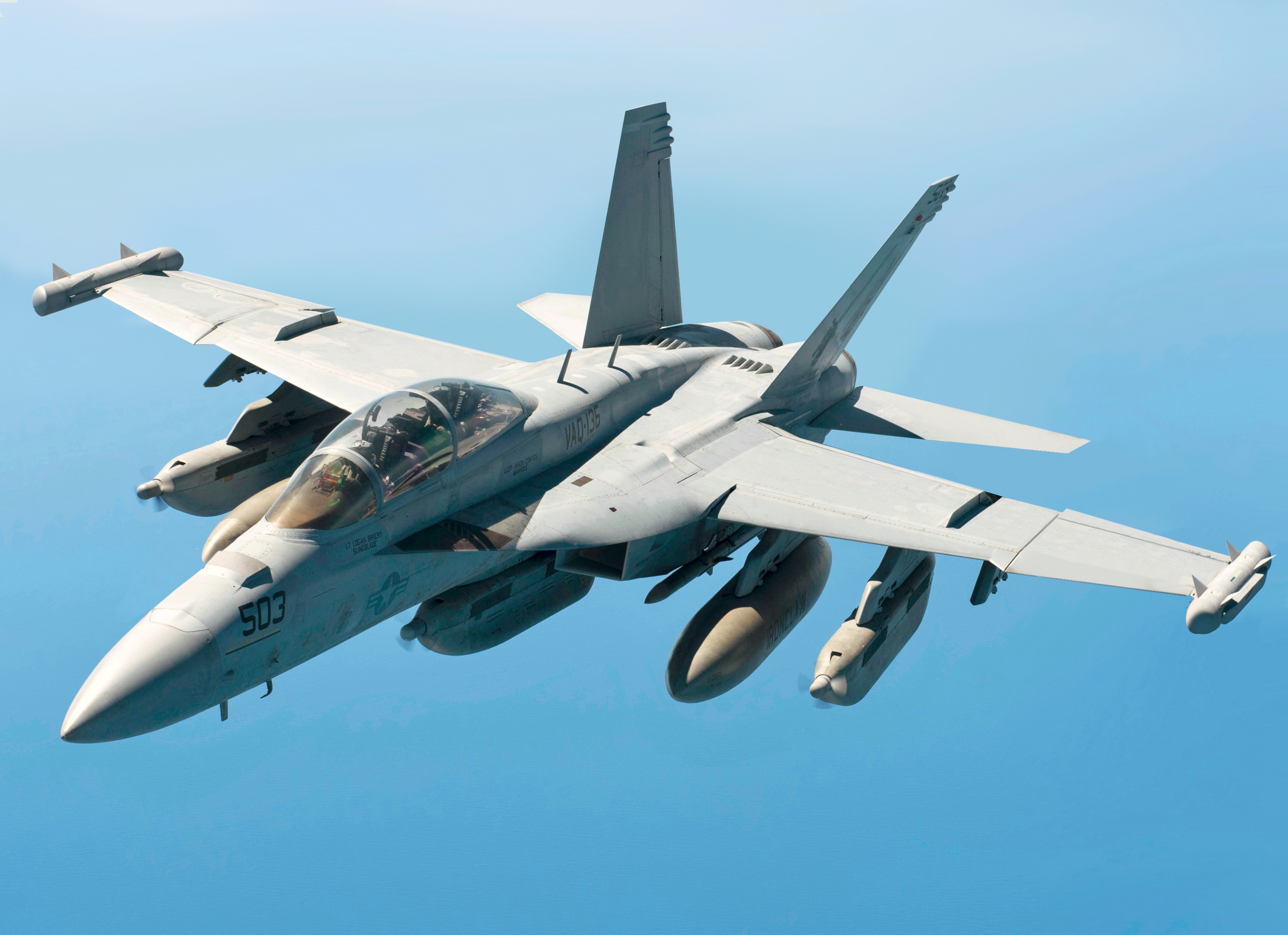
An EA-18G Growler of VAQ-136, May 2017

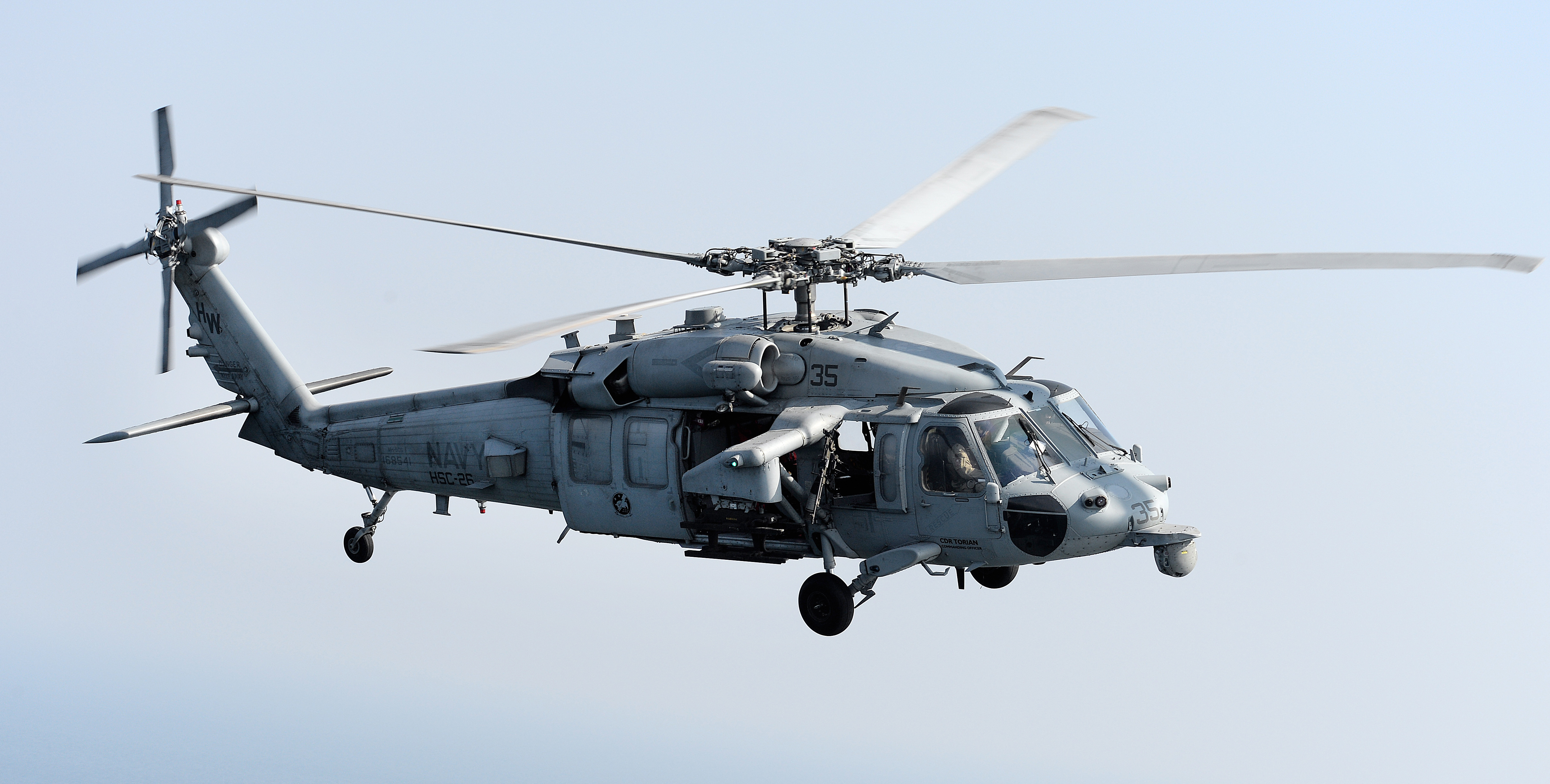
MH-60S Seahawk of HSC-26 armed for small boat defense, January 2014

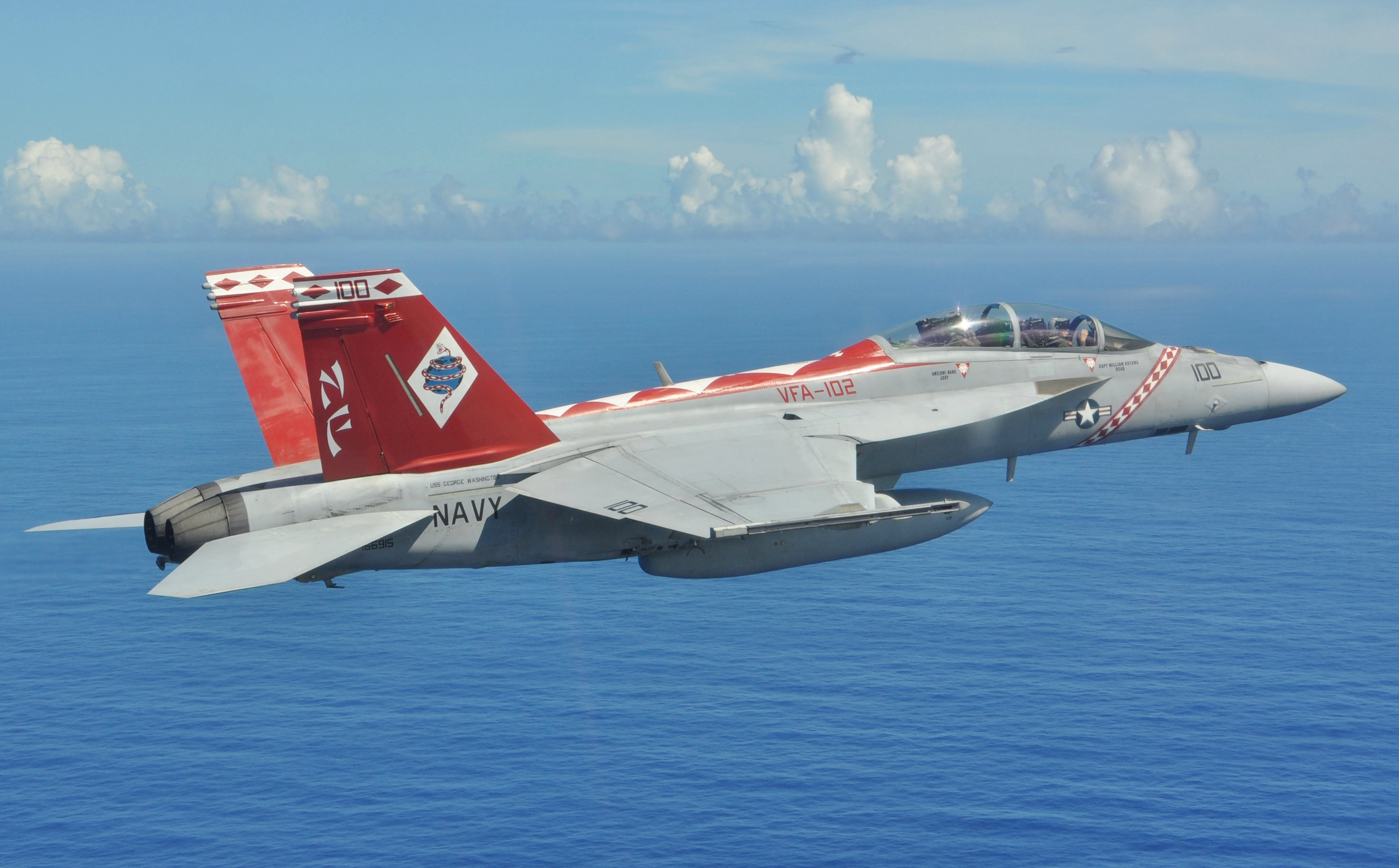
An F/A-18F Super Hornet assigned to VFA-102, May 2006

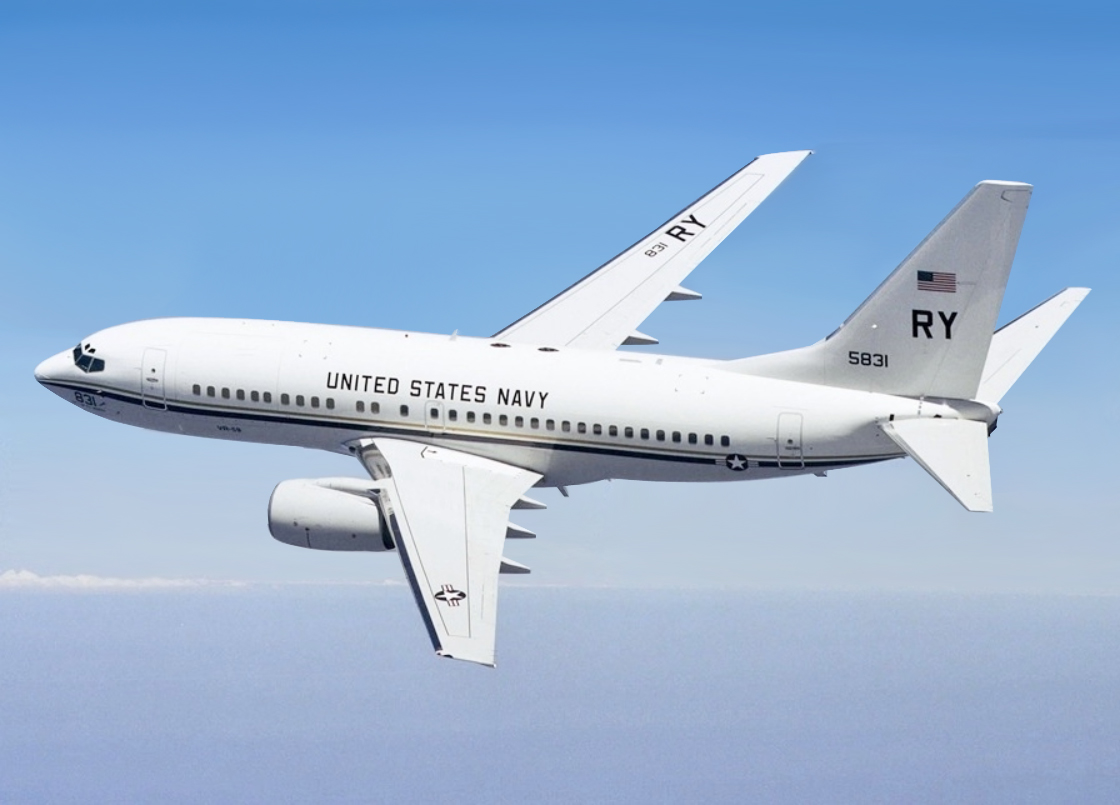
A C-40A Clipper from VR-59, August 2015

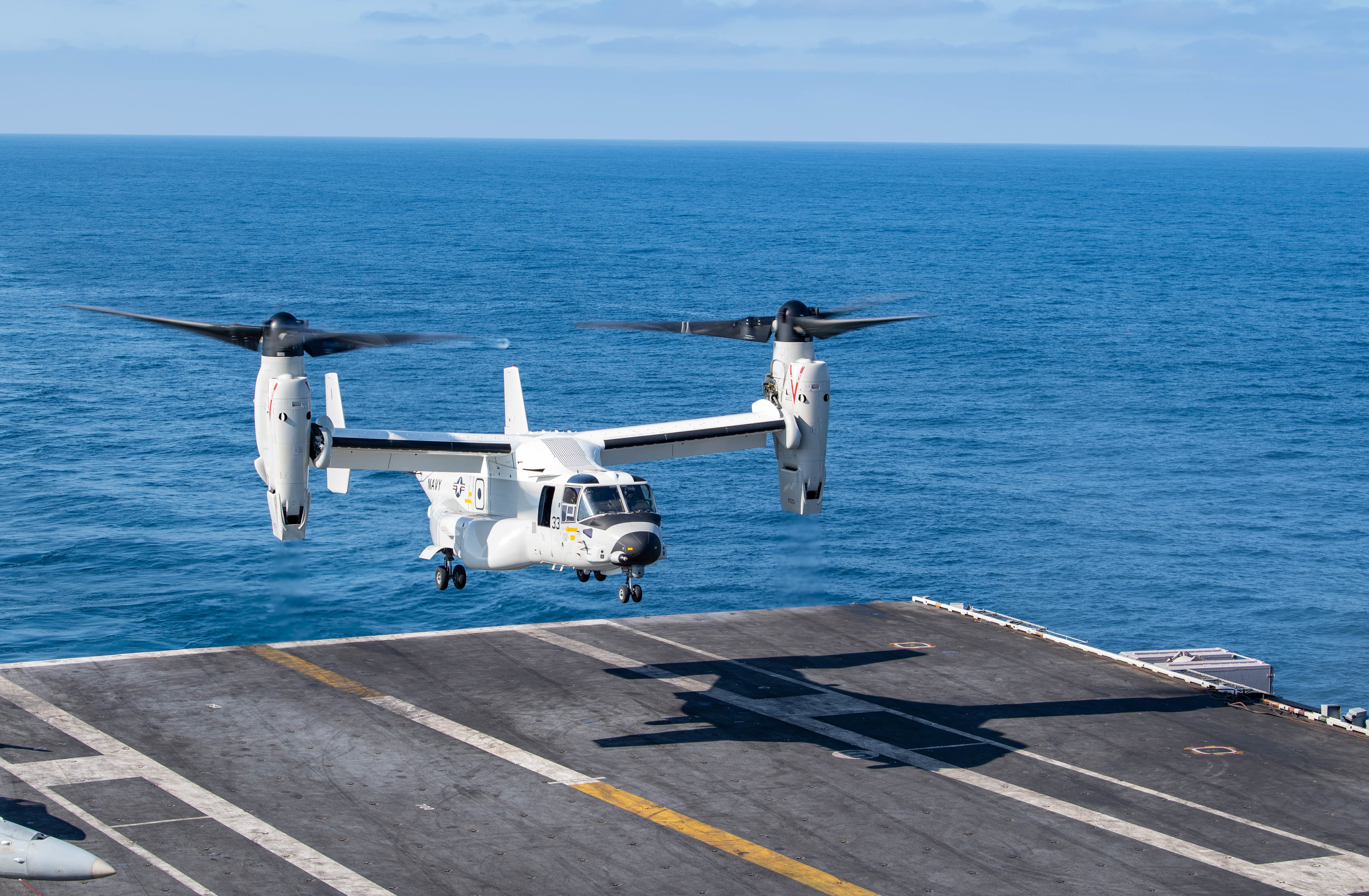
A CMV-22B Osprey from VRM-30, February 2021

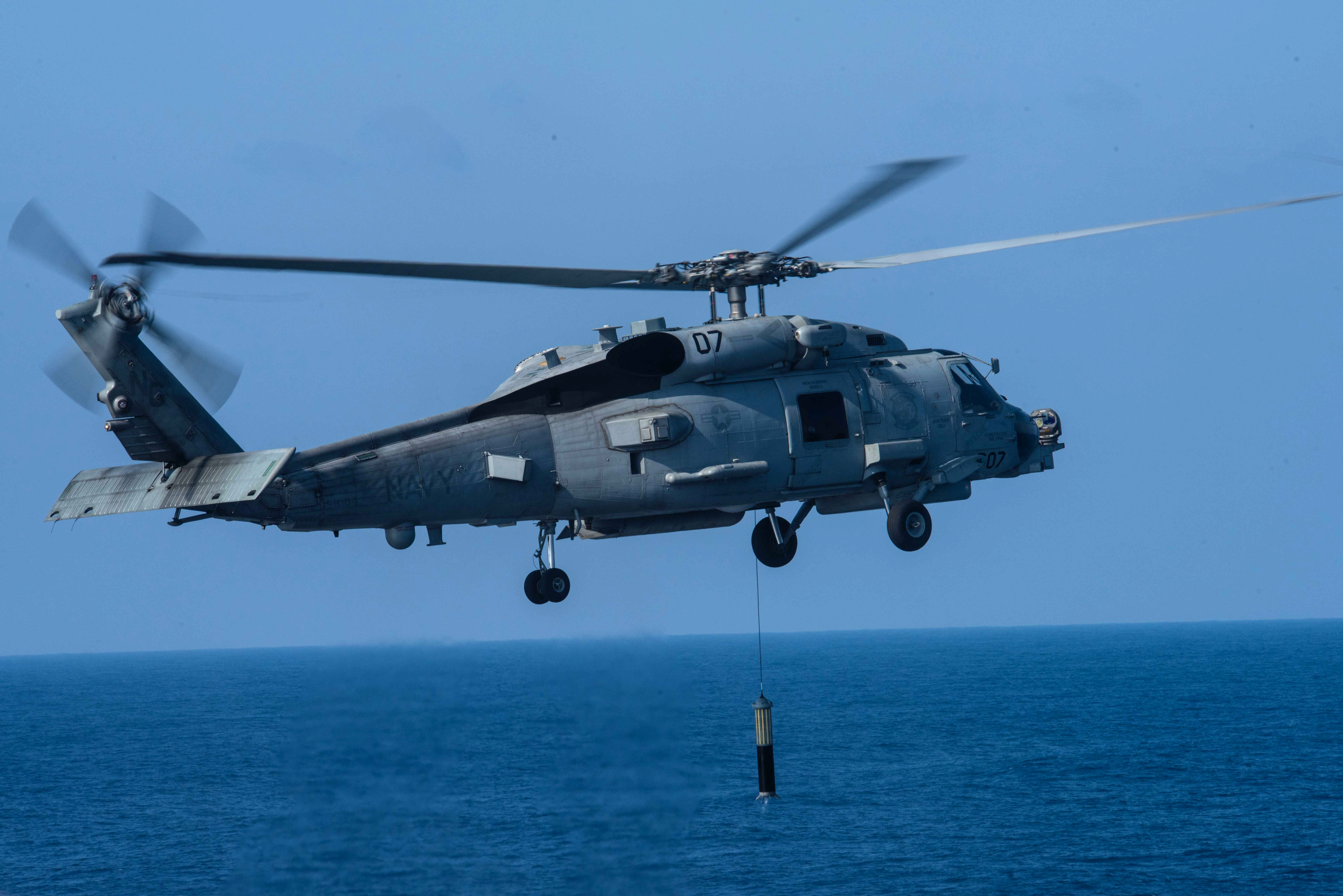
MH-60R Seahawk of HSM-71 lowers sonar, March 2016

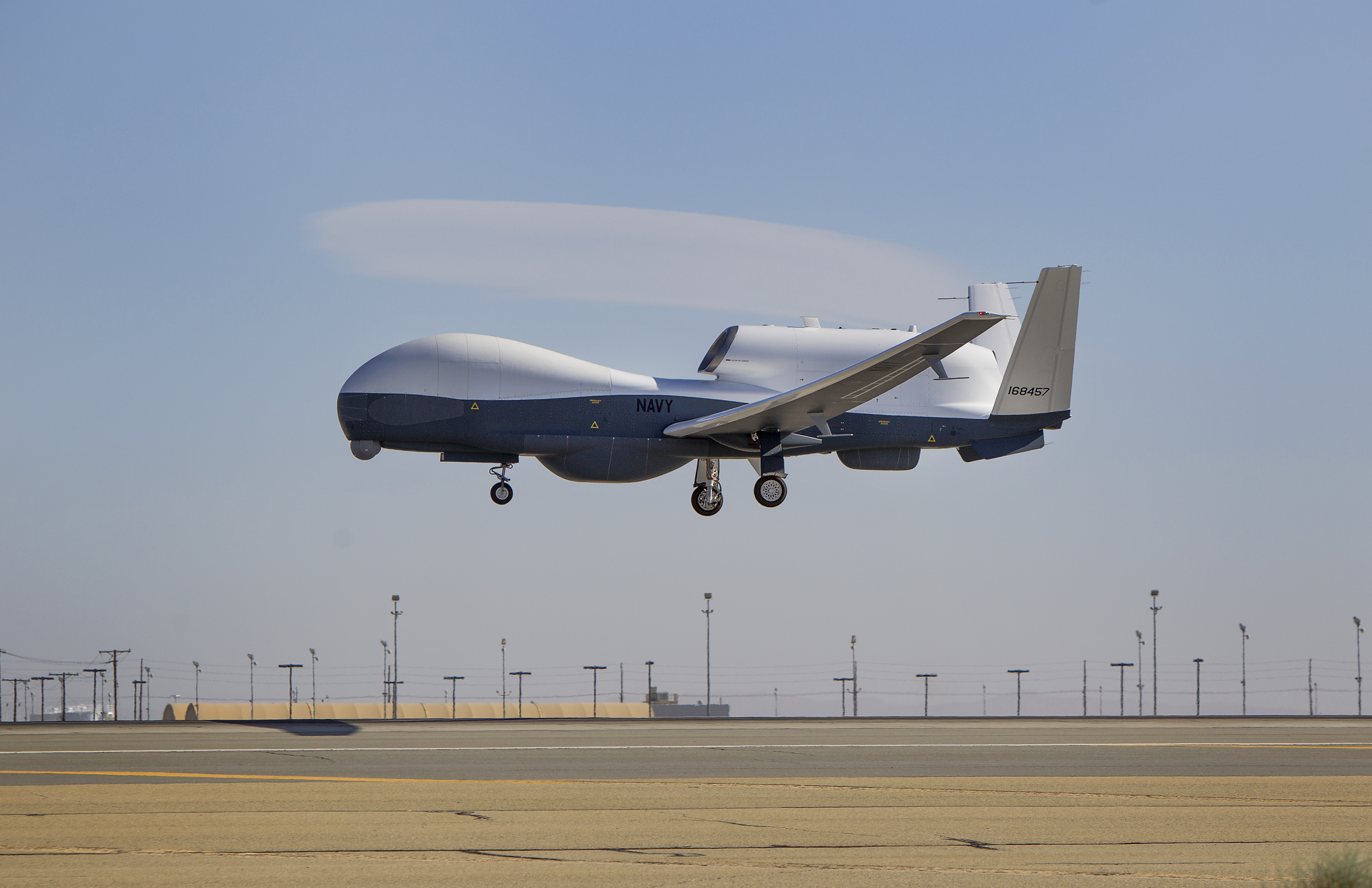
An MQ-4C Triton completes its first flight, May 2013

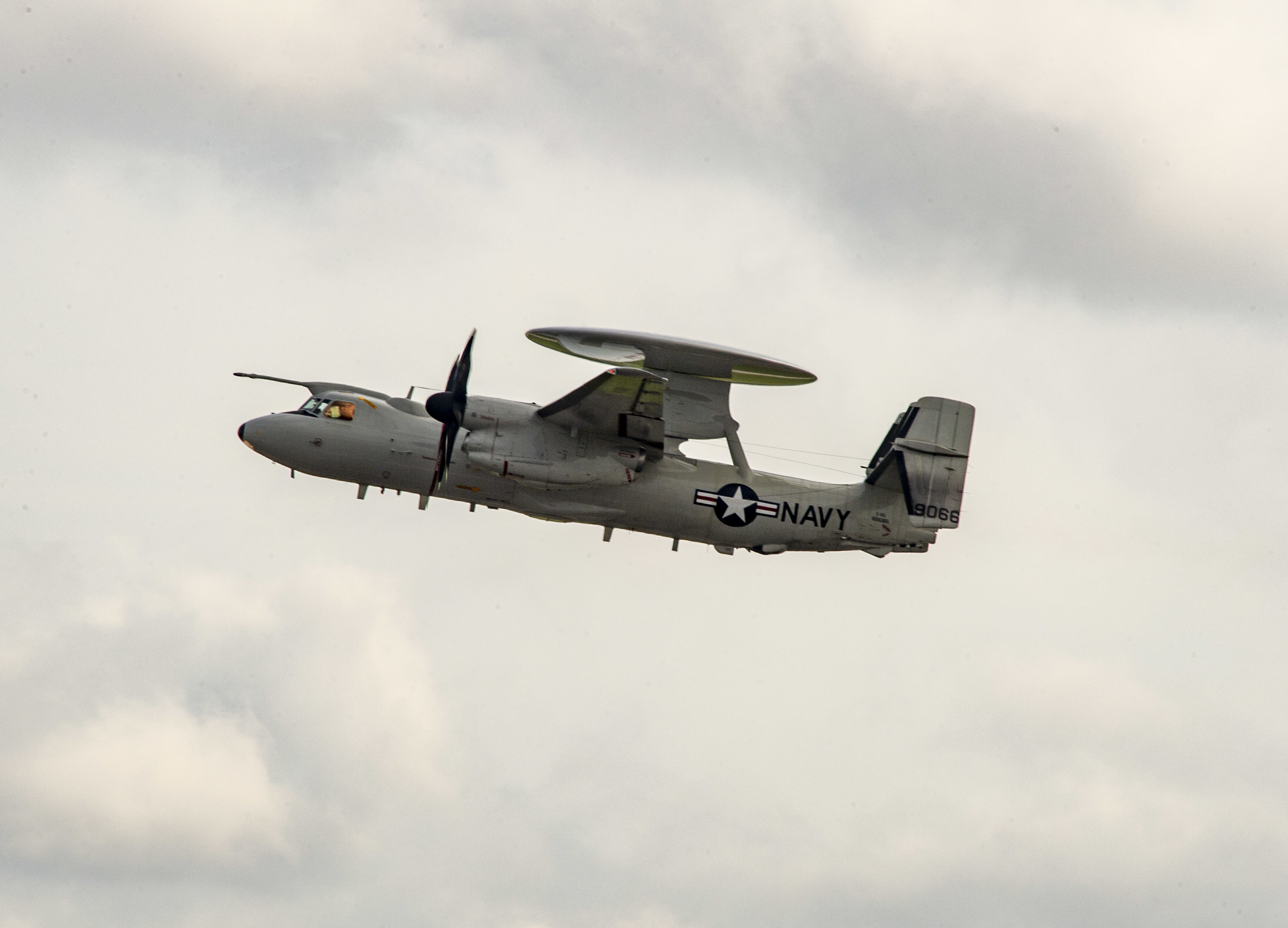
An E-2D Hawkeye of VAW-120, September 2019.

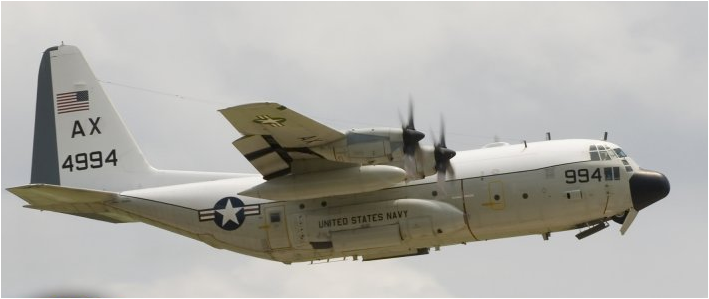
A C-130T Hercules from transport squadron VR-53.

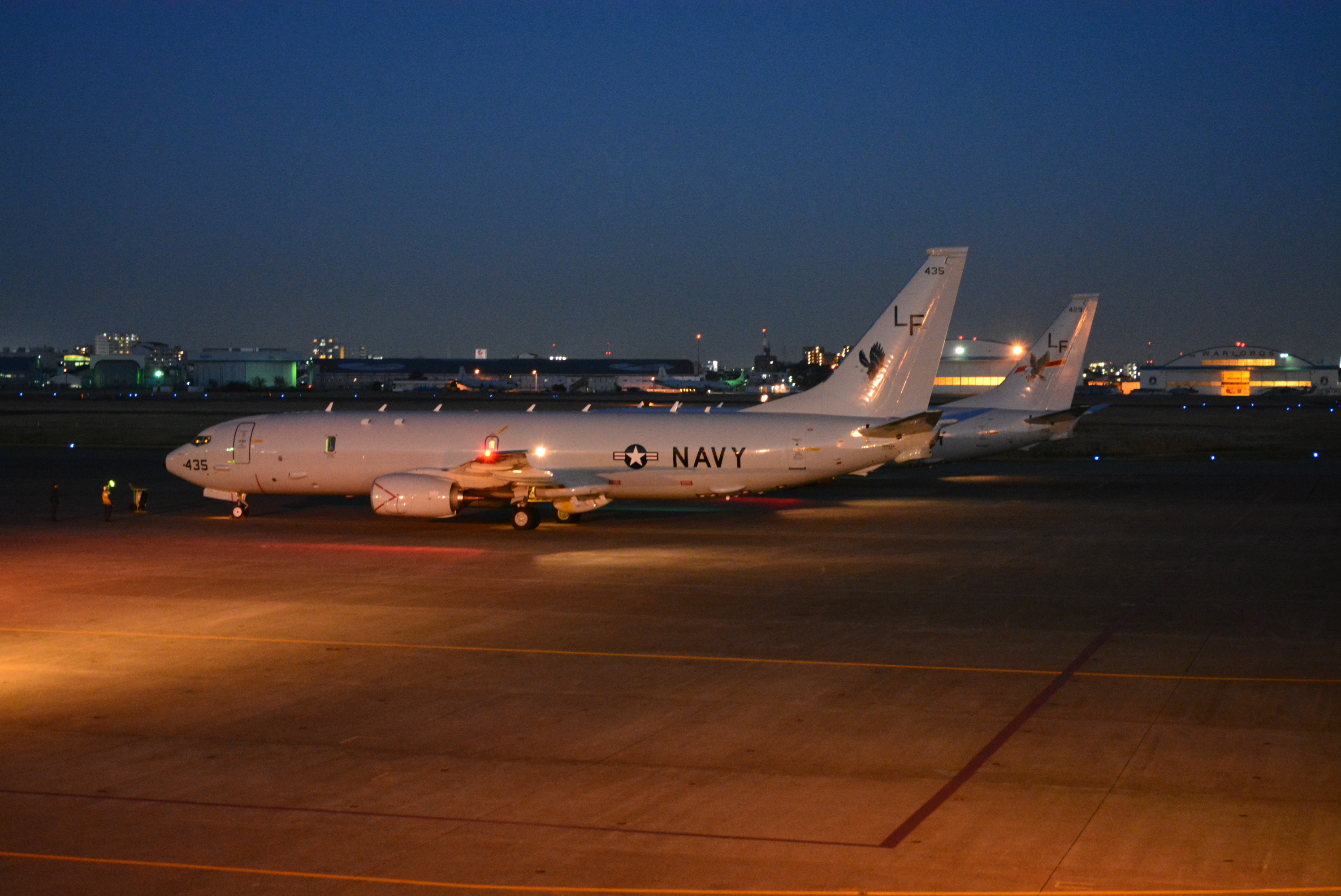
P-8A Poseidons of VP-16 refuel at NAF Atsugi, December 2013

== See also ==
- United States Marine Corps Aviation#Current inventory
- List of active United States Air Force aircraft
- United States Army Aviation Branch#Equipment
- List of equipment of the United States Coast Guard#Aircraft
- List of United States Navy aircraft squadrons
