= VQ-4 =

US Navy communications aircraft squadron

Fleet Air Reconnaissance Squadron 4
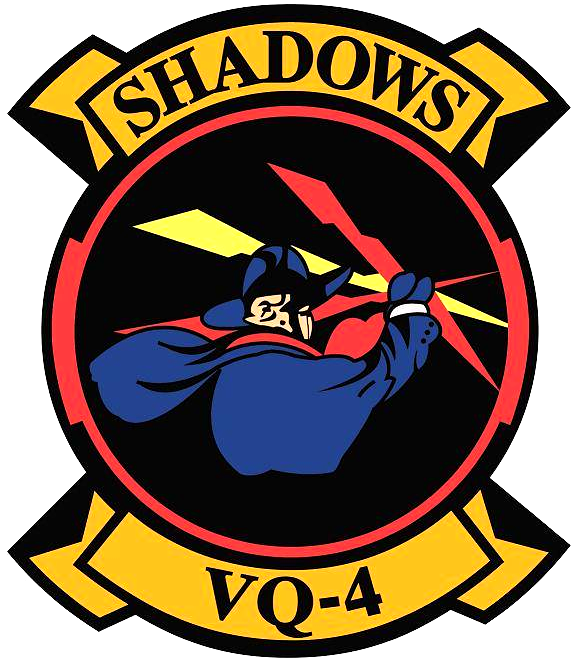
- VQ-4 insignia
- Active: 1 July 1968 - present
- Country: United States
- Branch: United States Navy
- Type: Fleet Air Reconnaissance
- Role: TACAMO
- Garrison/HQ: Tinker Air Force Base

Aircraft flown
- Reconnaissance: Lockheed EC-130G/Q Hercules; Boeing E-6 Mercury

Fleet Air Reconnaissance Squadron 4 (VQ-4), nicknamed the Shadows, is a naval aviation squadron of the United States Navy based at Tinker Air Force Base, Oklahoma. The squadron flies the Boeing E-6B Mercury airborne command post and communications relay aircraft. It is part of the U.S. Navy's TACAMO community, whose mission is to enable the president of the United States and the secretary of defense to directly communicate with U.S. submarines, bombers, and missile silos during a nuclear war.

== Operations ==
VQ-4 has a complement of 78 officers and 426 enlisted personnel. Since 1992, it has operated under Navy Strategic Communications Wing 1 at Tinker Air Force Base. It deploys aircraft to fly operational patrols out of NAS Patuxent River, Maryland. The acronym "TACAMO" stands for "TAke Charge And Move Out", supposedly the first operational directive given to the squadron at its inception.

== History ==
The TACAMO mission began in 1961 as a test program to determine if an airborne Very Low Frequency (VLF) communications system was feasible. Weapons Systems Test Division conducted this program, using a U.S. Marine Corps KC-130 aircraft as a test vehicle. The overwhelming success of the test program prompted funding for the first production aircraft. The project was designated TACAMO, which stands for "Take Charge and Move Out."

In order to avoid long lead-time delays, four U. S. Air Force C-130 aircraft were taken from the production line in early 1963. After extensive modification, the aircraft was designated a C-130G. The first of these aircraft, BUNO 151890, was delivered on 26 December 1963. At that time, the communications equipment consisted of removable vans that could be installed in a matter of hours. Plans were formulated in 1966 to expand the TACAMO Program. The expansion included permanently installing the communications suites in eight aircraft and their designation as EC-130Qs. On 1 July 1968, VQ-4 was established at NAS Patuxent River, MD as a permanent operational squadron.

In 1974, the next major aircraft modification incorporated a new power amplifier, a dual trailing wire antenna system and a high-speed reel system for deploying and retracting of the trailing wire antennas. Additional improvements included satellite communications and an enhanced VLF capability.

In the 1980s, it was recognized that the C-130s, in some cases the oldest in the fleet, were in need of replacement. The hunt was on for the successor to "The Mighty Herc." Eventually, the B707-320 airframe was chosen, modified extensively and designated the E-6A. The Navy E-6s were the last 16 aircraft to roll off of Boeing’s venerable 707 line after 30 years of production.

On 25 January 1991, VQ-4 took delivery of its first E-6A Mercury aircraft and in November 1992, changed homeport to Tinker AFB, Oklahoma City, Oklahoma. On 20 September 1999, VQ-4 took delivery of its first E-6B. The E-6B contains upgraded systems that enable it to perform the USSTRATCOM Airborne Command Post (ABNCP) "Looking Glass" mission. Upgrades include: a Battle staff module to provide enhanced command, control and communications for the Nation’s nuclear arsenal; the Airborne Launch Control System to permit airborne launch and control of ICBMs; UHF C3 Radio Subsystem; Digital Airborne Intercommunications Switching System; MILSTAR Airborne Terminal System (Satellite communications) and a High Power Transmit Set for enhanced communications.

Since its commissioning, VQ-4 evolved into a squadron of approximately 400 officers and enlisted personnel, making it one of the largest operational aviation squadrons in the Navy. At one point the squadron surpassed 42 years and 380,000 flight hours of Class A mishap-free operations.

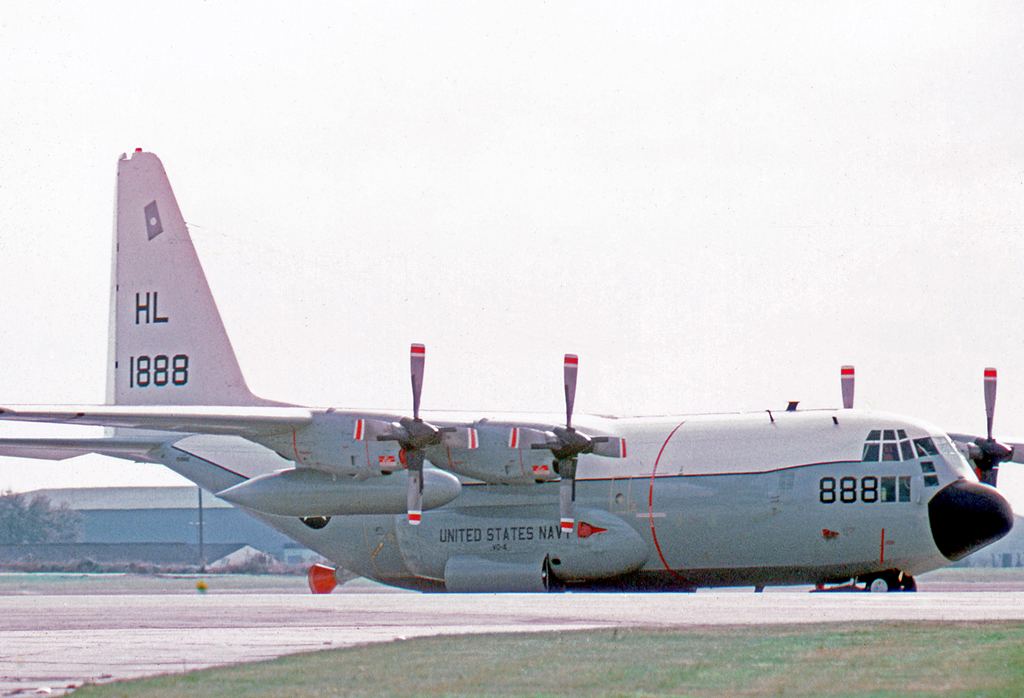
Lockheed EC-130G Hercules of VQ-4 visiting RAF Mildenhall England in 1972.

From 1968, the squadron first operated the EC-130G Hercules aircraft, a specially modified radio relay version of the Lockheed C-130 Hercules aircraft. It was based at both NAS Patuxent River, Maryland, and NAS Agana, Guam. In the late 1970s, the squadron based at NAS Agana relocated to NAS Barbers Point, Hawaii. In the mid 1980s, the squadron based at NAS Patuxent River began receiving EC-130Q aircraft, transferring the older EC-130G aircraft to the squadron based at Barbers Point. Both squadrons transitioned to the E-6A Hermes in 1991–92, and co-located at Tinker Air Force Base in 1992.
