= SNC E-4C Survivable Airborne Operations Center =

Planned US Air Force airborne nuclear command, control, and communications aircraft

E-4C Survivable Airborne Operations Center

General information
- Type: Airborne strategic command and control post
- Manufacturer: Sierra Nevada Corporation
- Status: In development
- Primary user: United States Air Force

History
- Introduction date: 2032 (planned)
- Developed from: Boeing 747-8I

The E-4C Survivable Airborne Operations Center (SAOC) is a United States Air Force program to develop a replacement for the E-4B National Airborne Operations Center (NAOC), a strategic command-and-control military aircraft used as a mobile command post for the National Command Authority in emergency situations.

The current E-4 platforms were built in the 1970s. The airframes are reaching the end of their operational lifespans and support costs are increasing. Because of this, in 2019, the USAF began a program to develop a new platform. This program will take several years to complete. The E-4s will continue to fulfill the role in the meantime.

In 2024, Sierra Nevada Corporation (SNC) was selected to develop the aircraft. The aircraft will be based on the 747-8I, with SNC collaborating with General Electric.

== Development ==
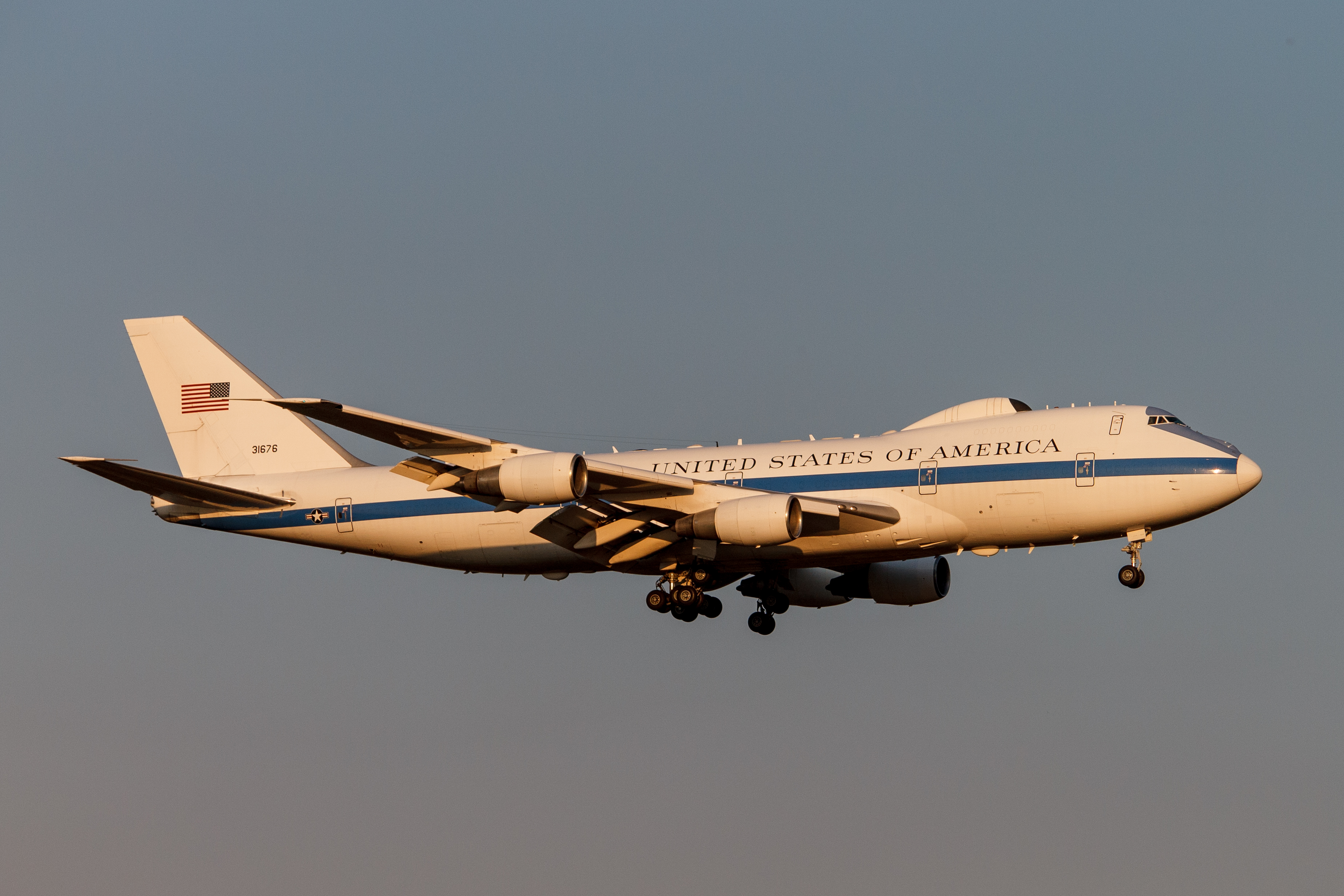
A Boeing E-4 Advanced Airborne Command Post

The program began in 2019. The age issues regarding the E-4 platform were recognized much earlier. In 2006, then-defense secretary Donald Rumsfeld attempted to retire the aircraft due to its age, with the first plane scheduled for retirement in 2009.

In 2007, with no capable replacement, Rumsfeld's successor, Robert Gates, overturned the decision and kept all the planes in the fleet. The E-4B airframe has a usable life of 115,000 hours and 30,000 cycles, which will be reached in 2039. The maintenance limiting point will occur sometime in the 2020s.

Like the B-21 Raider, the USAF expects to take advantage of off-the-shelf commercial products and digital design to a greater degree than in previous projects, to streamline development and reduce acquisition costs by relying less on bespoke components.

Operational status is not expected until the 2030s. In March 2023, USAF Gen. Thomas Bussiere testified to the United States House of Representatives Armed Services Committee that "the SAOC will achieve FOC (full operating capability) in the early to mid-2030s." A US Senate report on the FY2024 National Defense Authorization Act (NDAA) includes a section on the SAOC wherein the Armed Services Committee "encourages the Secretary to maintain the current recapitalization schedule in order to replace the aging fleet and field the more capable aircraft by the 2032 required assets available date".

In August 2023, Sierra Nevada Corporation (SNC) announced the construction of large, 90,000 square feet (8,400 m^{2}) maintenance, repair, and overhaul hangars in Dayton, Ohio, as a part of their bid for the SAOC contract. SNC released renderings of the hangars with Boeing 747-8s in them, indicating that the 747-8 was the likely platform for the SAOC.

In August 2024, the project received the designation E-4C.

=== Funding ===
Since the FY2021 NDAA, Congress has appropriated nearly $300 million in development funds, including $76.4 million for the first contracts in 2021. The Air Force requested substantially greater funding in FY2024, asking for $888.8 million. As of the FY2024 funding request, the program is expected to cost $8.3 billion between FY2022 to FY2028.

=== Selection process ===
A Boeing 747-8I operating under Korean Air colors before it was purchased by SNC for SAOC conversion.

In August 2023, Sierra Nevada Corporation (SNC) was reported to be bidding for the contract, on a platform assumed to entail data and communication modifications to a number of used 747-8 airframes.

In December 2023, Boeing was eliminated from the bidding process after refusing to agree to a fixed-price contract, leaving SNC unopposed in the selection process.

In April 2024, Sierra Nevada Corporation was awarded a $13 billion contract for five aircraft, with the contract expected to be completed by 2036. In May 2024, Sierra Nevada announced the purchase of five Boeing 747-8s from Korean Air for conversion, to be delivered for modification work by September 2025. In August 2025, flight testing of the first aircraft began.

== Design ==
Details about the design have not been publicly released, partially due to the classified nature of its mission but also because the project is still in development. The Air Force described its mission in the FY2024 budget request:

The Survivable Airborne Operations Center (SAOC) will replace the aging E-4B fleet which faces capability gaps, diminishing manufacturing sources, increased maintenance costs, and parts obsolescence as it approaches the end of its serviceable life. SAOC will provide POTUS, SECDEF and the CJCS a worldwide, survivable, and enduring node of the National Military Command System (NMCS) to fulfill national security requirements throughout all stages of conflict. As a command, control and communications center directing US forces, executing emergency war orders and coordinating the activities of civil authorities including national contingency plans, this capability ensures continuity of operations and continuity of government as required in a national emergency or after negation/destruction of ground command and control centers. SAOC will fulfill the requirements of the AF Nuclear Mission by providing Nuclear Command, Control and Communications (NC3) capabilities to enable the exercise of authority and direction by the President to command and control US military nuclear weapons operations.

While the project was in the early stages in 2023, some of the existing requirements seemed to rule out any aircraft platform except the Boeing 747-8. In 2022, Col. Brian Golden said:

You need a very large, four-engine aircraft to execute our mission set. There was a lot of discussion on: Could it be done on two engines? Partly. A lot of risk would have to be taken, and it wasn’t the Air Force’s risk to take.

This statement seemed to strongly suggest that the Air Force would again turn to the Boeing 747, the only US-made four-engine airliner built in the several years prior. It was also the only aircraft based on a four-engine airliner platform built in the US since the last new-build E-3 Sentry and E-6 Mercury aircraft (both based on the Boeing 707 platform) were delivered in 1991. The only other four-engine airliner in recent construction was the Airbus A380, but production for that ended in 2021. The Air Force is generally reluctant to use aircraft not built in the United States, especially for highly sensitive missions such as the SAOC will take on.

While 747-8 production ended in January 2023, the Air Force left open the possibility of purchasing used aircraft. Col. Golden said that a new aircraft wouldn't be necessary, making acquisition of a used 747-8 a possibility.

You don’t have to buy a brand-new aircraft. It’s not like a car... You can buy an older aircraft—a few years old, five years old, it doesn’t matter—and the engineers will strip it down and build it back up.

The FY2024 budget justification included an expectation that the contractor would "buy the required aircraft, bring each aircraft to a common configuration, make required modifications, develop and integrate the mission system into each aircraft, provide required ground support systems and conduct contract support operations for fielded systems until Operations and Support Phase."

The Defense Department looked at the possibility of merging the capabilities of the US Navy's Boeing E-6 Mercury, then the only aircraft with nuclear command-and-control capabilities, into the SAOC so that the roles of both the E-4B and the E-6 are handled by one aircraft. This would also address the age of the Boeing 707 platform upon which the E-6 is based, which first flew in the 1950s. However, the Navy chose to replace the E-6 Mercury with the E-130J.

The E-130J will continue the E-6's TACAMO mission, but will drop the ICBM command-and-control capabilities of the E-6. Those capabilities will be integrated into the SAOC.

Planned capabilities have not been publicly discussed in great detail, but the program requirements include:

- Aerial refueling capability to enable sustained airborne operations
- Hardening against electromagnetic pulse (EMP) and nuclear effects
- Nuclear Command, Control, and Communications (NC^{3}) capabilities
- Secure communications and planning capabilities based on a Modular Open System Approach (MOSA)

=== Technological enhancements and capabilities ===
The SNC E-4C Survivable Airborne Operations Center (SAOC) is designed to incorporate advanced technologies that enhance its operational capabilities in various scenarios. A significant feature is its hardening against electromagnetic pulse (EMP) effects, which ensures that critical systems remain operational even after a nuclear event. This capability is crucial for maintaining command and control during national emergencies.

The SAOC will include secure communication systems and air refueling capabilities, allowing it to operate for extended periods without needing to land, thereby increasing its effectiveness as a mobile command center.

== See also ==
- TACAMO – US strategic communications system
- Airborne Launch Control System – US Strategic Command platform

Related development

- Boeing 747 – American wide-body four-engined jet long-range aircraft
- Boeing VC-25 – US Air Force presidential transport aircraft

Aircraft of comparable role, configuration, and era

- Boeing E-4 – US Air Force airborne command squadron aircraft
- Boeing E-6 Mercury – Airborne command post aircraft by Boeing based on 707 airframe
- Doomsday plane (Russia) – Russian Airborne Command Post
- Ilyushin Il-80 – Russian airborne command post aircraft based on Il-86 airliner
- Lockheed Martin E-130J – Planned US Navy airborne command post
- Northrop Grumman E-10 MC2A – Proposed Airborne Warning and Control aircraft based on the Boeing 767 airframe

Related lists

- List of active United States military aircraft
