= Boeing E-6 Mercury =

Airborne command post aircraft by Boeing based on 707 airframe

E-6 Mercury
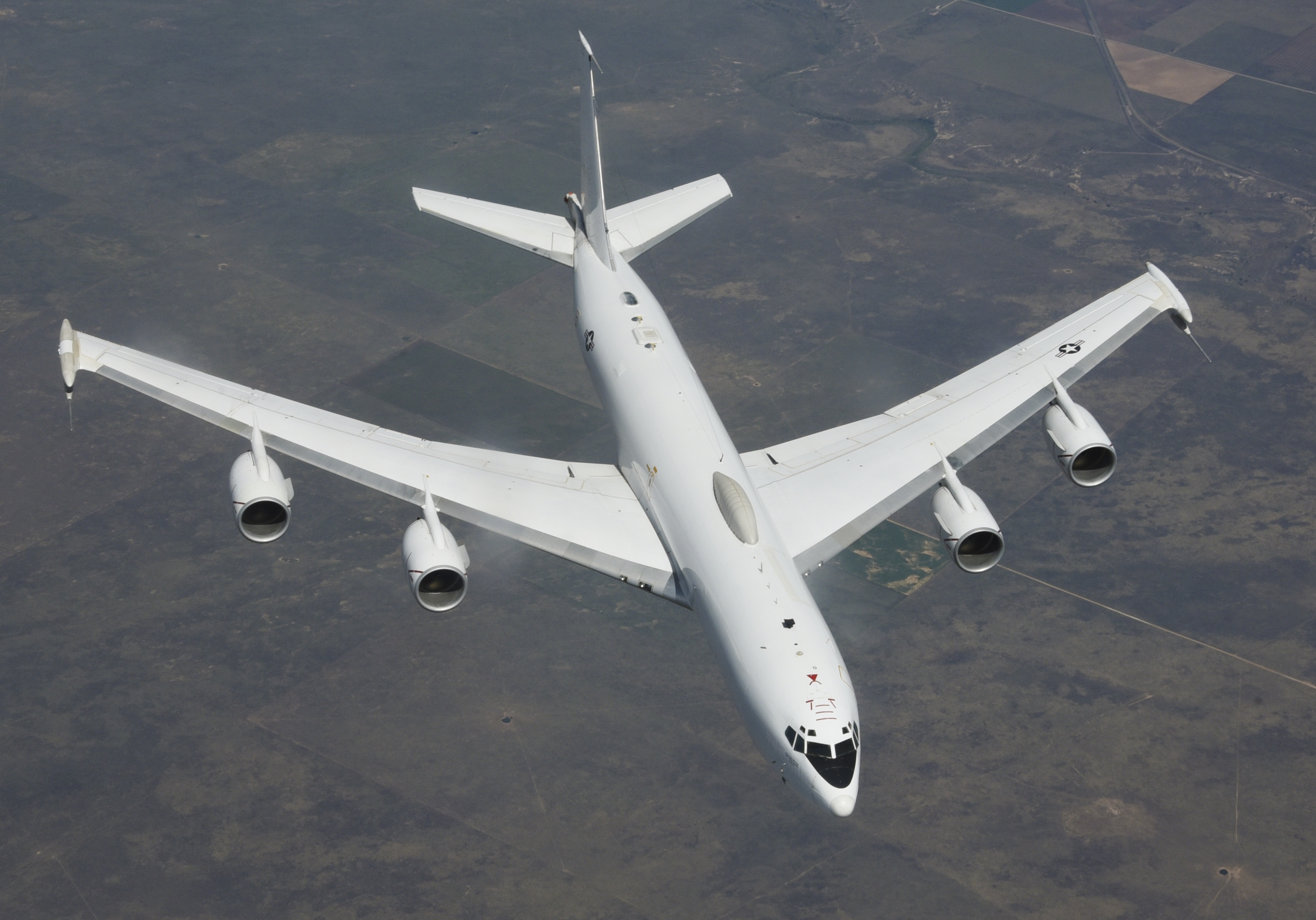
- Boeing E-6 Mercury

General information
- Type: Airborne command and control
- Manufacturer: Boeing
- Status: In service
- Primary user: United States Navy
- Number built: 16

History
- Introduction date: August 1989
- First flight: 19 February 1987
- Developed from: Boeing 707

The Boeing E-6 Mercury (formerly E-6 Hermes) is an airborne command post and communications relay based on the Boeing 707-300. The original E-6A manufactured by Boeing's defense division entered service with the United States Navy in July 1989, replacing the EC-130Q. This platform, now modified to the E-6B standard, conveys instructions from the National Command Authority to fleet ballistic missile submarines (see communication with submarines), a mission known as TACAMO ("Take Charge And Move Out").

The E-6B model deployed in October 1998 has the ability to remotely control Minuteman ICBMs using the Airborne Launch Control System. The E-6B replaced Air Force EC-135Cs in the Looking Glass role, providing command and control of U.S. nuclear forces should ground-based control become inoperable. With production lasting until 1991, the E-6 was the final new derivative of the Boeing 707 to be built.

== Design and development ==
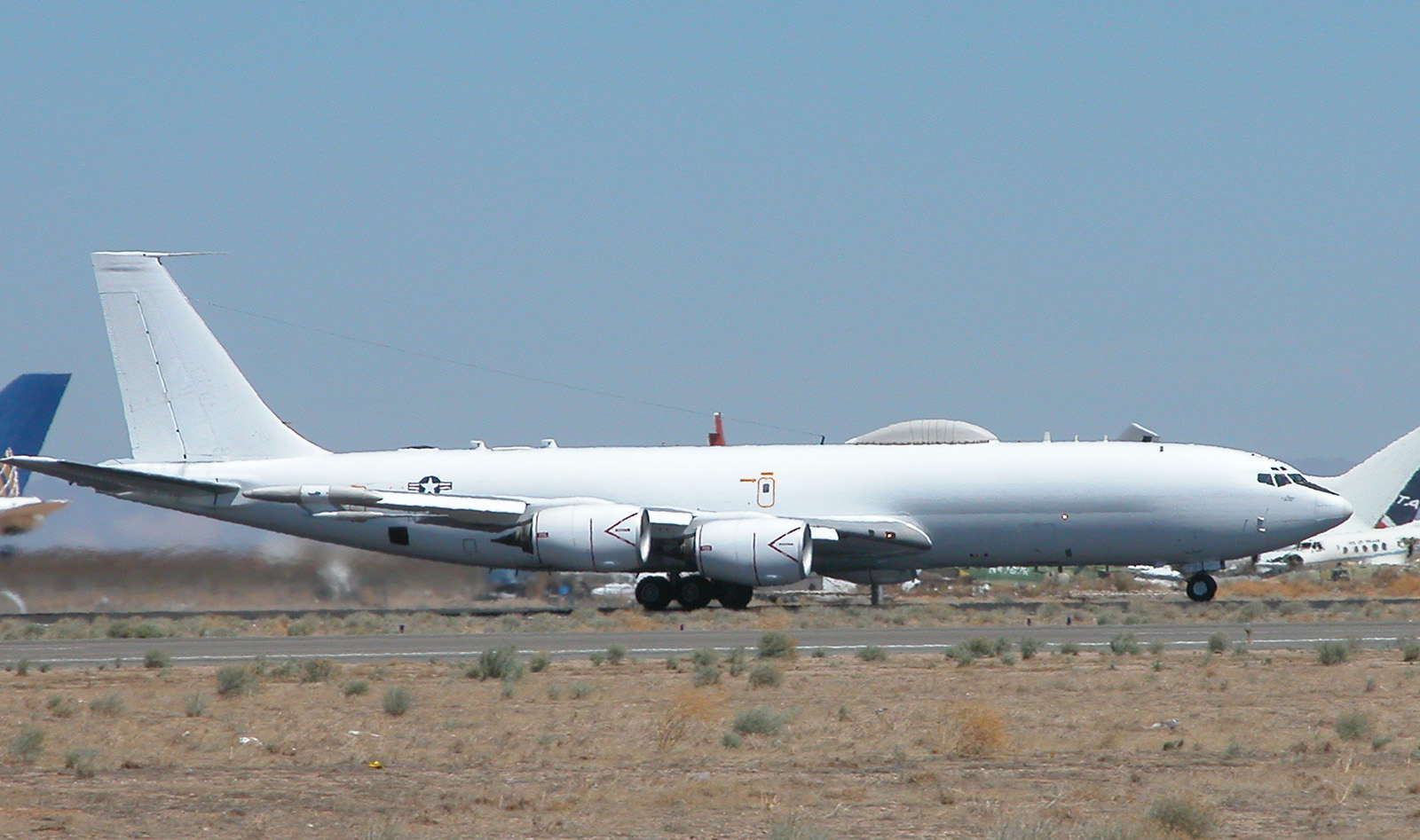
A Navy E-6B Mercury at the Mojave Air and Space Port

Like the E-3 Sentry Airborne Warning and Control System aircraft, the E-6 is adapted from Boeing's 707-320 airliner. Rolled out at Boeing's Renton Factory in December 1986, the first E-6 made its maiden flight in February 1987, when it was flown to nearby Boeing Field in south Seattle for fitting of mission avionics. In July 1988, it was delivered to the Navy for testing.

The E-6B is an upgrade of the E-6A. It includes a battle staff area and updated mission equipment. The flight deck systems were later replaced with a better, cheaper off-the-shelf 737 Next Generation cockpit. The first E-6B was accepted in December 1997. All 16 E-6A aircraft were modified to the E-6B standard, with the final delivery taking place in December 2006.

Unlike most Navy aircraft that use the probe-and-drogue in-flight refueling method, the E-6 has a flying boom receptacle on the upper-forward fuselage so it can be refueled by the U.S. Air Force’s larger tanker fleet of KC-135 Stratotankers and KC-46 Pegasuses.

== Operational history ==
Codenamed Looking Glass, the E-6 is United States Strategic Command's (USSTRATCOM) Airborne Command Post (ABNCP). It is designed to take over should the Global Operations Center at Offutt Air Force Base, Nebraska be incapable of communicating with nuclear forces. The term "Looking Glass” reflects the way the ABNCP "mirrors" the GOC's abilities.

In August 1989, the E-6A, initially named Hermes, entered service with squadron VQ-3. In January 1991, a second squadron, VQ-4, received its first E-6As, allowing the EC-130Q to be phased out in June 1991. In autumn 1991, the E-6A was renamed Mercury at the Navy's request. Sixteen E-6A planes were delivered from 1988 to 1992.

The E-6 fleet is based at Tinker Air Force Base, Oklahoma, and operated by Fleet Air Reconnaissance Squadron 3 (VQ-3), VQ-4, and VQ-7.

In 2021, one of the E-3D Sentry aircraft in service with the Royal Air Force was purchased for conversion into a dedicated E-6 trainer. This was done to extend the life of the operational fleet by reducing the need for E-6s to be used for training missions. In May 2025, the project was canceled, and a new contract was issued to Northrop Grumman for the salvage of spare parts and eventual scrapping of the airframe.

=== Replacement ===
In 2015, both the Air Force and Navy realised that they needed new aircraft to serve the missions of both the E-4 and the E-6. At one point, they considered building one plane to replace both aircraft. In 2020, the Navy developed an aircraft specifically for the TACAMO mission, under the E-XX TACAMO program. The Air Force independently pursued an E-4 replacement under the Survivable Airborne Operations Center program.

The Navy selected a variant of the Lockheed EC-130J, derived from the lengthened C-130J-30. In late 2020, initial orders were placed, with development beginning in earnest in 2022. Delivery of the first aircraft is expected in FY26. The Navy expects the E-6 to fulfill the TACAMO role into the 2030s as the E-XX is transitioned into service.

In October 2024, the replacement aircraft was officially named E-130J.

== Specifications (E-6B) ==
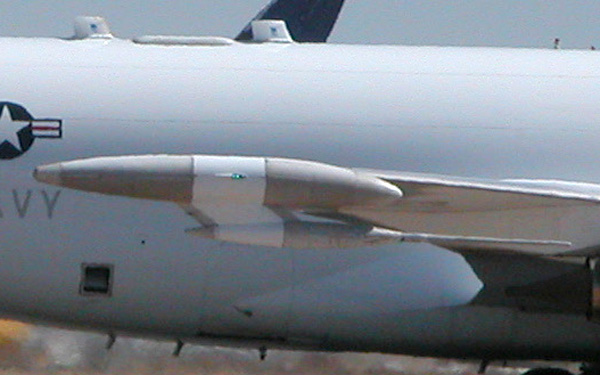
Detail of the E-6's wingtip

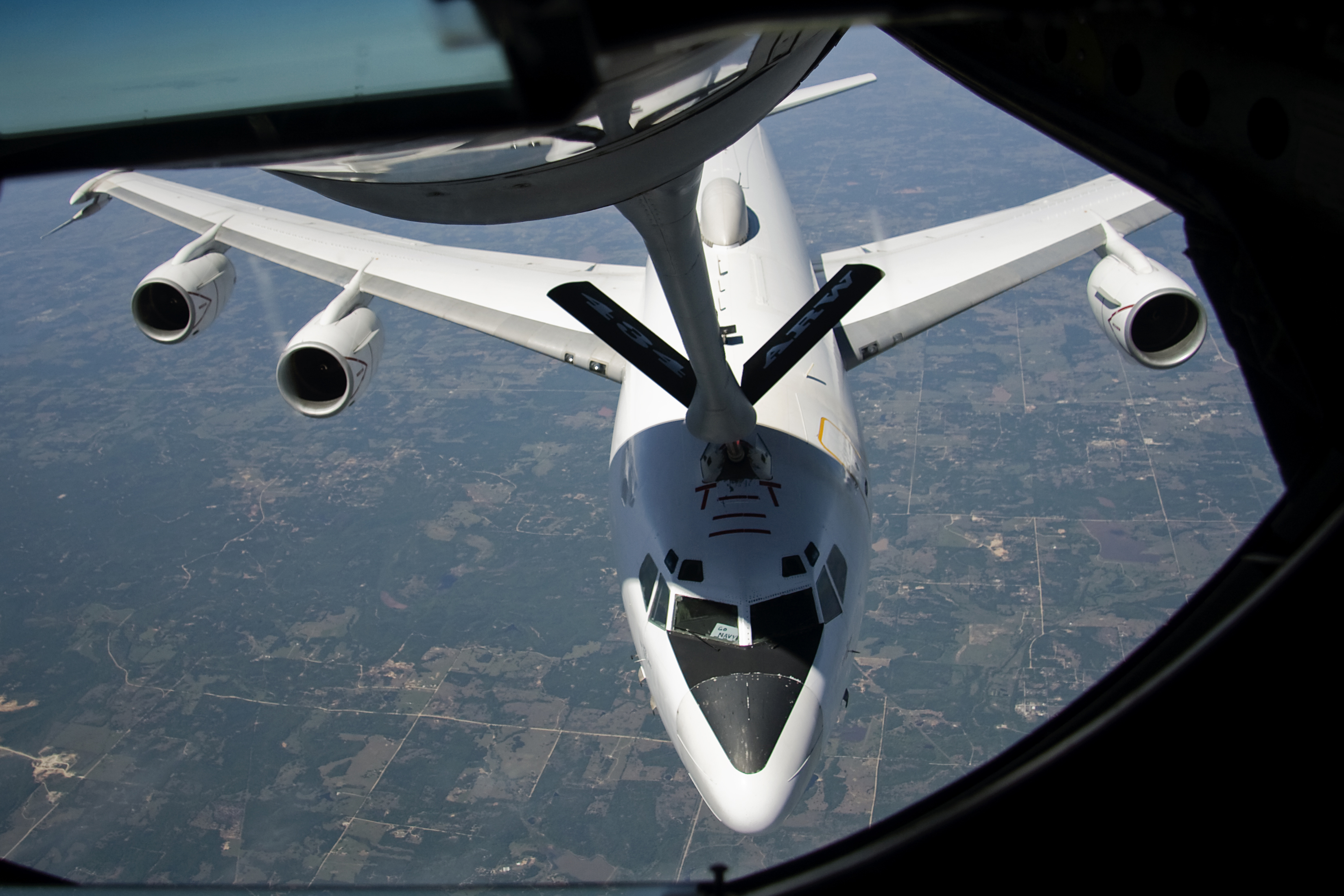
A U.S. Navy E-6B Mercury refuels from a USAF 434th Air Refueling Wing KC-135R Stratotanker, 2011

Data from Jane's all the world's aircraft, 1992–93 The US Navy – Fact File: E-6B Mercury Airborne Command Post

General characteristics

- Crew: 22
- Length: 150 ft 4 in (45.82 m)
- Wingspan: 148 ft 4 in (45.21 m)
- Height: 42 ft 5 in (12.93 m)
- Wing area: 3,050 sq ft (283 m^{2})
- Empty weight: 172,795 lb (78,378 kg)
- Max takeoff weight: 342,000 lb (155,129 kg)
- Powerplant: 4 × CFM International CFM56-2A-2 turbofan engines

Performance

- Maximum speed: 522 kn (601 mph, 967 km/h) dash speed
- Cruise speed: 455 kn (524 mph, 843 km/h) at 40,000 ft (12,192 m)
- Range: 6,600 nmi (7,600 mi, 12,200 km)
- Combat range: 6,350 nmi (7,310 mi, 11,760 km)
- Endurance: on station at 1,000 nmi (1,200 mi; 1,900 km)
  - 10 hours 30 minutes unrefueled
  - 28 hours 54 minutes with one refueling
  - 72 hours maximum with multiple refuelings
- Service ceiling: 40,000 ft (12,000 m)
- Wing loading: 112.13 lb/sq ft (547.5 kg/m^{2})
- Thrust/weight: 0.281
- Critical field length: 6,700 ft (2,042 m)
- Max effort take-off run: 5,400 ft (1,646 m)
- Landing run at max landing weight: 2,600 ft (792 m)

Avionics

- AN/ARC-182 VHF/UHF TxRx
- AN/ARC-190 HF
- AN/AIC-32 Crew Intercom
- triplex Litton LTN-90
- LTN-211 VLF/Omega
- Smiths SFM 02 digital/analog flight management system
- AN/APS-133 color weather radar

== See also ==
Related development

- Boeing 707
- Airborne Launch Control System

Aircraft of comparable role, configuration, and era

- Boeing E-4
- Boeing EC-135
- Northrop Grumman E-10 MC2A
- Ilyushin Il-80
- Tupolev Tu-142MR

Related lists

- List of active United States military aircraft
