= Lockheed Martin E-130J =

Planned US Navy airborne command post

E-130J Phoenix II
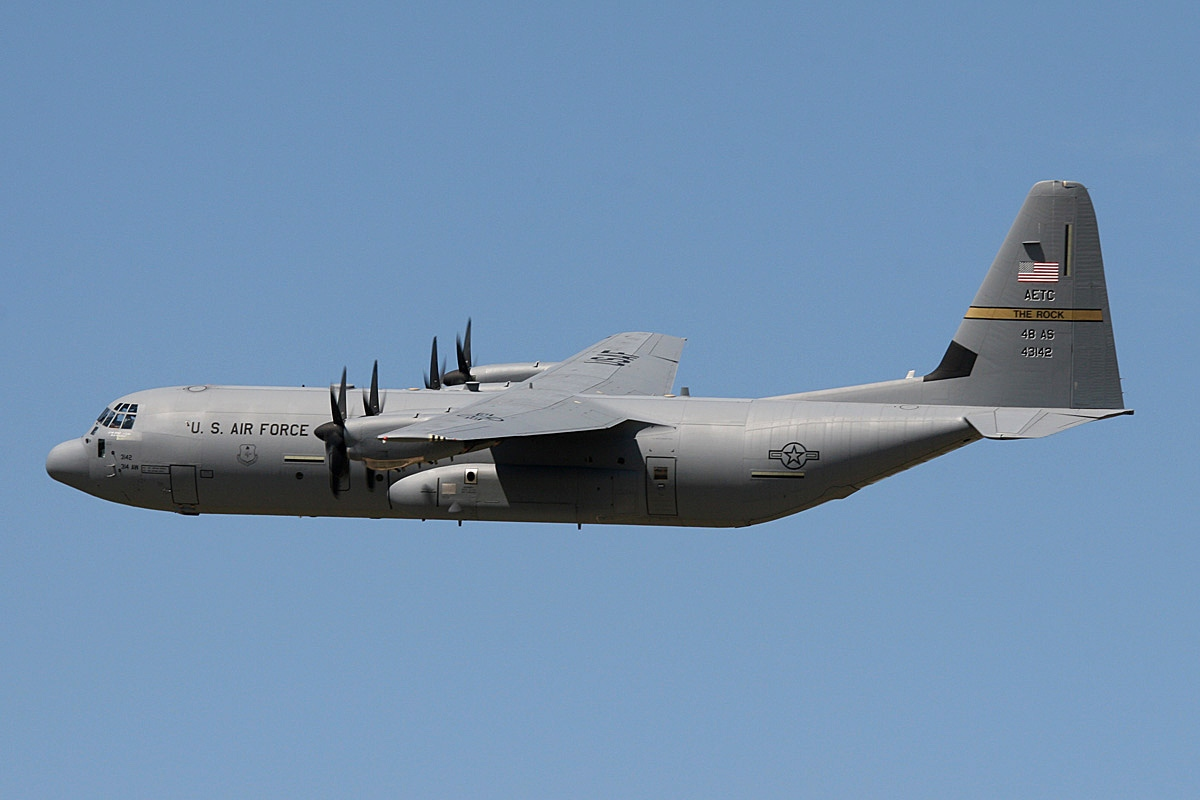
- The C-130J-30 airframe serves as the platform for the E-130J.

General information
- Type: Airborne strategic command and control post
- Manufacturer: Lockheed Martin
- Status: In development
- Primary user: United States Navy

History
- Introduction date: Late 2020s (planned)
- Developed from: Lockheed Martin C-130J Super Hercules

The Lockheed Martin E-130J Phoenix II is a planned airborne command post and communication relay aircraft based on the C-130J-30.

The E-130J is intended to replace the Boeing E-6 Mercury in the TACAMO role for the US Navy, but not the associated "Looking Glass" role for the US Air Force. The replacement of the E-6B fleet is to begin in fiscal year 2028.

== Development ==
In the 1990s, the US Navy and US Air Force consolidated their respective airborne command post and communication relay requirements into a single aircraft program operated by the Navy. In 1989, the Boeing 707-based E-6 Mercury replaced the EC-130Q in the "Take Charge and Move Out" (TACAMO) role. As the EC-135 was retired, the E-6B Mercury replaced it in the "Looking Glass" role, while the E-4 replaced it in the Airborne Command Post (ABNCP) role.

The Boeing 707 production line closed following the delivery of the last E-6 Mercury and consequently spare parts for the platform are scarce, and operations have become increasingly expensive. The E-6 Mercury fleet was modernized to the E-6B standard in 1998, but will reach the end of their expected service lives in the 2030s.

By 2015, both the Air Force and Navy realized that they had to look ahead to new platforms to manage their nuclear arsenals in combat. Initially, the two services sought a common replacement aircraft for the E-4, E-6, and C-32A aircraft under the moniker NEAT, combining National Airborne Operations Center (NAOC), Executive Airlift, Airborne Command Post (ABNCP), Take Charge and Move Out (TACAMO).

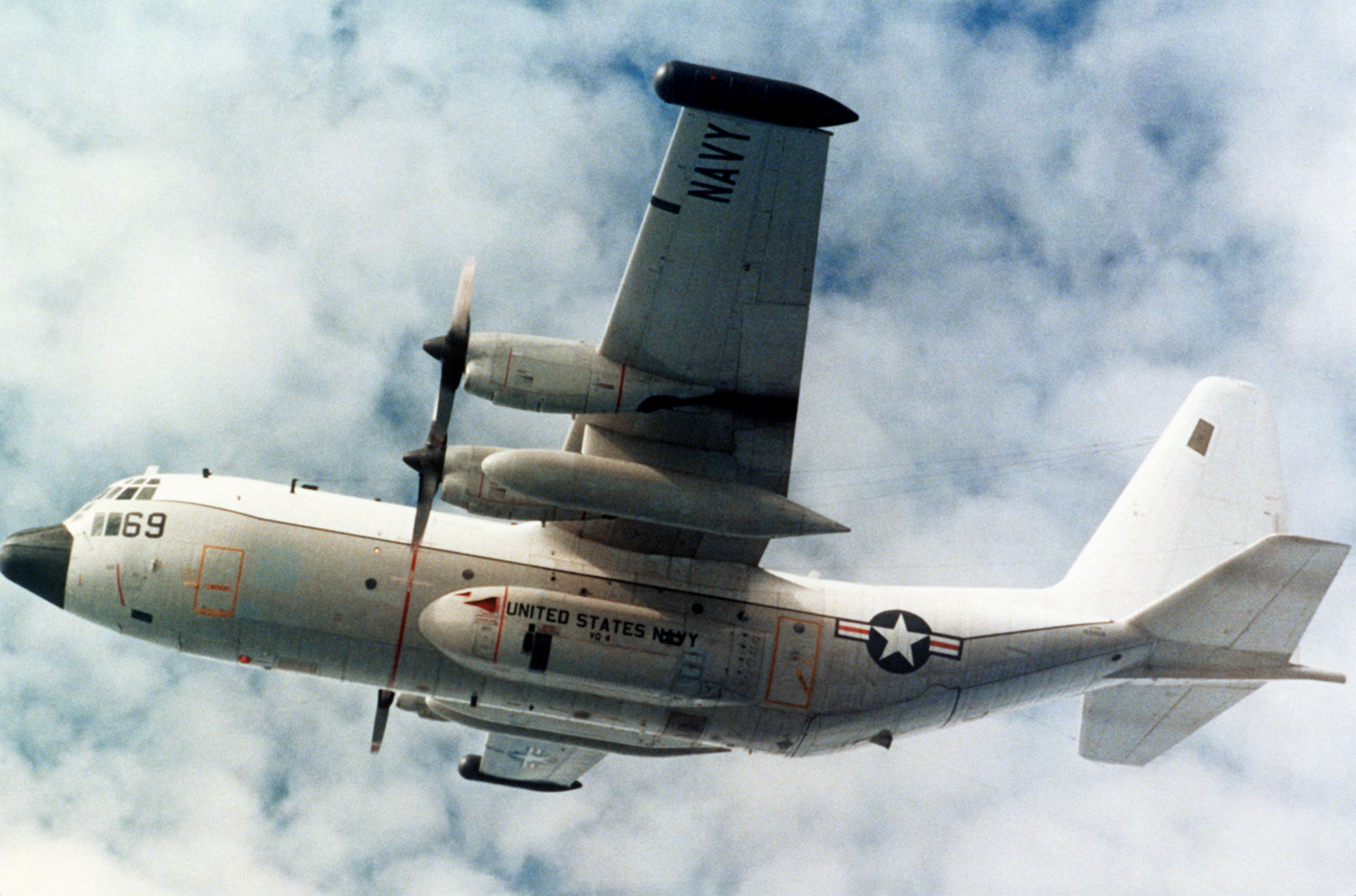
EC-130Q TACAMO aircraft

As the program progressed, the Navy's TACAMO requirements and the Air Force's ABNCP requirements diverged. In December 2020, the US Navy awarded a contract to Lockheed Martin for the purchase of the C-130J-30 Hercules as a testbed for the TACAMO mission. The aircraft selection represents a return to the C-130 platform by the Navy, which used the EC-130Q (an older variant despite the higher letter) for the TACAMO mission from 1963 until 1993.

The selection of the C-130 platform, which is much smaller than the E-6, was surprising to some who expected something based on the larger P-8 Poseidon (based on the Boeing 737) or the much larger KC-46 Pegasus (based on the Boeing 767).

The Navy determined that the elimination of the ABNCP and "Looking Glass" requirements reduces the crew size and endurance requirements, allowing for a much smaller aircraft. Additionally, using a C-130-based platform ensures training and supply chain commonality with other US military C-130 programs. The C-130-based platform can deploy to a much wider range of bases around the world than a larger jet-based platform. With the C-130's reduced runway requirements compared to any of the above jets and design features that emphasize austere and even rough-field capabilities, the E-130J's operations would become less predictable to adversaries.

Three pre-production aircraft were purchased in FY2023: one to be used for air vehicle testing, the other two for mission systems testing. In October 2024, the Navy re-designated the E-XX as the E-130J. The Navy envisions purchases of three production aircraft in FY2027 and another six in FY2028.

=== Funding ===
Since the FY2022 NDAA, Congress has appropriated over $400 million in development funds, including $48.6 million for the first contracts in 2022 and $502 million in 2023. The Navy requested substantially less funding in FY2024, asking for $213.7 million. As of the FY2024 funding request, the program is expected to cost $3.125 billion over the period from FY2022 to FY2028.

== Design ==
The Navy described the mission of E-130J in their FY2024 budget request:

The TACAMO mission provides an airborne capability for survivable, endurable and reliable airborne command, control and communications between the United States (U.S.) National Command Authority (NCA) and the U.S. strategic forces. This mission is critical in the deterrence and management of a nuclear conflict. A dedicated communications platform, TACAMO aircraft feature the ability to communicate on virtually every radio frequency band from very low frequency (VLF) up through advanced extremely high frequency (AEHF) using a variety of modulations, encryptions and networks, minimizing the likelihood an emergency message being jammed by an enemy.

The specific model selected, the E-130J, is 15 ft (4.6 m) longer than the base model, providing more space for crew and equipment. Lockheed has presented an artist's conception of the aircraft that shows enlarged and extended landing gear fairings, multiple domes extending from the fuselage, and two wire antennas capable of extending from the rear of the aircraft.

Known planned capabilities include nuclear electromagnetic pulse (EMP) hardening and cybersecurity hardening, and an upgrade of the trailing wire communications system fielded on the E-6. This system extends a 5 mi (8.0 km) long wire from the tail of the aircraft to enable VLF communications with submerged submarines.

A notable mission change in the transition from the E-6 Mercury to the E-130J is the deletion of the capability to act as the Air Force Airborne Command Post (ABNCP), with the capability to communicate with nuclear bomber fleets and ICBM silos. At one time, the Boeing EC-135C Looking Glass fulfilled the ABNCP mission, but when it was retired by the Air Force in 1998, the E-6 took over. With the Air Force expecting to handle those duties using the planned Survivable Airborne Operations Center aircraft, that capability will no longer be needed aboard the Navy's TACAMO platform.

== See also ==
Related development

- Lockheed EC-130 – 1975 electronic warfare aircraft series by Lockheed

Aircraft of comparable role, configuration, and era

- Boeing E-4 – US Air Force airborne command squadron aircraft
- Boeing E-6 Mercury – Airborne command post aircraft by Boeing based on 707 airframe
- Doomsday plane (Russia) – Russian Airborne Command Post
- Ilyushin Il-80 – Russian airborne command post aircraft based on Il-86 airliner
- Northrop Grumman E-10 MC2A – Proposed Airborne Warning and Control aircraft based on the Boeing 767 airframe
- Survivable Airborne Operations Center – Planned US Air Force airborne nuclear command, control, and communications aircraft
