= Douglas B-23 Dragon =

American medium bomber aircraft

B-23 Dragon / UC-67
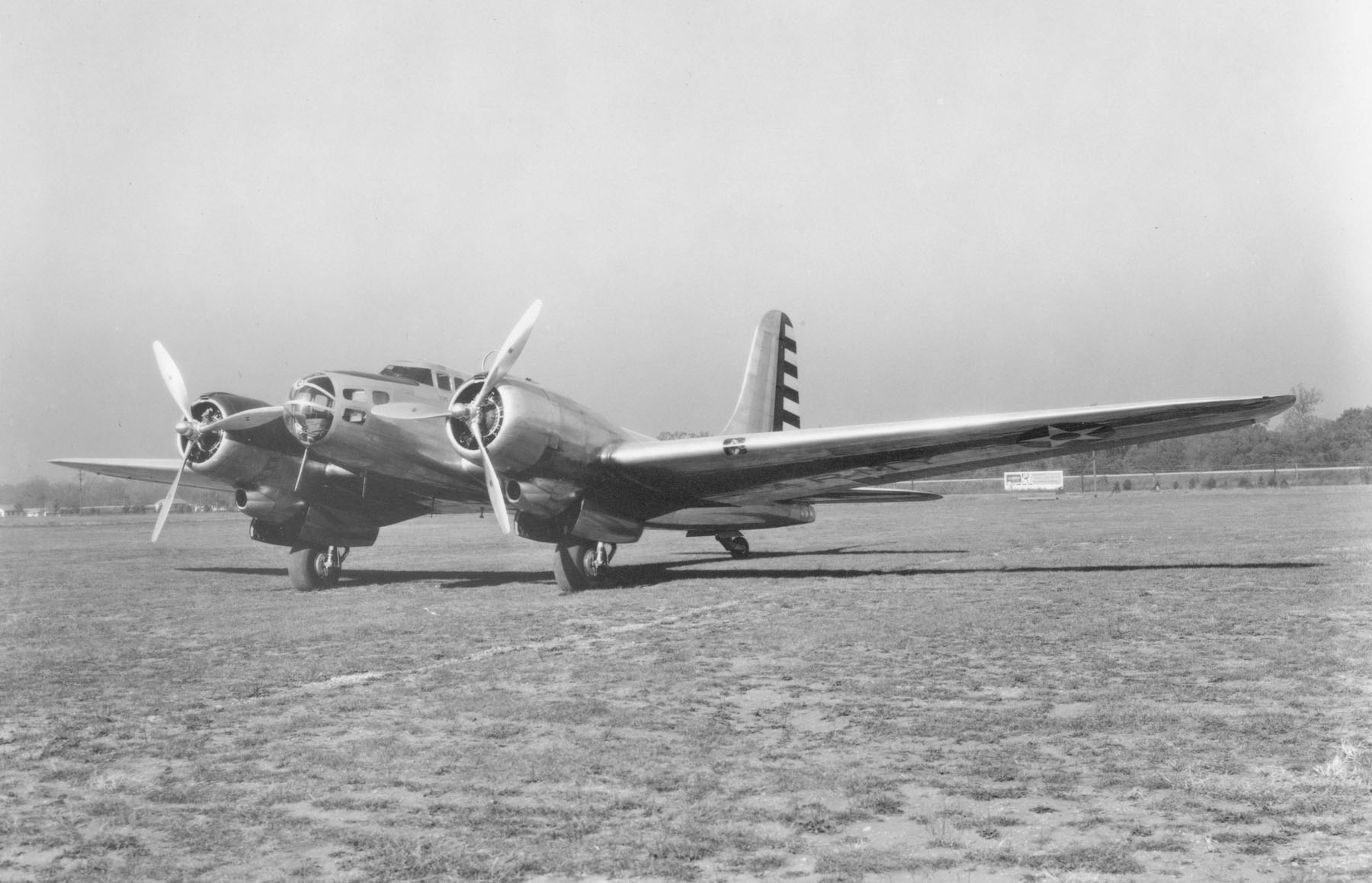
- A B-23 Dragon in USAAC markings during the early 1940s

General information
- Type: Medium bomber
- National origin: United States
- Manufacturer: Douglas Aircraft Company
- Primary user: United States Army Air Corps
- Number built: 38

History
- First flight: 27 July 1939
- Retired: 1945
- Developed from: Douglas B-18 Bolo

The Douglas B-23 Dragon is an American twin-engined bomber developed by the Douglas Aircraft Company as a successor to the B-18 Bolo.

== Design and development ==
Douglas proposed a number of modifications designed to improve the performance of the B-18. Initially considered a redesign, the XB-22 featured 1,600 hp Wright R-2600-1 Twin Cyclone radial engines. The complete B-18 redesign was considered promising enough by the USAAC to alter the original contract to produce the last 38 B-18As ordered under Contract AC9977 as the B-23. The design incorporated a larger wingspan with a wing design very similar to that of the DC-3, a fully retractable undercarriage, and improved defensive armament. The B-23 was the first operational American bomber equipped with a glazed tail gun position. The tail gun was a .50 caliber (12.7 mm) machine gun, which was fired from the prone position by a gunner using a telescopic sight.

The first B-23 flew on July 27, 1939 with the production series of 38 B-23s manufactured between July 1939 and September 1940.

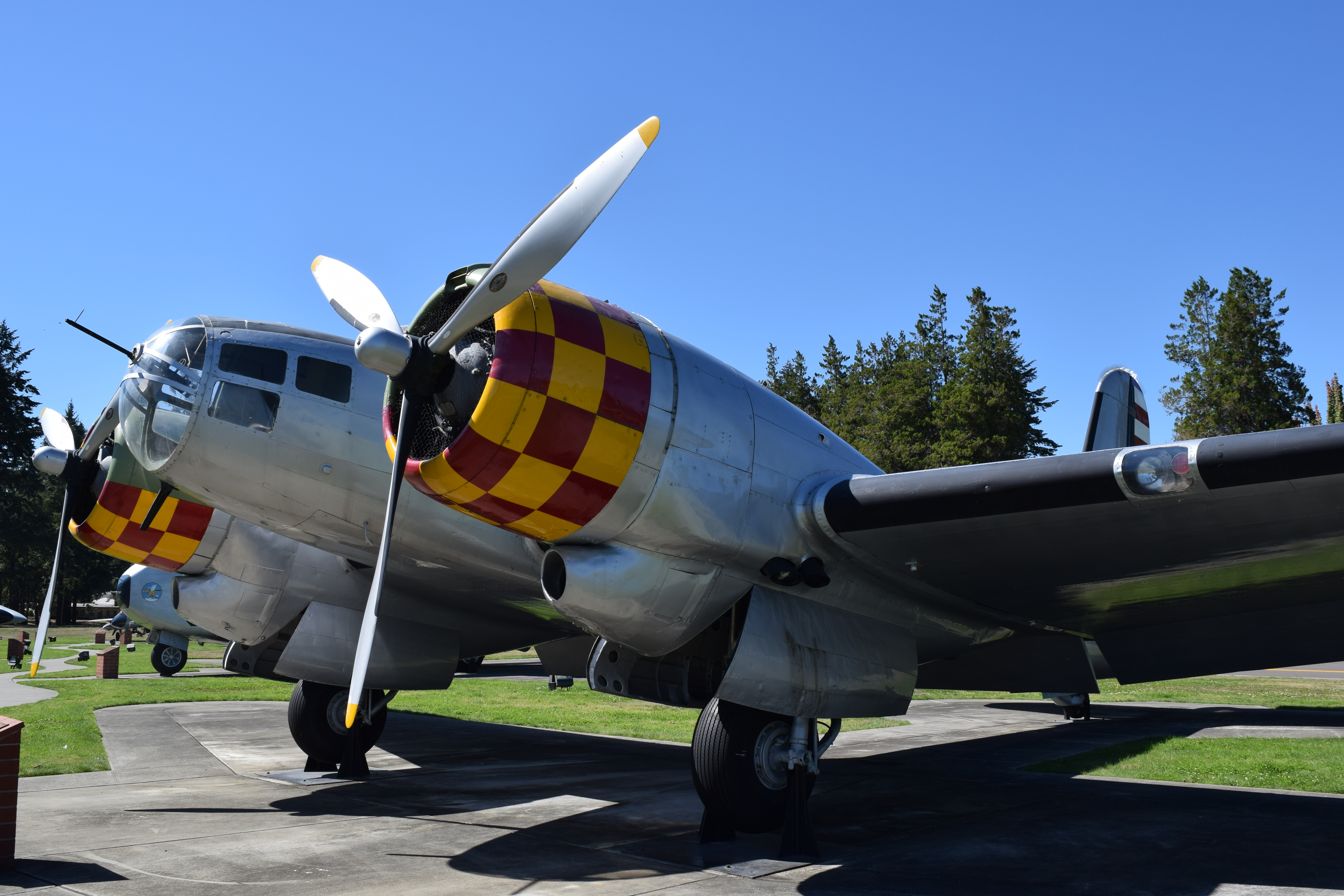
B-23 Dragon front

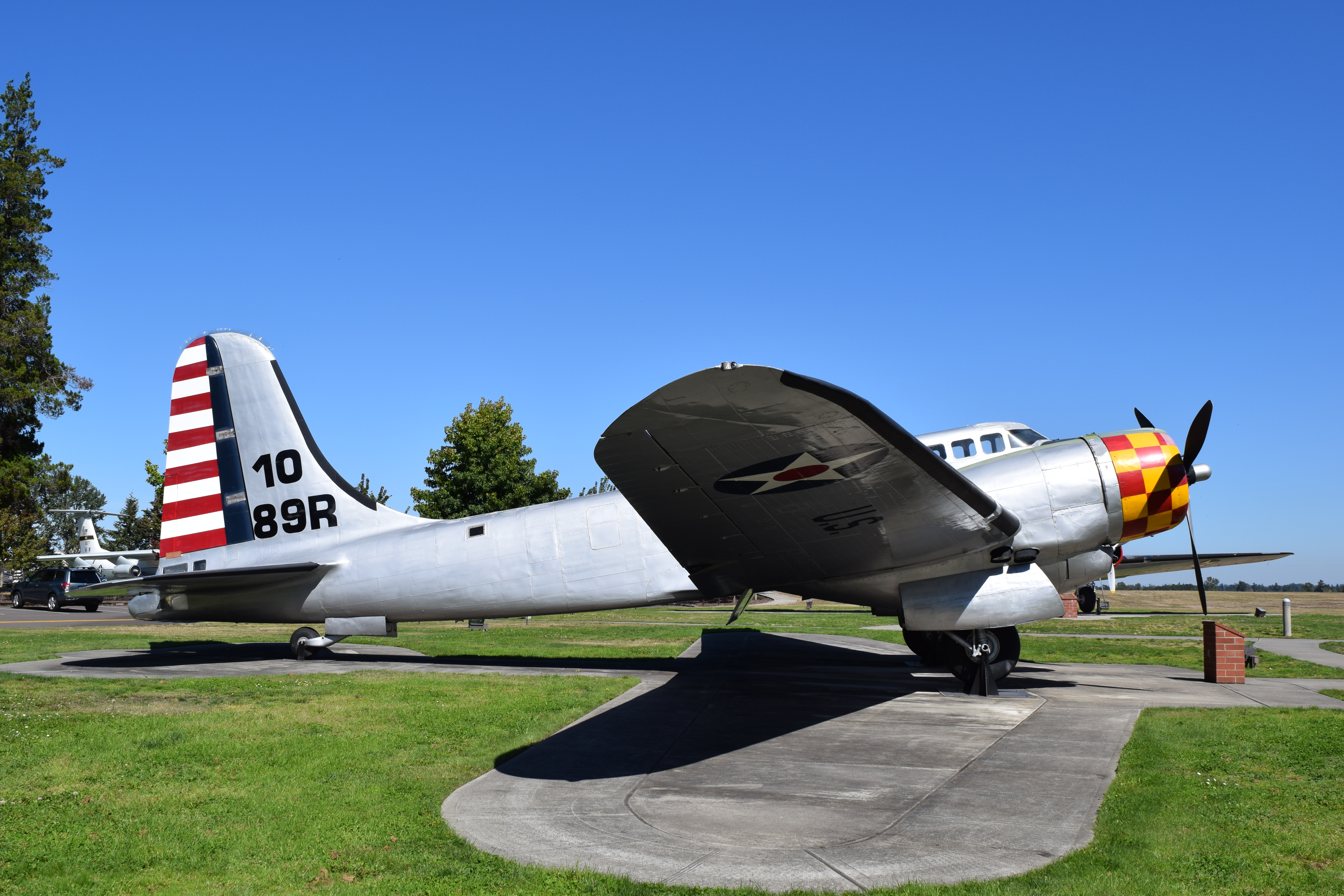
B-23 Dragon side

== Operational history ==
While significantly faster and better armed than the B-18, the B-23 was not comparable to newer medium bombers like the North American B-25 Mitchell and Martin B-26 Marauder. For this reason, the 38 B-23s built were never used in combat overseas, although for a brief period they were employed as patrol aircraft stationed on the west coast of the United States. The B-23s were primarily relegated to training duties, although 18 of them were later converted as transports and redesignated UC-67.

The B-23 also served as a testbed for new engines and systems. For example, one was used for turbosupercharger development by General Electric at Schenectady, New York. Another was used for testing cabin pressurization.

After World War II, many examples were used as executive transports, with appropriate internal modifications, and as a result a large number have survived, both in public and private collections. Howard Hughes (among others) used converted B-23s as personal aircraft.

== Variants ==
B-23
Twin-engined bomber version of the B-18 with modified fuselage, 38 built.
C-67
Conversion to utility transport with provision for glider towing, 12 conversions from B-23, redesignated UC-67 in 1943.
UC-67
C-67 redesignated in 1943.

== Operators ==
United States

- United States Army Air Corps

== Accidents and incidents ==
- On 29 January 1943, a B-23 crash landed on Loon Lake near McCall, Idaho after getting lost in a snowstorm. After waiting at the crash site for five days, three of the crew hiked out to search for help. The five survivors that remained at the crash site were spotted by a passing airplane and rescued eleven days later. The three who hiked out reached a ranger station where they were able to call for help and were recovered on February 17th.

== Surviving aircraft ==
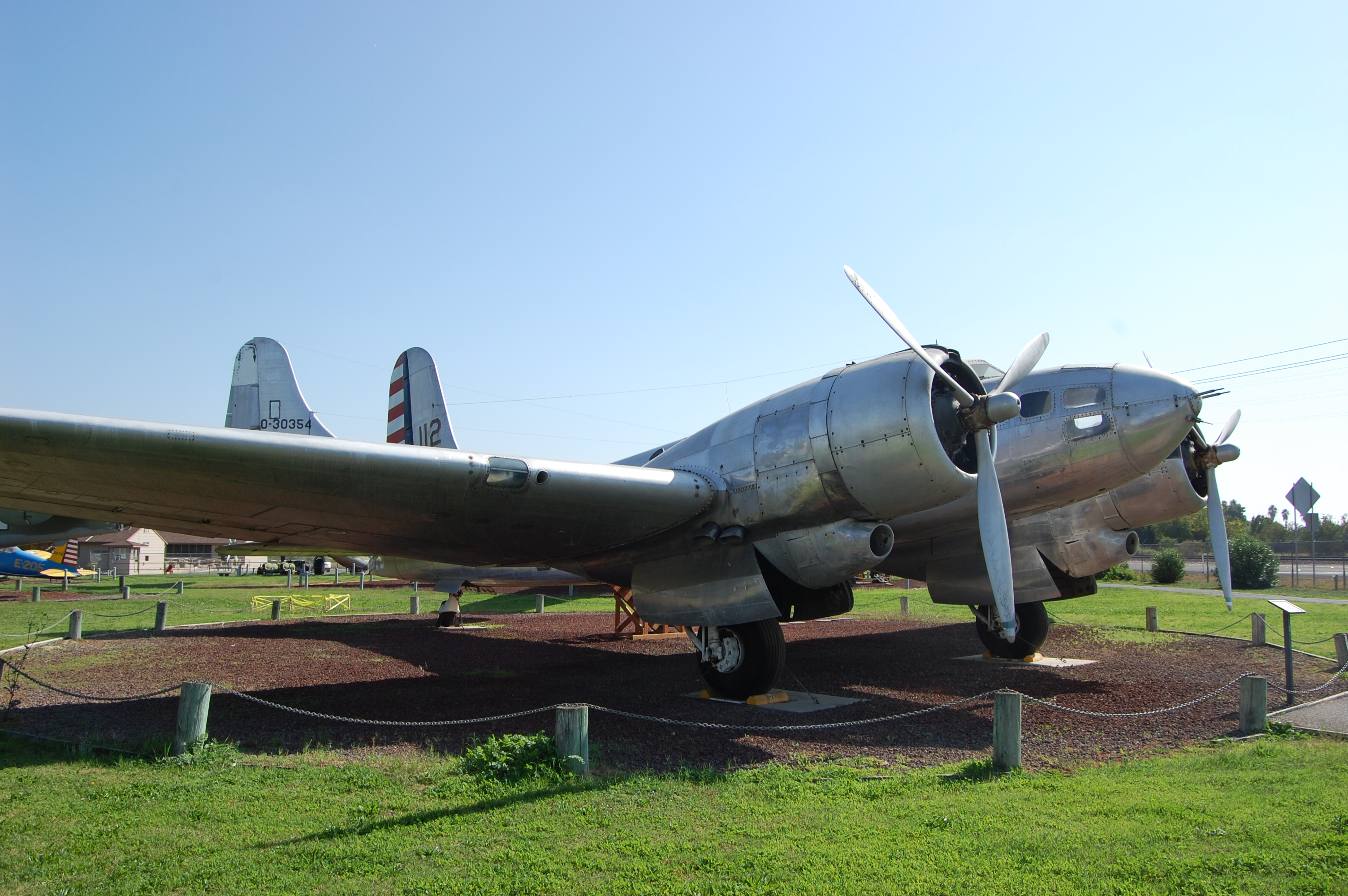
Douglas B-23 Dragon at Castle Air Museum

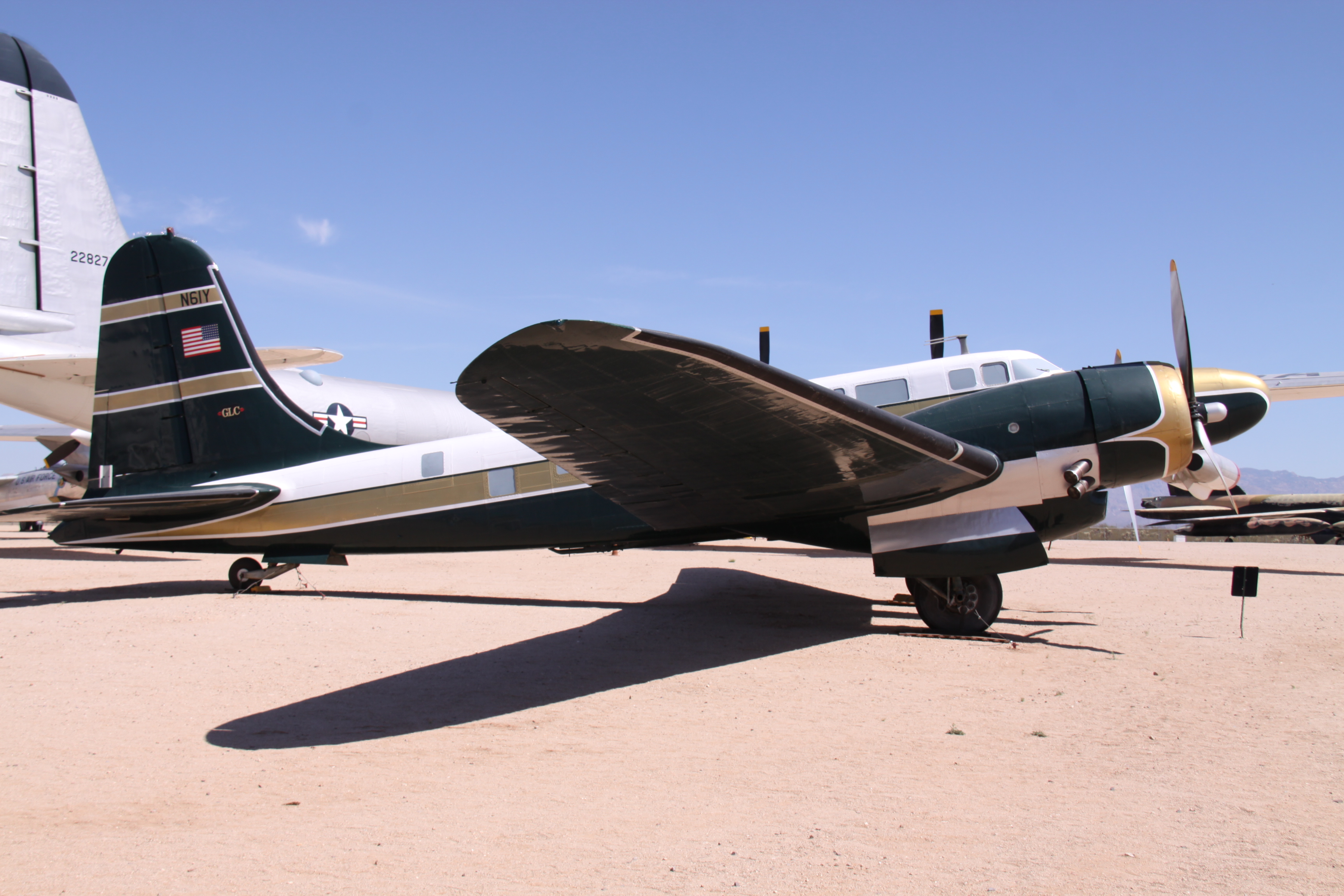
Douglas B-23 Dragon at Pima Air & Space Museum

=== Ecuador ===
- 39-031 – UC-67 on static display at the Aeronautical and Space Museum of the Ecuadorian Air Force in Quito.

=== United States ===
- 39-0033 – B-23 airworthy with ATW Aviation in Marana, Arizona. Registered as N747M.
- 39-0036 – B-23 on static display at the McChord Air Museum at McChord Field near Lakewood, Washington.
- 39-0037 – B-23 in storage at the National Museum of the United States Air Force at Wright-Patterson AFB in Dayton, Ohio.
- 39-0038 – B-23 in storage at the National Warplane Museum in Geneseo, New York.
- 39-0047 – UC-67 on static display at the Castle Air Museum in Atwater, California.
- 39-0051 – B-23 on static display at the Pima Air & Space Museum in Tucson, Arizona.
- 39-0057 – B-23 in storage at Fantasy of Flight in Polk City, Florida.
- 39-0063 – B-23 under restoration with the Liberty Foundation in Moses Lake, Washington.

== Specifications (B-23 Dragon) ==
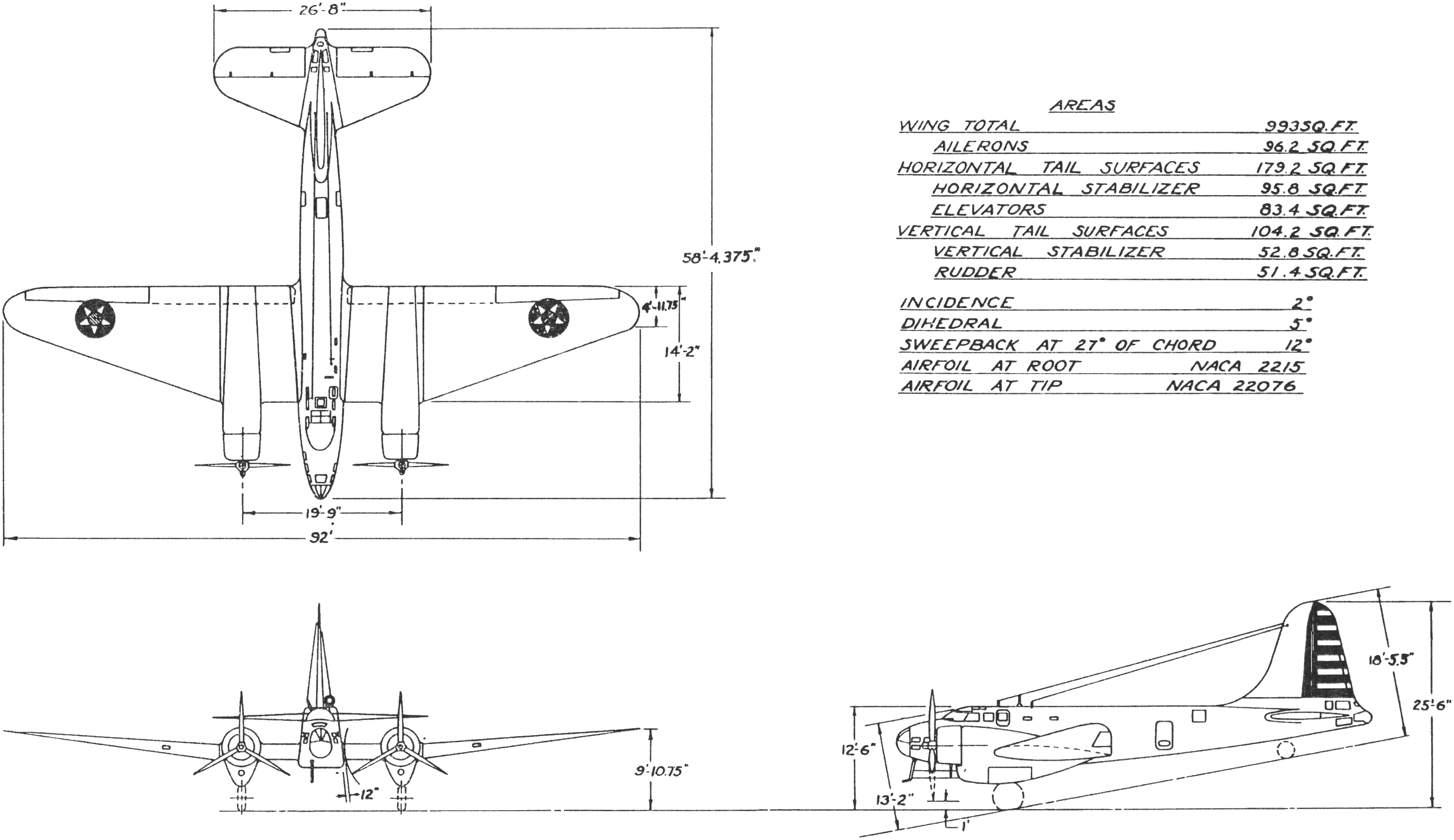
3-view line drawing of the Douglas B-23 Dragon

Data from McDonnell Douglas Aircraft since 1920

General characteristics

- Crew: Six
- Length: 58 ft 4 3/4 in (17.80 m)
- Wingspan: 92 ft 0 in (28.04 m)
- Height: 18 ft 5 1/2 in (5.63 m)
- Wing area: 993 sq ft (92.3 m^{2})
- Empty weight: 19,089 lb (8,659 kg)
- Gross weight: 26,500 lb (12,020 kg)
- Max takeoff weight: 32,400 lb (14,696 kg)
- Powerplant: 2 × Wright R-2600-3 radial engine, 1,600 hp (1,200 kW) each

Performance

- Maximum speed: 282 mph (454 km/h, 245 kn) at 12,000 ft (3,660 m)
- Cruise speed: 210 mph (340 km/h, 180 kn)
- Range: 1,400 mi (2,300 km, 1,200 nmi)
- Service ceiling: 31,600 ft (9,600 m)
- Time to altitude: 6.7 minutes to 10,000 ft (3,050 m)

Armament

- Guns: 3 × .30 in (7.62 mm) machine guns, 1 × .50 in (12.7 mm) machine gun in tail
- Bombs: 2,000 lb (910 kg) in bomb bay

== See also ==
Related development

- Douglas DC-3
- Douglas B-18 Bolo
- Douglas XB-22

Aircraft of comparable role, configuration, and era

- Martin B-26 Marauder
- North American B-25 Mitchell

Related lists

- List of aircraft of World War II
- List of bomber aircraft
- List of military aircraft of the United States
