= Gunderson Do-All Machine =

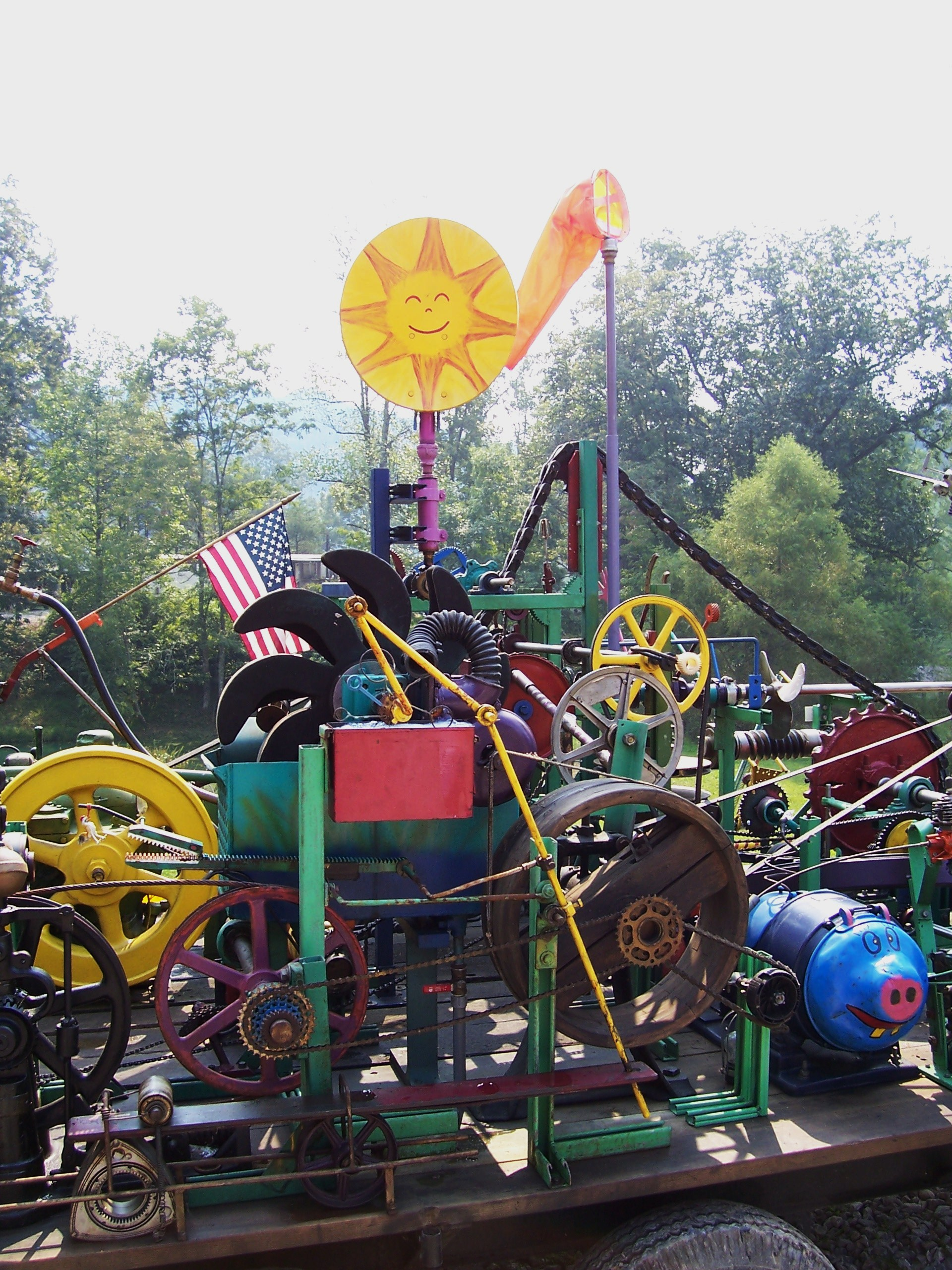
Colorful array of machines on Gunderson Do-All Machine

The Gunderson Do-All Machine is a colorful, interconnected network of dozens of machines that have been cross-sectioned to reveal their internal operating mechanisms. It was designed by Mark Gunderson to illustrate mechanical concepts.

== History and design ==
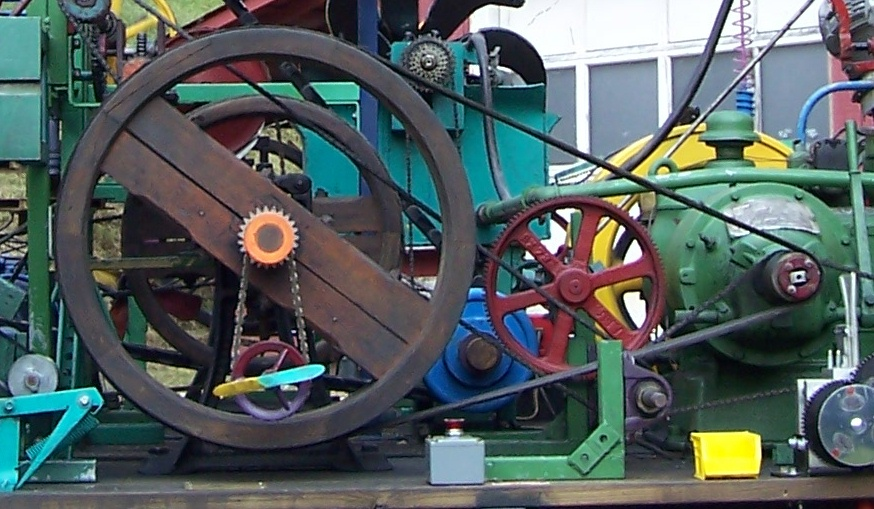
Mainline shaft and pulley from corn grinder

The Gunderson Do-All Machine includes more than 30 individual machines that are linked together by an array of belts, gears, pulleys, and transmissions. Collectively, they operate in a continuous chain reaction on the power of one 10-horsepower (7.5 kW) Whitte gas oil well engine, forming a kinetic sculpture. The entire network is mounted on a 15-foot (4.6 m) flat bed trailer platform, so that it can be transported to engine shows, educational venues, and county fairs. The combined weight of the trailer and all components is about 6000 pounds.

The Do-All's layout and design allows one to follow the chain reaction from machine to machine while observing the internal cogs, gears, and other components that make them work. The variety of machines include an automatically reversing worm gear, a water pump impeller, a governor/gas valve from a 20-horsepower (HP) JC engine, a blacksmith blower/bubble maker, the main line shaft and pulley from an antique corn grinder, a floating gear, a DC 110-volt generator and lights, a 38-to-1 gear reducer, a bicycle light generator, and a fan blower painted to look like a clown. Recent additions include a penny press that creates a commemorative Do-All Machine coin and a rotating satellite dish with sun and moon images painted on opposite sides.

== Major engine components ==
The Gunderson Do-All includes the following major engines that have been cut away to reveal their inner workings in action:

- Wright Twin Cyclone R-2600 1,700 horsepower radial engine from a B-25 Bomber
- Wankel Rotary Engine from a Mazda RX-7
- 301 Cu in Pontiac V8 engine from a TransAm
- Jeep CJ5 Transmission

== Gallery ==
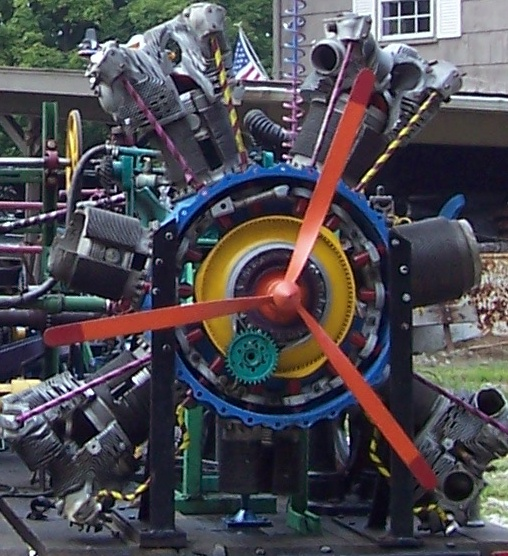
Cross-section of Wright Twin Cyclone engine from B-25 Bomber

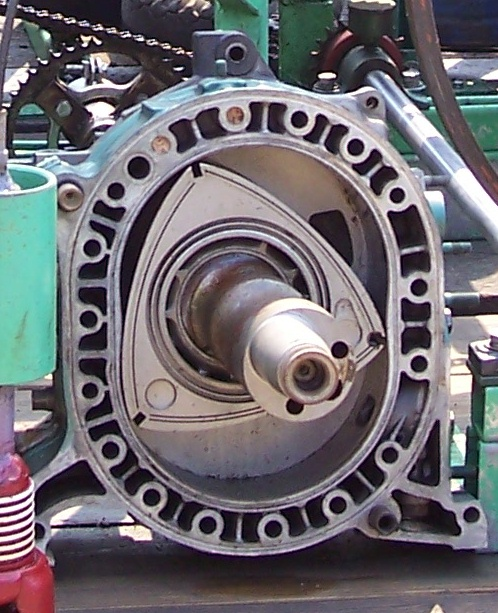
Cut-away view of triangular Wankel Rotary engine from Mazda RX-7 automobile

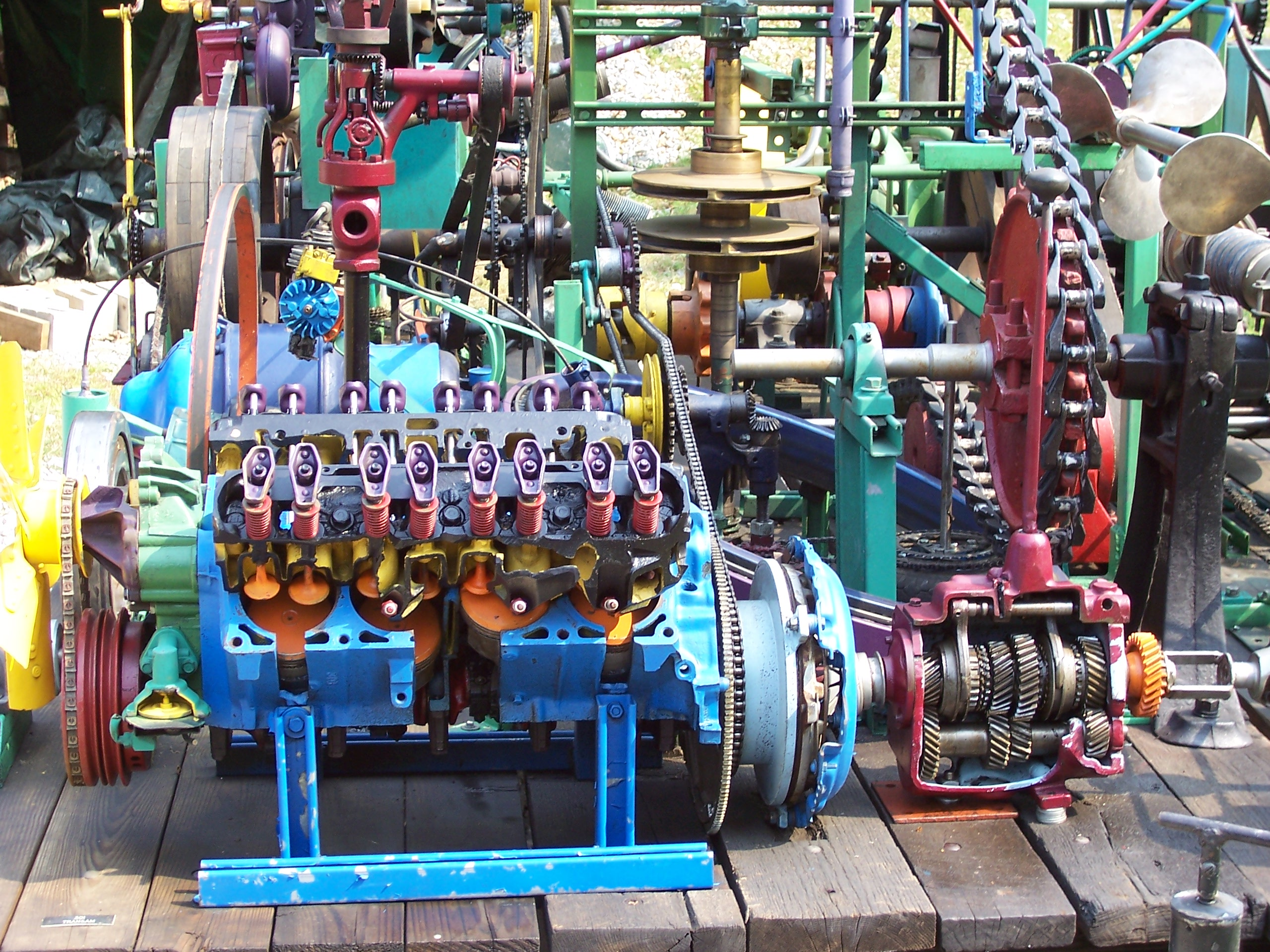
Cut-away top view of Trans Am V-8 engine mounted to the left of a Jeep CJ5 transmission with gearbox open

An animated demonstration of the unique Wankel rotary design in action

== See also ==
- Pontiac TransAm
- Rube Goldberg machine
