= Wright R-2600 Twin Cyclone =

American WWII-era aircraft engine

R-2600
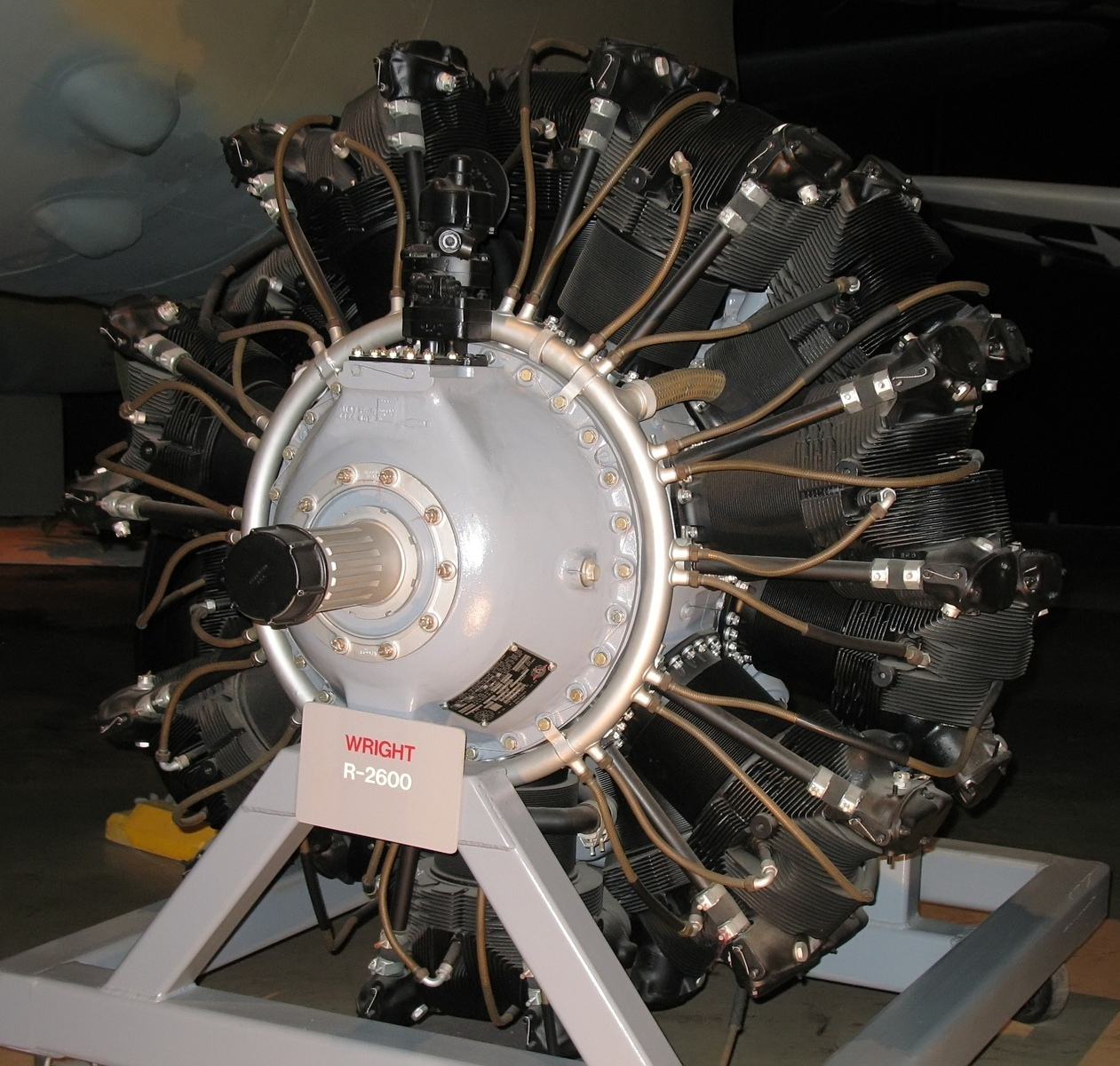
- Wright R-2600 Cyclone radial engine
- Type: Radial engine
- National origin: United States
- Manufacturer: Wright Aeronautical
- First run: 1935
- Major applications: Curtiss SB2C Helldiver; Douglas A-20 Havoc; Grumman TBF Avenger; Martin PBM Mariner; North American B-25 Mitchell; Vultee Vengeance
- Manufactured: February 1937–January 1946
- Number built: 85,374
- Developed from: Wright R-1820 Cyclone

The Wright R-2600 Cyclone 14 (also called Twin Cyclone) is an American radial engine developed by Curtiss-Wright, and widely used in aircraft in the 1930s and 1940s.

== History ==
In 1935, Curtiss-Wright began work on a more powerful version of their successful R-1820 Cyclone 9. The result was the R-2600 Twin Cyclone, with 14 cylinders arranged in two rows. The 1,600 hp (1,200 kW; 1,600 PS) R-2600-3 was originally intended for the C-46 Commando (being fitted to the prototype CW-20A). It was also the original engine choice for the F6F Hellcat; a running change (one which would not stop production) for the CW-20A, and one in late April 1942 for the second XF6F-1, led to the adoption of the 2,000 hp (1,500 kW; 2,000 PS) Pratt & Whitney R-2800 Double Wasp in the R-2600's place for both designs.

The Twin Cyclone went on to power several important American World War II aircraft, including the A-20 Havoc, B-25 Mitchell, TBF Avenger, SB2C Helldiver, and the PBM Mariner.

Over 50,000 R-2600s were built at plants in Paterson, New Jersey, and Cincinnati, Ohio.

== Variants ==
The following is a list of known R-2600 models. Engines would receive a three-part designation from Curtiss-Wright. For example, "R-2600-1;" the "R" indicating a "radial engine," "2600" indicating an engine displacement of 2,600 cu in (43 L), and "1" indicating the internal model number, usually assigned chronologically. Engines accepted by the U.S. government were assigned a separate, three-part governmental designation. For example, the "R-2600-13" was accepted into service as the "GR-2600-B655;" the "GR" indicating a "(geared) radial engine," the "2600" indicating an engine displacement of 2,600 cu in (43 L), and "B655" indicating the governmental model number. The Curtiss-Wright designation is usually utilized more often than the governmental designation, and the U.S. government utilized both designations interchangeably and often together.

The Curtiss-Wright designation will be listed first, followed by the — when known — governmental designation in parentheses (the lack of a governmental designation does not indicate that the model was not accepted into governmental service). Engines known only by their governmental designation will be listed at the bottom.

R-2600-1
1,600 hp (1,194 kW)
R-2600-2
1,500 hp (1,118 kW); Prototype variant; Few were made.
R-2600-3
1,600 hp (1,194 kW)
R-2600-4
1,650 hp (1,230 kW)
R-2600-5 (GR-2600-A79)
1,600 hp (1,194 kW); Few made, possibly three or less. Utilized a three-speed supercharger.
R-2600-6
1,600 hp (1,194 kW)
R-2600-7
1,700 hp (1,268 kW); Provisioned for a turbo-supercharger. Unknown use and unknown quantity produced.
R-2600-8
1,700 hp (1,268 kW); Utilized, among other uses, by the National Advisory Committee for Aeronautics (NACA) to test water injection generally and in-regards to the R-2600 series, specifically. Without water injection, the R-2600-8 was capable of producing 1,700 hp (1,268 kW) at 2400 rpm for limited periods at take-off power. With water injection, testing was able to achieve 1,943 hp (1,449 kW) (maintaining the standard 2400 rpm), a 14.3% increase in power, with a fuel efficiency increase of 5%. By increasing to 2600 rpm, testing was able to achieve 2,060 hp (1,536 kW), a 21% increase in power, while providing a 4% boost in fuel efficiency. Water injection would feature heavily in mid- to late-WWII U.S. engines, including some early jet engines
R-2600-8A
1,700 hp (1,268 kW); Powered the Brewster SB2A-4 Buccaneer, 162 SB2As built for the Kingdom of the Netherlands for service in the Dutch East Indies by the Royal Netherlands East Indies Army Air Force. The Dutch East Indies were overrun by Imperial Japan in early 1942 before a single Buccaneer was delivered. The Dutch SB2As were requisitioned by the U.S. Navy (USN). The USN provided them to the U.S. Marine Corps (USMC), complete with Dutch markings. The USN and USMC would designate these 162 models as the SB2A-4. The USMC utilized these models to establish their first night fighter squadron, VMF(N)-531
R-2600-9
1,700 hp (1,268 kW); Powered the initial production run of the B-25 Mitchell, the B-25 (24 built), B-25A (40 built), and the B-25B (designated the "Mitchell Mk.I" by the Royal Air Force; 23 built). The B-25C (1,625 built) would see the -9 replaced with the R-2600-13
R-2600-10 (GR-2600-B676)
1,700 hp (1,268 kW); Experimental high-altitude R-2600 variant with an "advanced" two-stage mechanical supercharger, vice the usual single-stage supercharger. The 2600-10 also served as a testbed for turbo-supercharging the 2600 series (which would come to fruition with the R-2600-16). Very few were produced. The R-2600-10 powered Grumman's prototype F6F Hellcat, the XF6F-1. The XF6F-2 would be powered by the developmentally similar R-2600-16. Grumman and the U.S. Navy were not happy with the R-2600's performance, which led to the 2,000 hp (1,491 kW) Pratt & Whitney R-2800 engine replacing the R-2600 on the XF6F-3 and F6F production models.
XR-2600-10
1,900 hp (1,420 kW); Experimental version of the R-2600-10 uprated to 1,900 hp (1,420 kW), a 12% increase over the 1,700 hp (1,268 kW) R-2600-10. The XR-2600-10 powered two examples of the Grumman TBF Avenger, the XTBF-2 (1 built) and the TBM-2 (1 built). Neither the XTBF-2, TBM-2, nor the XR-2600-10 would enter serial production
R-2600-11
1,600 hp (1,194 kW);
R-2600-12 (GR-2800-B766)
1,700 hp (1,268 kW)
R-2600-13 (GR-2600-B655)
1,700 hp (1,268 kW); Powered the Brewster SB2A-4; Curtiss P-37; Douglas A-24A/B/C; Martin A-30A/B; North American XB-25E/F/G, B-25C/D/G/H/J, CB-25J, TB-25J, and F-10; Lockheed O-56/RB-34B/B-37/RB-37; Short Brothers Stirling; and the Vultee A-35A & A-35B. The -13 would also power a maritime patrol-bomber variant of the B-25, the PBJ-1D. 13,494 R-2600-13s were built between April 1941 and January 1944
R-2600-14
1,700 hp (1,268 kW); Powered at least one of the prototypes of the Grumman F7F Tigercat (a twin-engined heavy fighter-interceptor), the XF7F-1. The R-2600-14 was a development of the R-2600-10 and featured "advanced supercharging" for high-altitude performance. The R-2600-14 was developed specifically for the Tigercat project. The engines were replaced in initial production versions by the 2,100 hp (1,566 kW) R-2800-22, ultimately trading superior high-altitude performance for the R-2800-22's significantly improved low- and medium-altitude performance.
R-2600-15
1,800 hp (1,342 kW); Planned to power the XB-33A, a prototype model of the B-33 Super Marauder (itself a high-altitude version of the Martin B-26 Marauder). The project was cancelled, and neither the prototype XB-33A or production B-33A were ever built.
R-2600-16
1,700 hp (1,268 kW); Similar to the R-2600-10 & -14, the -16 was tuned for high-altitude performance; The -16 was designed to be mounted alongside a turbo-supercharger system. The -16 would power the second Grumman F6F, the initial XF6F-2. The XF6F-1 and XF6F-2 was found to be lacking in performance; The XF6F-2 designation was re-used on a third prototype, an R-2800-powered XF6F-2. The R-2800 would carry-over into the final prototype, the XF6F-3, as well as production models.
R-2600-17
1,700 hp (1,268 kW); May have powered a Vultee A-31 Vengeance (or A-35) variant. May have also powered one of the C-55 prototypes, a derivative of the C-46 Commando
R-2600-17A
1,750 hp (1,305 kW); Uprated R-2600-17
R-2600-19 (GR-2600-A5B)
1,600 hp (1,194 kW), 1,660 hp (1,237 kW)
R-2600-20
1,700 hp (1,268 kW), 1,900 hp (1,420 kW)
R-2600-21 (GR-2600-A5B)
1,500 hp (1,118 kW), 1,600 hp (1,194 kW), 1,700 hp (1,268 kW); Experimental R-2600-19 engines modified with new carburetors and cylinder baffles. -21s were "converted" back into -19s and retained their governmental GR-2600-A5B designation
R-2600-22
2,100 hp (1,566 kW); Powerplant of the experimental XSB2C-6 Helldiver as well as the PBM-3D Mariner. Power is referenced as low as 1,900 hp (1,418 kW) and as high as 2,100 hp (1,566 kW)
R-2600-23 (GR-2600-A5B-0)
1,600 hp (1,194 kW), 1,675 hp (1,250 kW); The R-2600-23 required 91 octane fuel (other R-2600 models accepted higher-octane fuel). The -23 was normally rated at 1,600 hp (1,194 kW) at sea level while at take-off power, but could be "uprated" to 1,675 hp (1,250 kW). These "uprated" -23s were utilized in the Douglas A-20G Havoc, the most-produced (2,850 built) A-20 model
R-2600-25
1,350 hp (1,007 kW)
R-2600-27
2,000 hp (1,491 kW)
R-2600-28
No known information; Occasionally the 2,100 hp (1,566 kW) R-2600-22 is referred to as the R-2600-28
R-2600-29
1,700 hp (1,268 kW), 1,850 hp (1,380 kW); Likely the most-produced R-2600 variant, with at least 17,848 produced. The R-2600-29 powered the B-25C and -25D (including the PB1-1J, a maritime patrol bomber variant of the B-25) as well as the A-20G and -H. An R-2600-29A is also referenced in various manuals and reports as the powerplant of the twin-engine TB-25N medium bomber trainer aircraft. The R-2600-29A is referenced interchangeably with the R-2600-35.
R-2600-31
1,700 hp (1,268 kW); The Lockheed B-34 Ventura, originally powered by the R-2800, was chosen to be converted into a large, armed reconnaissance and observation aircraft, designated as the "O-56." This was later changed to "RB-34B," then to "B-37," and finally to "RB-37." 500 RB-37s were ordered, but the contract was cancelled after 18 were delivered. As the RB-37 was not expected to carry bomb loads, it was felt a lower-powered engine would suffice; The 2,000 hp (1,491 kW) R-2800 was replaced by either the 1,700 hp (1,268 kW) R-2600-31 or, with early models, the R-2600-13
R-2600-33
1,700 hp (1,268 kW)
R-2600-34
2,100 hp (1,566 kW); Two R-2600-34s served as the powerplants of the early versions of the PBM-5 Mariner, before the switch-over to the R-2800
R-2600-35
1,700 hp (1,268 kW), 1,850 hp (1,380 kW); An R-2600-29 or R-2600-29A modified with a Bendix Stromberg PR48A4 carburetor. The -29, -29A, and -35 may have been considered interchangeable to a degree.
GR-2600-A71
1,350 hp (1,007 kW); May have been a simplified name of the GR-2600-A71-3
GR-2600-A71-3
1,600 hp (1,193 kW); Early R-2600 model, developed in late 1938 or very early 1939. Powered the North American NA-40B, a twin-engine medium bomber of which only one was built. The NA-40 would lead the to B-25 Mitchell. May also be referred to as the GR-2600-A71
GR-2600-C14
1,750 hp (1,304 kW)

== Applications ==
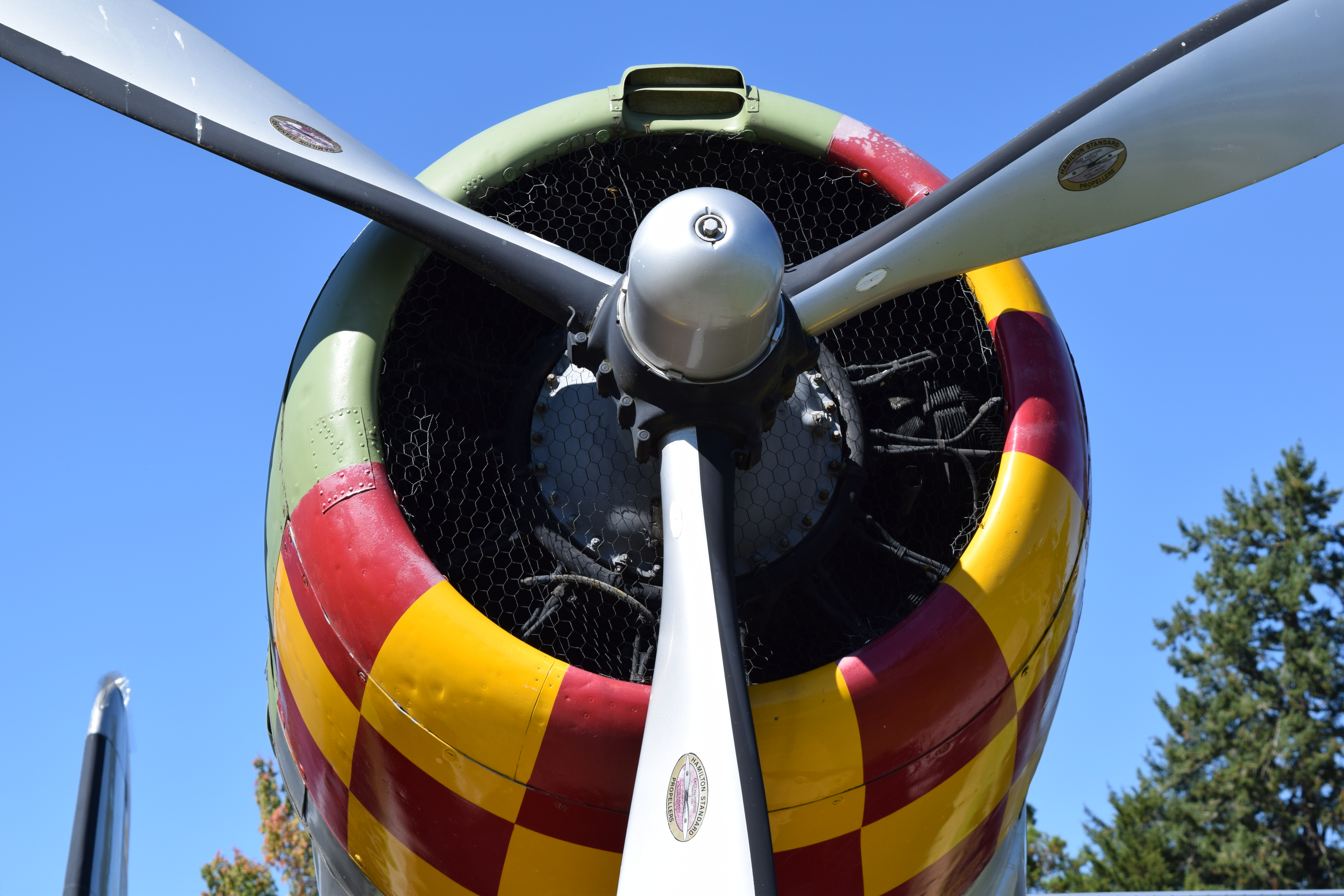
Wright R-2600-3 on a B-23 Dragon

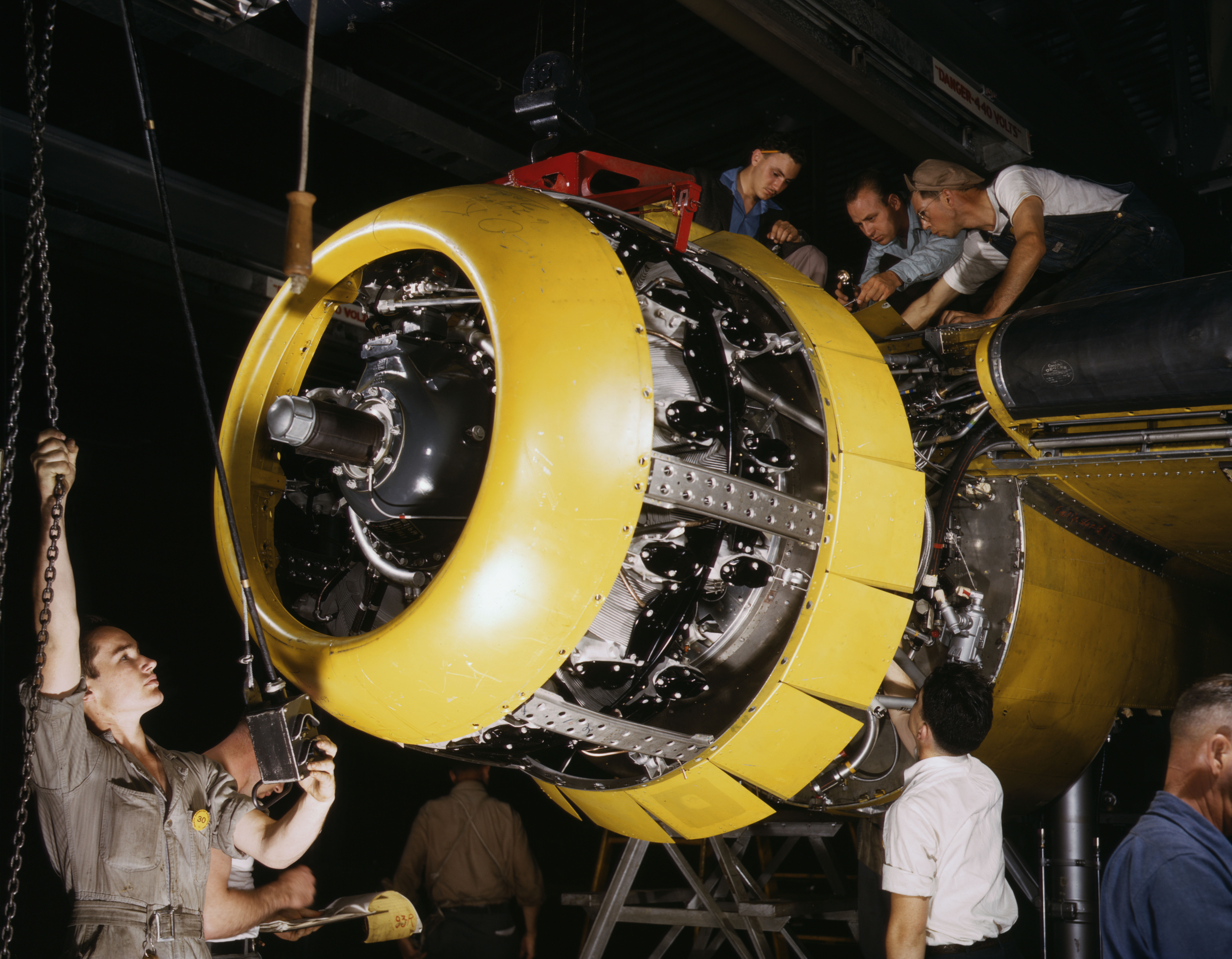
Wright R-2600 Cyclone being fitted to a North American B-25 Mitchell, at North American Aviation, Inglewood, California

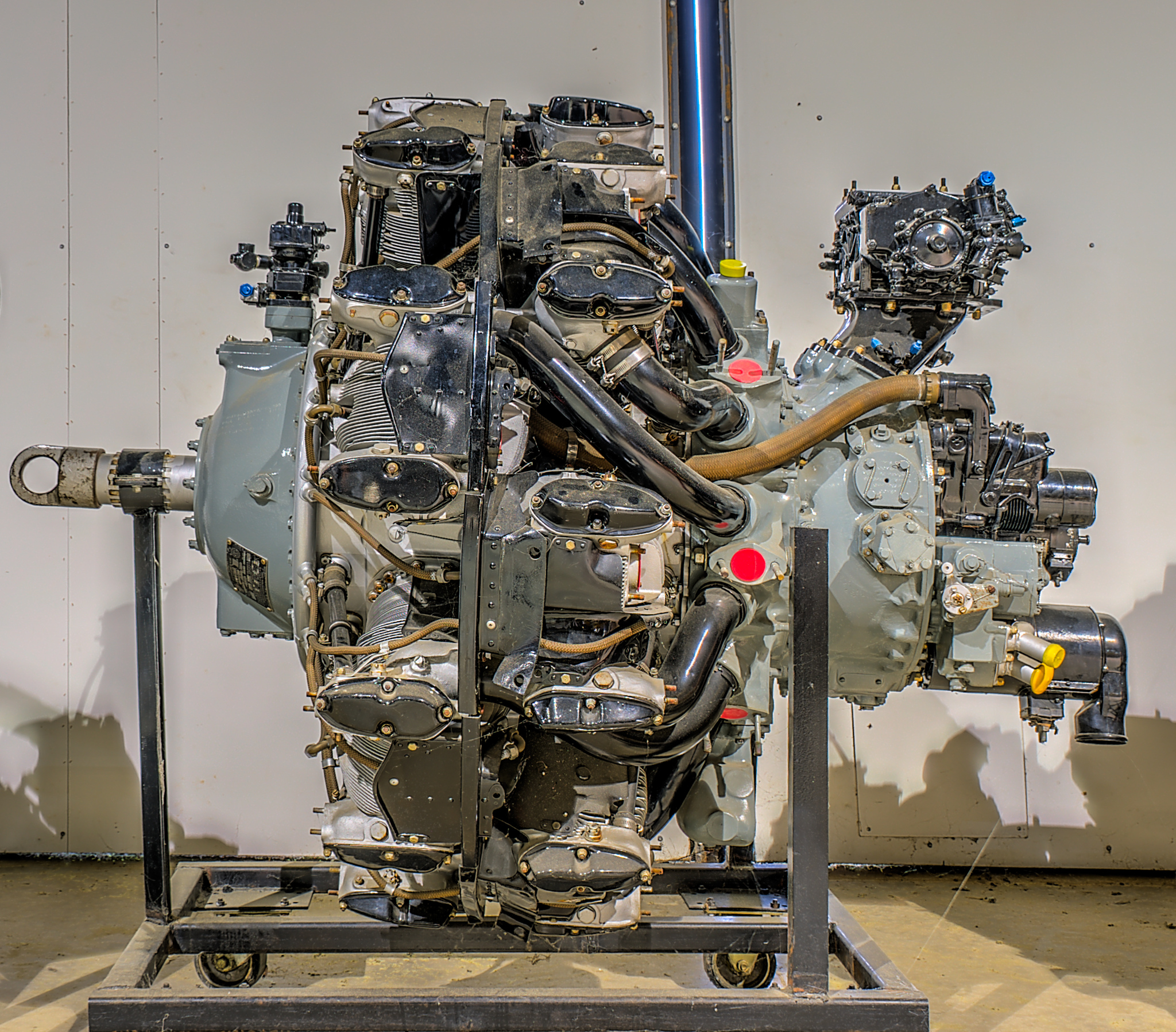
R-2600 on display at Museum of Aviation, Robins AFB

- Boeing 314 Clipper
- Brewster SB2A Buccaneer
- Consolidated PB4Y-2 Privateer ("Super Privateer" conversions)
- Curtiss SB2C Helldiver
- Douglas A-20 Havoc
- Douglas B-23 Dragon
- Grumman F6F Hellcat (XF6F-1 & -2 prototypes only, pre-April 1942)
- Grumman XF7F Tigercat
- Grumman TBF Avenger
- Latécoère 631
- Lioré et Olivier LeO 451
- Lockheed O-56
- Martin Baltimore
- Martin PBM Mariner (versions prior to the R-2800 "Double Wasp"-powered PBM-5, though early models of the PBM-5 mounted the 2,100 hp (1,566 kW) R-2600-34)
- Martin XB-33 Super Marauder
- Miles Monitor
- North American B-25 Mitchell
- Vultee A-31 Vengeance

== Specifications (GR-2600-C14BB) ==
Data from Jane's.

=== General characteristics ===
- Type: 14-cylinder supercharged air-cooled two-row radial engine
- Bore: 6.125 in (155.6 mm)
- Stroke: 6.3125 in (160.3 mm)
- Displacement: 2,604 cu in (42.67 L)
- Length: 62.06 in (1,576 mm)
- Diameter: 55 in (1,397 mm)
- Dry weight: 2,045 lb (928 kg)

=== Components ===
- Valvetrain: Two pushrod-actuated valves per cylinder with sodium-cooled exhaust valve
- Supercharger: Single-stage two-speed centrifugal type supercharger, impeller diameter 11 in (280 mm), blower ratio 7.06:1 at slow speed and 10.06:1 at high speed
- Fuel system: Stromberg PR48A downdraft carburetor with automatic mixture control
- Oil system: Dry sump with one pressure pump and two scavenge pumps
- Cooling system: Air-cooled

=== Performance ===
- Power output:
  - 1,750 hp (1,300 kW) at 2,600 rpm at 3,200 ft (1,000 m) military power
  - 1,450 hp (1,080 kW) at 2,600 rpm at 15,000 ft (4,600 m) military power
- Specific power: 0.67 hp/cu in (30 kW/L)
- Compression ratio: 6.9:1
- Power-to-weight ratio: 0.86 hp/lb (1.41 kW/kg)

== See also ==
- Gunderson Do-All Machine - incorporates an R-2600 into an educational network of machines that is also kinetic art.

Related development

- Wright Cyclone series
- Wright R-1300 Cyclone 7
- Wright R-1820 Cyclone
- Wright R-3350 Duplex-Cyclone
- Hispano-Suiza 14AA

Comparable engines

- BMW 801
- Bristol Hercules
- Fiat A.74
- Gnome-Rhône 14N
- Mitsubishi Kasei
- Pratt & Whitney R-2800
- Shvetsov ASh-82 - derived and metricated from Wright Aeronautical radial engine designs

Related lists

- List of aircraft engines
