= Martin XB-33 Super Marauder =

American bomber project

XB-33 Super Marauder
- Schematic blueprint drawing of the XB-33.

General information
- Type: Medium bomber
- National origin: United States
- Manufacturer: Glenn L. Martin Company
- Status: Cancelled 25 November 1942
- Primary user: United States Army Air Forces (intended)
- Number built: None

History
- Developed from: Martin B-26 Marauder

The Martin XB-33 Super Marauder was a proposed World War II American bomber aircraft. It was designed by the Glenn L. Martin Company as the Martin Model 190 and was a high-altitude derivative of the company's B-26 Marauder. Two different designs were developed, first as a twin-engined aircraft and then as a four-engined aircraft. The four-engined version was ordered by the United States Army Air Forces, but the program was cancelled before any aircraft were built.

== Design and development ==
=== XB-33 ===
The first version of the B-33 design, the XB-33, was a twin-tailed medium bomber with two Wright R-3350 engines and pressurised crew compartments; its design began in 1940. It would carry around 4,000 lb (1,814 kg) of bombs. Soon after design of the XB-33 began it became clear that a twin-engined aircraft would not achieve the performance requested by the army. The company moved on to developing a larger four-engined design, the XB-33A.

=== XB-33A ===
Following the abandonment of the original twin-engined design, the company continued to design a larger four-engined aircraft, and two prototypes were ordered by the USAAF as the XB-33A; its bombload was to have been 12,000 lb (5,443 kg), as much as that of the B-24 Liberator, the heaviest US bomber flown in combat prior to the B-29.

The original XB-33 design was to have been powered by the R-3350, the redesigned XB-33A was to have used Wright R-2600 engines. The main reason for this was the demand for R-3350s for the B-29, one of the most highly valued projects of the Army Air Forces.

On January 17, 1942, the USAAF placed an order for 400 B-33As, to be built at the government-owned plant in Omaha, Nebraska, operated by Martin. On November 25, 1942, the project was cancelled to allow the Omaha plant to concentrate on manufacturing B-29s.

== Variants ==
XB-33
Prototype medium bomber powered by two 1,800 hp (1,343 kW) R-3350 engines, two ordered and cancelled.
XB-33A
Prototype medium bomber powered by four 1,800 hp (1,343 kW) R-2600-15 engines, two ordered and cancelled.
B-33A Super Marauder
Production variant of XB-33A, 400 ordered and cancelled.

== Specifications (B-33A, as designed) ==
General characteristics

- Crew: seven
- Length: 79 ft 10 in (24.3 m)
- Wingspan: 134 ft 0 in (40.8 m)
- Height: 24 ft 0 in (7.32 m)
- Wing area: 1,646 sq ft (153 m^{2})
- Empty weight: 85,000 lb (39,000 kg)
- Gross weight: 95,000 lb (43,000 kg)
- Powerplant: 4 × Wright R-2600-15 radial engines, 1,800 hp (1,300 kW) each

Performance

- Maximum speed: 345 mph (555 km/h, 300 kn)
- Cruise speed: 242 mph (389 km/h, 210 kn)
- Range: 2,000 mi (3,000 km, 1,700 nmi)
- Service ceiling: 39,000 ft (12,000 m)
- Wing loading: 58 lb/sq ft (280 kg/m^{2})
- Power/mass: 0.076 hp/lb (55 W/kg)

Armament

- Guns: 8 × .50 in (12.7 mm) machine guns
- Bombs: 10,000 lb (4,500 kg)

== See also ==
Related development

- Martin B-26 Marauder

Related lists

- List of military aircraft of the United States
- List of bomber aircraft
