= Martin B-26 Marauder =

1940 US medium bomber

B-26 Marauder
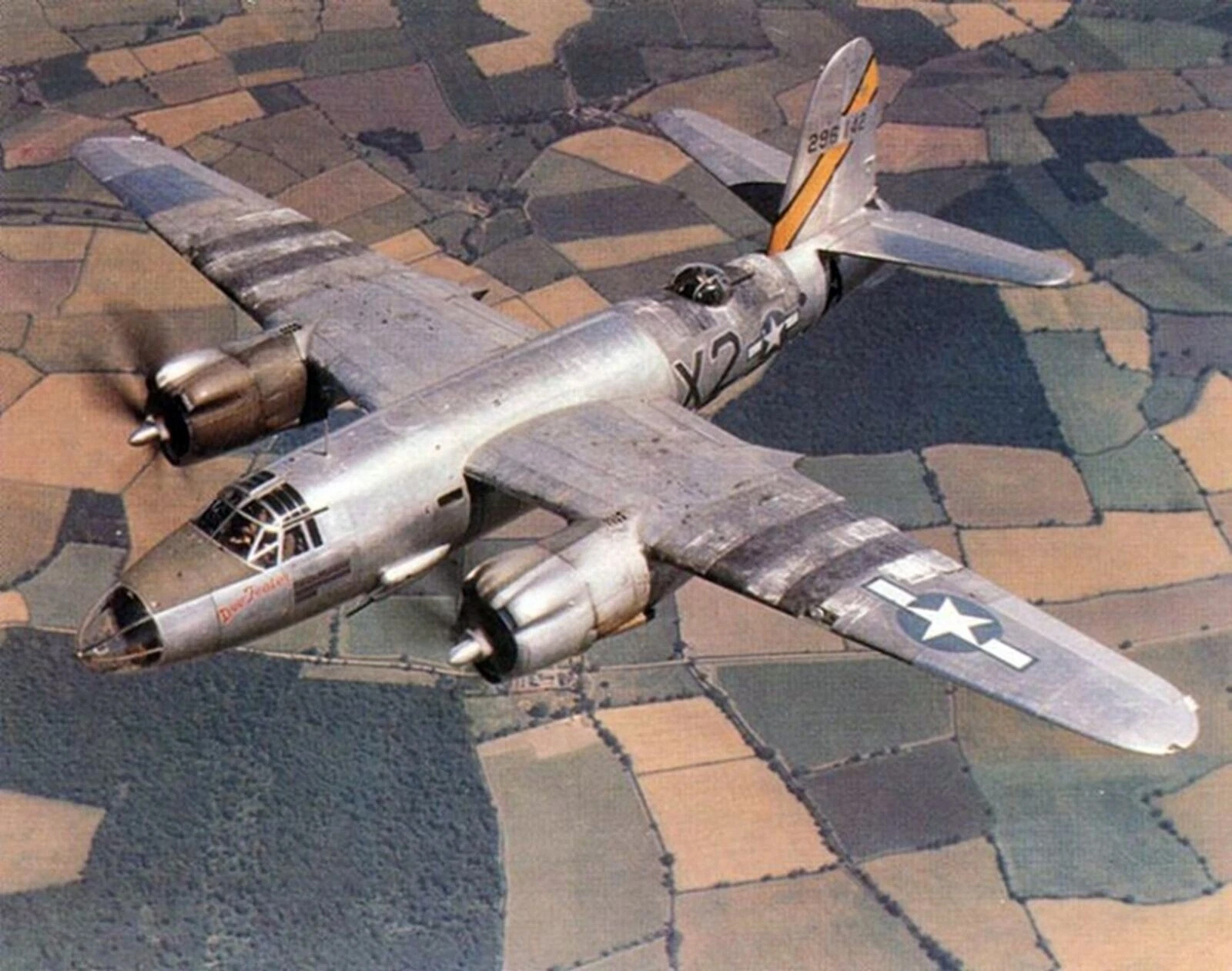
- A US Army Air Forces Martin B-26B Marauder "Dee-Feater" (X2-A) of the 596th BS 397th BG 9th AF with D-Day invasion stripes

General information
- Type: Medium bomber
- National origin: United States
- Manufacturer: Glenn L. Martin Company
- Status: Retired
- Primary users: United States Army Air Force Free French Air Force; Royal Air Force; South African Air Force
- Number built: 5,288 (Note: The 5,288 serial numbers published in Mendenhall's Deadly Duo effectively refutes the lesser count of the National Air and Space Museum.)

History
- Manufactured: 1941–1945
- Introduction date: 1941
- First flight: 25 November 1940
- Developed into: XB-33 Super Marauder (unbuilt)

The Martin B-26 Marauder is a twin-engined medium bomber designed and produced by the American aircraft manufacturer Glenn L. Martin Company.

Development of the B-26 started in 1939 in response to a United States Army Air Corps (USAAC) requirement for a new twin-engined bomber. Martin's proposal, internally designated as the Model 179, featured numerous firsts for the service, including powered turrets, self-sealing fuel tanks, and an all-plastic nose. Martin's submission was selected as the winner; by September 1940, almost 1,000 aircraft had been ordered. On 25 November 1940, the first B-26, effectively the prototype, performed its maiden flight; three months later, deliveries of production aircraft commenced to the United States Army Air Force (USAAF). The B-26 was built at two locations: Baltimore, Maryland, and Omaha, Nebraska, by Glenn L. Martin. In total, 5,288 aircraft were produced between February 1941 and March 1945; while the majority of B-26s were delivered to the USAAF, 522 aircraft were flown by the Royal Air Force and the South African Air Force. It saw extensive service during World War II, being first used in the Pacific Theater in early 1942. The majority of B-26s were deployed in the European and Mediterranean theatres, largely from bases in England and, following D-Day, on the European continent, providing tactical support to advancing Allied troops.

Early on in the B-26's service, it acquired the reputation of a "widowmaker" due to the early models' high accident rate during takeoffs and landings. This was because the Marauder had to be flown at precise airspeeds, particularly on final runway approach or when one engine was out. The unusually high 150 mph (240 km/h) speed on short final runway approach was intimidating to many pilots who were used to much slower approach speeds, and when they slowed to speeds below those stipulated in the manual, the aircraft would often stall and crash. The B-26 became a safer aircraft once crews were retrained, and after aerodynamic modifications (an increase of wingspan and wing angle-of-incidence to give better take-off performance, along with the adoption of a larger vertical stabilizer and rudder). By the end of World War II, the B-26 had achieved the lowest loss rate of any bomber operated by the USAAF. By the time the United States Air Force was created as an independent military service separate from the USAAF in 1947, all B-26s had been retired from US service. After the Marauder was retired, the unrelated ground attack aircraft Douglas A-26 Invader assumed the "B-26" designation, which led to confusion between the two aircraft.

== Design and development ==
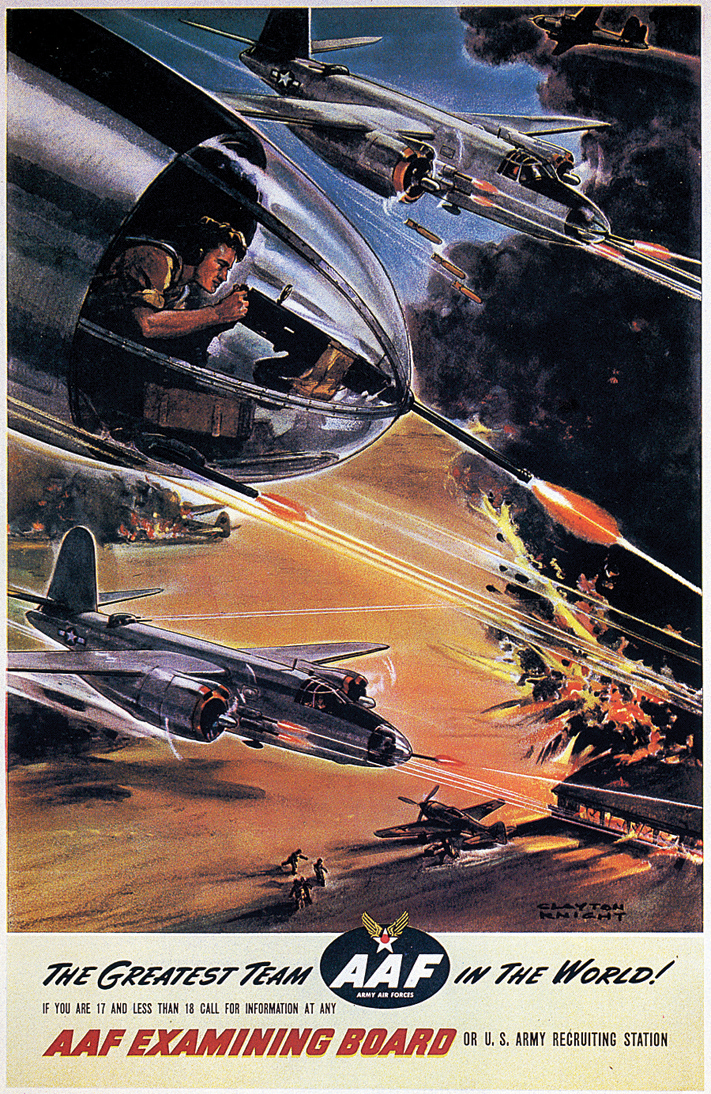
Army Air Forces recruiting poster featuring B-26 Marauders

On 11 March 1939, the United States Army Air Corps (USAAC) issued Proposal No. 39-640 specifying a twin-engined medium bomber capable of carrying a 3,000 lb (1,400 kg) bombload over a range of 2,000 miles (3,200 km) at a maximum speed in excess of 300 mph (480 km/h). It was also stipulated that the envisioned aircraft ought to be powered by one of several specific engines, these being the Wright R-2600-92 Twin Cyclone, the Pratt & Whitney R-2800 Double Wasp, and the Wright R-3350. Furthermore, a relatively short development schedule was specified; in addition to the selection being made within 6 months of issuing, the winner would be expected to commence delivery of production aircraft within 24 months of the production contract's issuing.

The Glenn L. Martin Company ordered its design team, headed by Peyton M. Magruder, to design a suitable aircraft to fulfil the requirement. To minimise drag, it was decided to adopt a completely circular cigar-shaped fuselage along with tricycle landing gear. While a twin-fin tail unit had been favoured early on, the design team instead opted for a single-fin arrangement as this provided better visibility for a tail gunner. Noting that no minimum landing speed had been stipulated, the design team opted for a high (for the era) wing loading that required a touch-down speed in excess of 100 mph (160 km/h). It was decided to power the type using a pair of then-experimental Pratt & Whitney R-2800 Double Wasp radial engines, installed within nacelles slung under the wing, each driving a four-bladed propeller. These engines were normally manufactured at the Ford Dearborn Engine plant in Dearborn, Michigan.

On 5 July 1939, the company submitted its response, which was internally designated Model 179. Following a competitive evaluation of the submissions, it was determined that the Model 179 was superior to all other proposals and thus Martin was awarded an initial production contract for 201 aircraft, which had been assigned the service designation B-26. Due to the urgency of the requirement and Martin having declaring that they were unlikely to be capable of providing all 385 aircraft sought by the requirement within the allocated timeframe, the second-place submission was also selected for production and ultimately entered service as the North American B-25 Mitchell. The B-26 went from the drawing board to an operational bomber in roughly two years. Additional orders for a further 930 B-26s followed in September 1940, even though to the type was yet to fly.

The B-26 was a shoulder-winged monoplane of all-metal construction, fitted with a tricycle landing gear. It had a streamlined circular-section fuselage housing the crew, consisting of a bombardier in the nose, armed with a .30 in (7.62 mm) machine gun, a pilot and co-pilot sitting side by side, with positions for the radio operator and navigator behind the pilots. The bombardier's position was within an all-plastic nose, which was a first for the USAAF. Furthermore, the B-26 was the first USAAF aircraft to be fitted with powered turrets, and one of the first to be fitted with a tail turret. The defensive armaments consisted of a dorsal turret armed with two .50 in (12.7 mm) machine guns and an additional .30 in (7.62 mm) machine gun that was fitted in the tail. (Note: Rare photos on pp. 61–62 show the original tail gun position for the B-26 Marauder 1A with the single .30 caliber replaced with a single .50 caliber, and tail gun position of the B-26B, which was upgraded from one .50 caliber to two .50 caliber machine guns.)

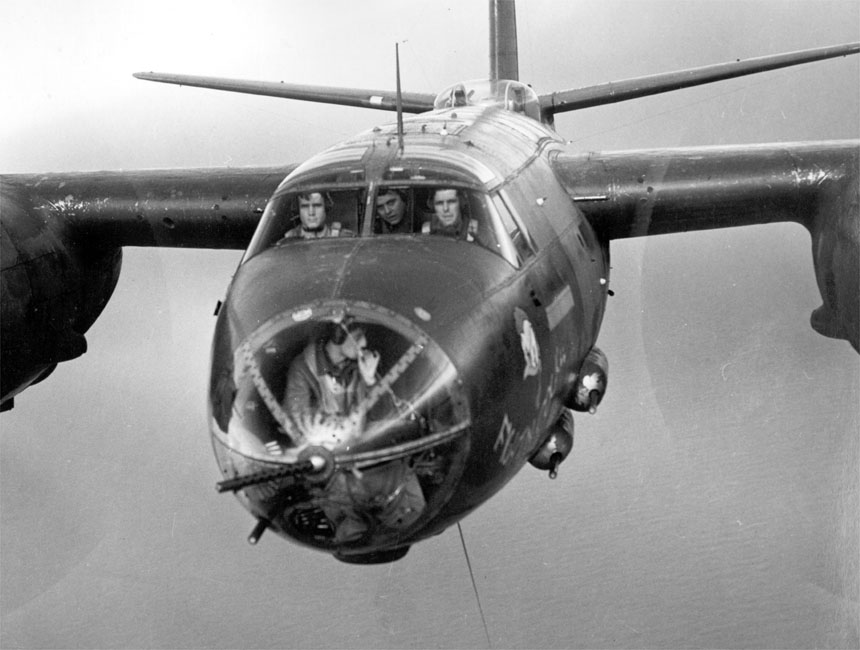
Closeup view of a B-26 in flight.

Two bomb bays were located within the middle of the fuselage, capable of carrying 5,800 lb (2,600 kg) of bombs, although in practice such a bomb load significantly reduced the aircraft's range, thus the aft bomb bay was usually fitted with additional fuel tanks instead of bombs. The B-26 was the first USAAF aircraft to be equipped with self-sealing fuel tanks. The wings were of low aspect ratio and relatively small in area for an aircraft of its weight, giving the required high performance, but also resulting in a wing loading of 53 lb/sq ft (260 kg/m^{2}) for the initial versions, which was the highest of any aircraft accepted for service by the USAAF prior to the introduction of the Boeing B-29 Superfortress, which possessed the then-astonishing wing loading of 69.12 lb/sq ft (337.5 kg/m^{2}) (although both would be considered lightly loaded by the standard of combat aircraft of the next decade). The aircraft's handling qualities, while not docile, were determined to be acceptable.

The first B-26, with Martin test pilot William K. "Ken" Ebel at the controls, flew on 25 November 1940 and was effectively the prototype. Following 133 hours of testing, the first four B-26s were deliveries to the USAAF in February 1941. One month later, the service started accelerated service testing of the type at Patterson Field, near Dayton, Ohio.

== Operational history ==
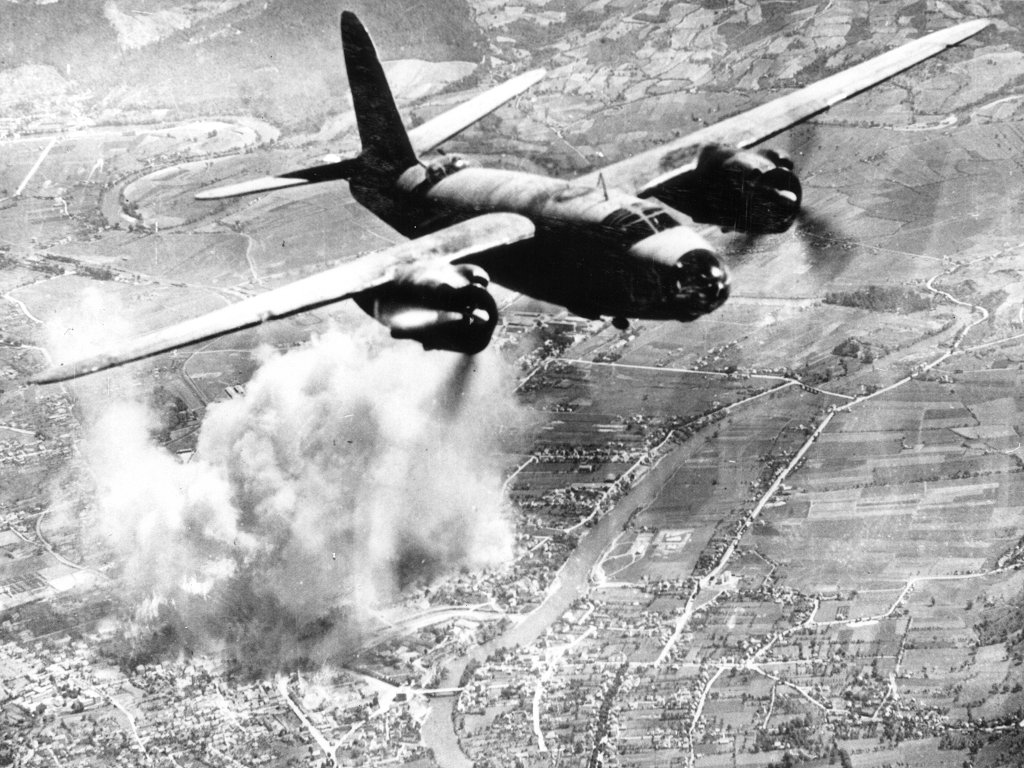
Royal Air Force B-26 flying over Banja Luka during World War II

The B-26 Marauder was used mostly in Europe and the Mediterranean, but also saw action in the Pacific theatre as well. In early combat, the aircraft took heavy losses, but was still regarded as being one of the most successful medium-range bombers flown by the USAAF.

By the end of World War II, it had flown more than 110,000 sorties, dropped 150,000 tons of bombs, and had been used in combat by British, Free French, and South African forces in addition to US units. In 1945, when production of the B-26 was terminated, 5,266 aircraft had been built.

=== Pacific Theater ===
The B-26 began to equip the 22nd Bombardment Group at Langley Field, Virginia, in February 1941, replacing the Douglas B-18 Bolo, with a further two groups, the 38th and 28th, beginning to equip with the B-26 by December 1941. Immediately following the Japanese Attack on Pearl Harbor, the 22nd BG was deployed to the South West Pacific, first by ship to Hawaii, then its air echelon flew the planes to Australia. The 22nd BG flew its first combat mission, an attack on Rabaul, which required an intermediate stop at Port Moresby, New Guinea, on 5 April 1942.

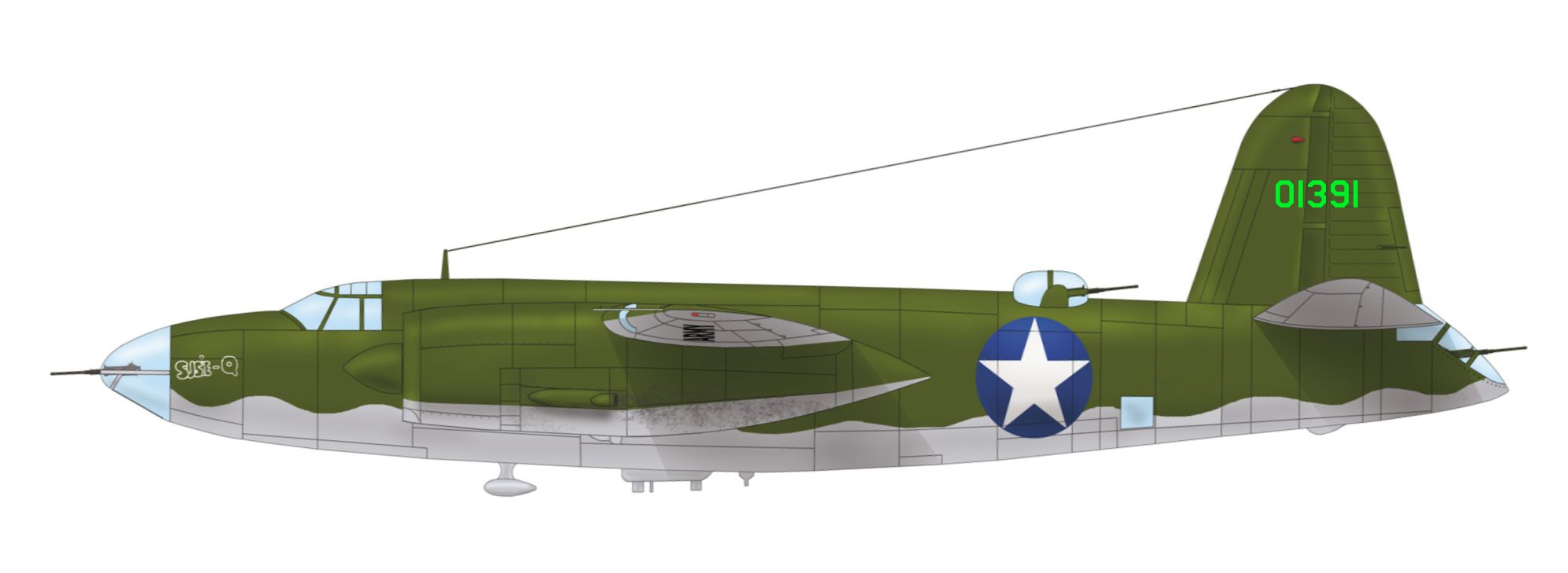
Susie Q, a B-26 torpedo bomber of the 18th Reconnaissance Squadron, was flown during the Battle of Midway on 4 June 1942.

A second group, the 38th, began receiving B-26s in November 1941 and began transitioning into them at Patterson Field, Ohio. There, the 38th continued the testing of the B-26, including its range and fuel efficiency. Immediately after the entry of the United States into World War II, plans were tentatively developed to send the 38th BG to the South West Pacific and to equip it with B-26Bs fitted with more auxiliary fuel tanks and provisions for carrying aerial torpedoes. Three 38th BG B-26Bs were detached to Midway Island in the buildup to the Battle of Midway, and two of them, along with two B-26s detached from the 22nd BG, carried out torpedo attacks against the Japanese Fleet on 4 June 1942. Two were shot down and the other two were so badly damaged that they were written off after the mission. Their torpedoes failed to hit any Japanese ships, although they did shoot down one Mitsubishi A6M Zero fighter and killed two seamen aboard the aircraft carrier Akagi with machine-gun fire. The crew of one B-26, Susie Q, after dropping their torpedo, were pursued by fighters; seeking an escape route, they flew directly along the length of the Akagi, braving antiaircraft fire – to the point the pursuing Japanese fighters had to hold fire temporarily, to avoid hitting the flagship. Another B-26, seriously damaged by antiaircraft fire, did not pull out of its run, and instead flew directly at Akagi's bridge. Either attempting a suicide ramming, or out of control, the plane narrowly missed striking the carrier's bridge, and crashed into the ocean.

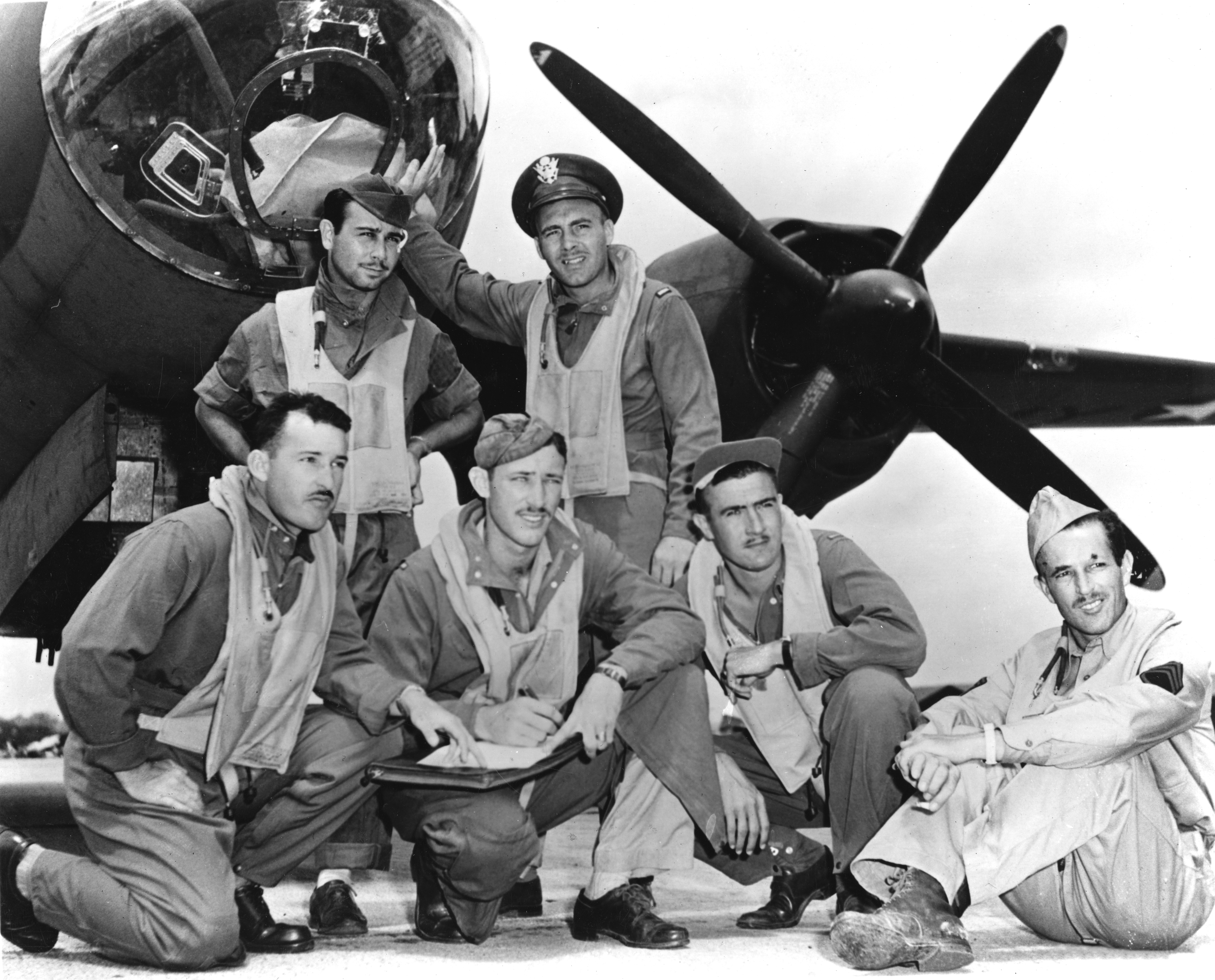
B-26 crew at Midway Island

From around June 1942, B-26 squadrons of the 38th BG were based in New Caledonia and Fiji. From New Caledonia, missions were flown against Japanese bases in the Solomon Islands. On one occasion, a B-26 was credited with shooting down a Kawanishi H6K flying boat. In 1943, the B-26 was decided to be phased out of operations in the South West Pacific Theater in favor of the North American B-25 Mitchell. Nevertheless, the 19th Bombardment Squadron of the 22nd BG continued to fly missions in the B-26. The B-26 flew its last combat mission in the theater on 9 January 1944.

Two more squadrons of torpedo-armed B-26s equipped the 28th Composite Group and were used for anti-shipping operations in the Aleutian Islands Campaign, but no records of any successful torpedo attack by a USAAF B-26 have been found.

Comedian George Gobel famously joked about being an instructor for this aircraft at Frederick Army Airfield (now Frederick Regional Airport) during the Pacific battles, boasting, "not one Japanese aircraft got past Tulsa".

=== Mediterranean Theater ===
USAAF B-26 flight instruction film.

Three bombardment groups were allocated to support the Allied invasion of French North Africa in November 1942. They were initially used to carry out low-level attacks against heavily defended targets, incurring heavy losses with poor results, before switching to medium-level attacks. By the end of the North African Campaign, the three B-26 groups had flown 1,587 sorties, losing 80 aircraft. This was double the loss rate of the B-25, which also flew 70 percent more sorties with fewer aircraft. Despite this, the B-26 continued in service with the Twelfth Air Force, supporting the Allied advance through Sicily, Italy, and southern France. A formation of B-26s, headed by Jimmy Doolittle, conducted the first USAAF bombing raid on Rome. Air Marshal Sir John Slessor, Deputy Commander-in-Chief Mediterranean Allied Air Forces, wrote of "the astonishing accuracy of the experienced medium bomber groups—particularly the Marauders; I think that the 42nd Bombardment Group in Sardinia is probably the best day-bomber unit in the world." Slessor in fact meant the 42nd Bomb Wing—17th, 319th, and 320th Bomb Groups—but a US 'wing' equated roughly to a British 'group', and vice versa.

=== Northwest Europe ===
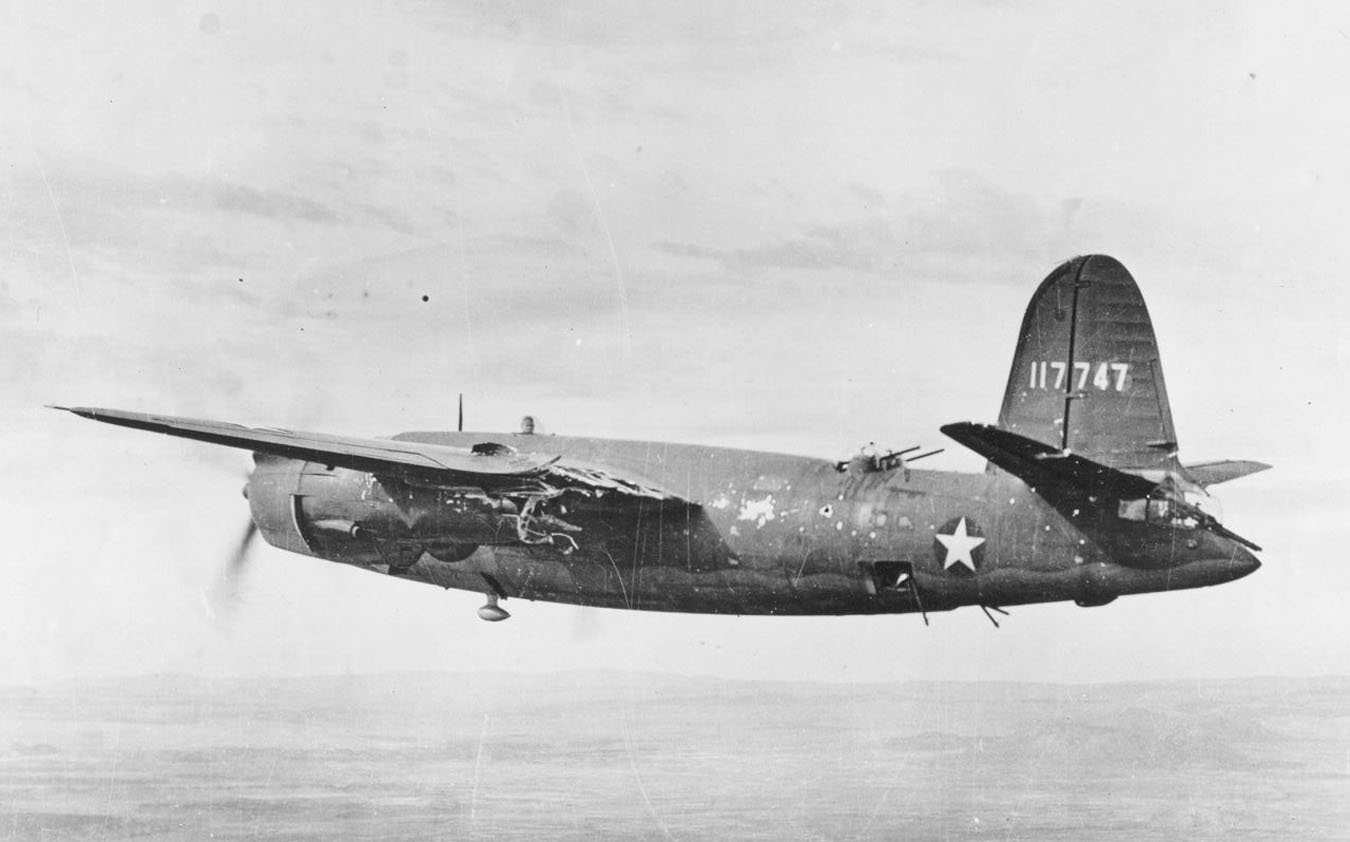
Martin B-26B-1-MA Marauder, AAF Ser. No. 41-17747, "Earthquake McGoon" of the 37th BS, 17th BG, shows extensive flak damage over Europe, September 1943.

The B-26 entered service with the Eighth Air Force in England in early 1943, with the 322nd Bombardment Group flying its first missions in May 1943. Operations were similar to those flown in North Africa with B-26s flying at low level and were unsuccessful. The second mission, an unescorted attack on a power station at IJmuiden, the Netherlands, resulted in the loss of the entire attacking force of 10 B-26s to anti-aircraft fire and Luftwaffe Focke-Wulf Fw 190 fighters. Following this disaster, the UK-based B-26 force was switched to medium-altitude operations, and transferred to the Ninth Air Force, set up to support the planned invasion of France.

Bombing from medium altitudes of 10,000 to 15,000 feet (3,000 to 4,600 m) and with appropriate fighter escort, the Marauder proved far more successful, striking against a variety of targets, including bridges and V-1 launching sites in the build-up to D-Day, and moving to bases in France as they became available. The Marauder, operating from medium altitude, proved to be a highly accurate aircraft, with the Ninth Air Force rating it the most accurate bomber available in the final month of the war in Europe. Loss rates were far lower than in the early, low-level days, with the B-26 stated by the Ninth Air Force as having the lowest loss rate in the European Theater of Operations at less than 0.5 percent. On 9 August 1944, Captain Darrell R. Lindsey of the 394th Bombardment Group led a formation of B-26s to destroy the L'Isle Adam bridge in German-occupied France. Despite his B-26 being heavily damaged by ground fire and engulfed in flames, he completed the bombing run and ordered his crew to parachute to safety, but refused to escape himself, ensuring their survival. Moments after the last crew member jumped, the plane exploded, killing Lindsey. He was posthumously awarded the Medal of Honor for his heroism.

The B-26 flew its last combat missions against the German garrison at the Île d'Oléron on 1 May 1945, with the last units disbanding in early 1946.

=== British Commonwealth ===
In 1942, a batch of 52 B-26A Marauders, designated Marauder I by the Royal Air Force (RAF), were offered to the United Kingdom under Lend-Lease. Like the earlier Martin Maryland and Baltimore, these aircraft were sent to the Mediterranean, replacing the Bristol Blenheims of 14 Squadron in Egypt. The squadron flew its first operational mission on 6 November 1942, being used for long-range reconnaissance, mine-laying and anti-shipping strikes. Unlike the USAAF, 14 Squadron used the equipment for carrying torpedoes, sinking several merchant ships with this weapon. The Marauder also proved useful in disrupting enemy air transport, shooting down considerable numbers of German and Italian transport aircraft flying between Italy and North Africa.

In 1943, deliveries of 100 long-wingspan B-26C-30s (Marauder II) allowed two squadrons of the South African Air Force, 12 Squadron and 24 Squadron to be equipped, these being used for bombing missions over the Aegean Sea, Crete, and Italy. A further 350 B-26Fs and Gs were supplied in 1944, with two more South African squadrons (21 and 30) joining No 12 and 24 in Italy to form an all-Marauder equipped wing, while one further SAAF squadron (25 Squadron) and the new RAF 39 Squadron, re-equipped with Marauders as part of the Balkan Air Force supporting Tito's Partisans in Yugoslavia. A Marauder of 25 Squadron SAAF, shot down on the unit's last mission of World War II on 4 May 1945, was the last Marauder lost in action. The British and South African aircraft were quickly scrapped following the end of the conflict as the United States did not want the return of the Lend-Lease aircraft.

=== France ===
Following Operation Torch, (the Allied invasion of North Africa), the Free French Air Force re-equipped three squadrons with Marauders for medium-bombing operations in Italy and the Allied invasion of southern France. These B-26s replaced Lioré et Olivier LeO 451s and Douglas DB-7s. Toward the end of the conflict, seven of the nine French Groupes de Bombardement used the Marauder, taking part in 270 missions with 4,884 aircraft sorties in combat. Free French B-26 groups were disbanded in June 1945. Replaced in squadron service by 1947, two aircraft lingered on as testbeds for the Snecma Atar jet engine, one of these remaining in use until 1958.

=== Executive transport ===
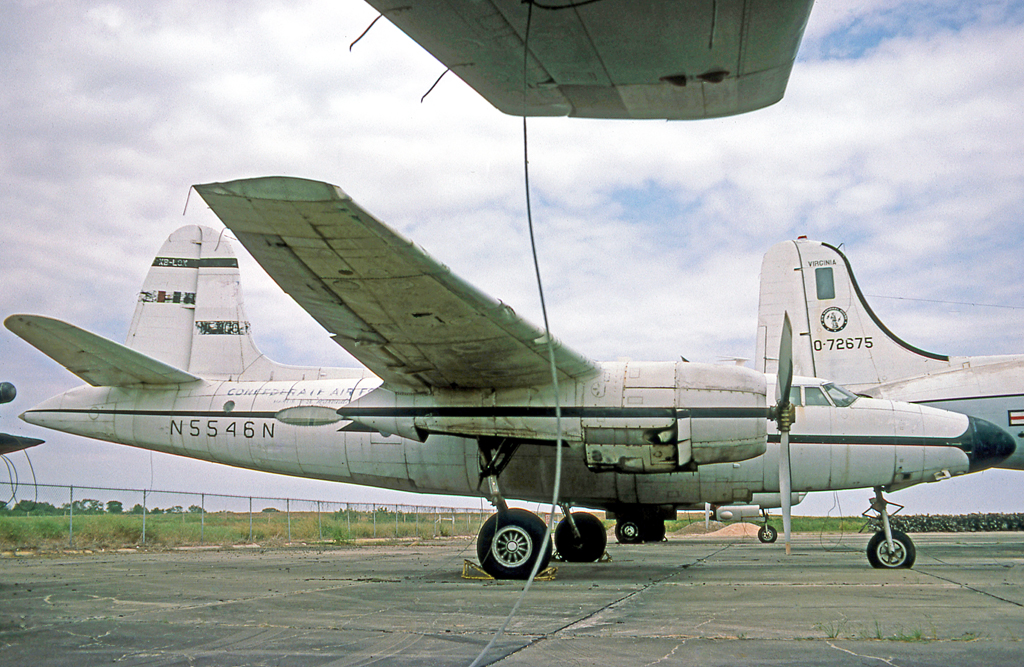
B-26C modified for corporate use in 1948 with faired nose and rear fuselage and added passenger windows

In the immediate postwar years, a few Marauders were converted as high-speed executive transports, accommodating up to 15 passengers. The specifications of the individual conversions differed considerably. The example shown in the image was completed in 1948 and had streamlined nose and tail fairings and windows inserted in the rear fuselage. It served United Airlines before being sold to Mexico. It was purchased by the Confederate Air Force and restored to wartime markings for air-display purposes before being lost in a fatal crash in 1995.

== Accidents ==
The B-26's relatively small wing area and resulting high wing loading required a high landing speed of 120 to 135 mph (193 to 217 km/h) indicated airspeed depending on load. At least two of the earliest B-26s suffered hard landings and damage to the main landing gear, engine mounts, propellers, and fuselage. The type was grounded briefly in April 1941 to investigate the landing difficulties. Two causes were found: insufficient landing speed (producing a stall) and improper weight distribution. The latter was due to the lack of a dorsal turret; the Martin power turret was not yet ready.

Some of the very earliest B-26s suffered collapses of the nose landing gear, said to be caused by improper weight distribution, but that is not likely to have been the only reason. The incidents occurred during low-speed taxiing, takeoffs and landings, and occasionally the strut unlocked. Later, the Martin electric dorsal turret was retrofitted to some of the first B-26s. Martin also began testing a taller vertical stabilizer and revised tail gunner's position in 1941.

The Pratt & Whitney R-2800-5 engines were reliable, but the Curtiss electric pitch-change mechanism in the propellers required impeccable maintenance, not always attainable in the field. Human error and some failures of the mechanism occasionally placed the propeller blades in flat pitch, resulting in an overspeeding propeller, sometimes known as a "runaway prop". Due to its sound and the possibility that the propeller blades could disintegrate, this situation was particularly frightening for aircrews. More challenging was a loss of power in one engine during takeoff. These and other malfunctions, as well as human error, claimed a number of aircraft and the commanding officer of the 22nd Bombardment Group, Colonel Mark Lewis.

The Martin B-26 suffered only two fatal accidents during its first year of flight, from November 1940 to November 1941—a crash shortly after takeoff near Martin's Middle River plant in Maryland (cause unknown, but engine malfunction strongly suggested) and the loss of a 38th Bombardment Group B-26 when its vertical stabilizer and rudder separated from the aircraft at altitude (cause unknown, but the accident report discussed the possibility that a canopy hatch broke off and struck the vertical stabilizer).

As pilots were trained quickly for the war, relatively inexperienced pilots entered the cockpit and the accident rate increased. This occurred at the same time as more experienced B-26 pilots of the 22nd, 38th, and 42nd Bombardment Groups were proving the merits of the bomber.

For a time in 1942, pilots in training often believed that the B-26 could not be flown on one engine. This belief was disproved by several experienced pilots, including Colonel Jimmy Doolittle, who flew demonstration flights at MacDill Army Air Field, which featured takeoffs and landings with only one engine. 17 Women Airforce Service Pilots were trained to demonstrate the B-26 in an attempt to "shame" male pilots into the air. Operationally, there were multiple instances of the B-26 successfully returning to base after live combat missions on only one engine.

In 1942, aviation pioneer and company founder Glenn L. Martin was called before the Senate Special Committee to Investigate the National Defense Program, (or also known as the "Truman Committee"), which was investigating defense contracting abuses. Senator Harry S Truman of Missouri, the committee chairman (and future Vice President and 33rd President of the United States in 1945–1953), asked Martin why the B-26 had problems. Martin responded that the wings were too short. Senator Truman curtly asked why the wings had not been changed. When Martin replied that the plans were too close to completion, and his company already had the contract, Truman's testy response was quick and to the point: In that case, the contract would be cancelled. Martin corrected the wings. (By February 1943, the newest model aircraft, the B-26B-10, had an additional 6 feet (1.8 m) of wingspan, plus uprated engines, more armor, and larger guns.)

Indeed, the regularity of crashes by pilots training at MacDill Field—up to 15 in one 30-day period—led to the exaggerated catchphrase, "One a day in Tampa Bay". Apart from accidents occurring over land, 13 Marauders ditched in Tampa Bay in the 14 months between 5 August 1942 and 8 October 1943.

B-26 crews gave the aircraft the nickname "Widowmaker". Other colorful nicknames included "Martin Murderer", "Flying Coffin", "B-Dash-Crash", "Flying Prostitute" (so-named because it was so fast and had "no visible means of support", referring to its small wings) and "Baltimore Whore" (a reference to the city where Martin was based).

According to an article in the April 2009 edition of AOPA Pilot on Kermit Weeks' "Fantasy of Flight", the Marauder had a tendency to "hunt" in yaw. This instability was similar to "Dutch roll" and would make for a very uncomfortable ride, especially for the tail gunner.

The B-26 is stated by the Ninth Air Force to have had the lowest combat loss rate of any US aircraft used during the war. Nevertheless, it remained a challenging aircraft to fly and continued to be disliked by some of its pilots throughout its military career. In 1944, in answer to many pilots complaining to the press and their relatives back home, the USAAF and Martin took the unusual step during war of commissioning large articles to be placed in various popular publications to educate the public and defend the flying/accident record of the B-26 against "slanders". One of the longest of these articles was published in the May 1944 issue of Popular Mechanics.

== Variants ==
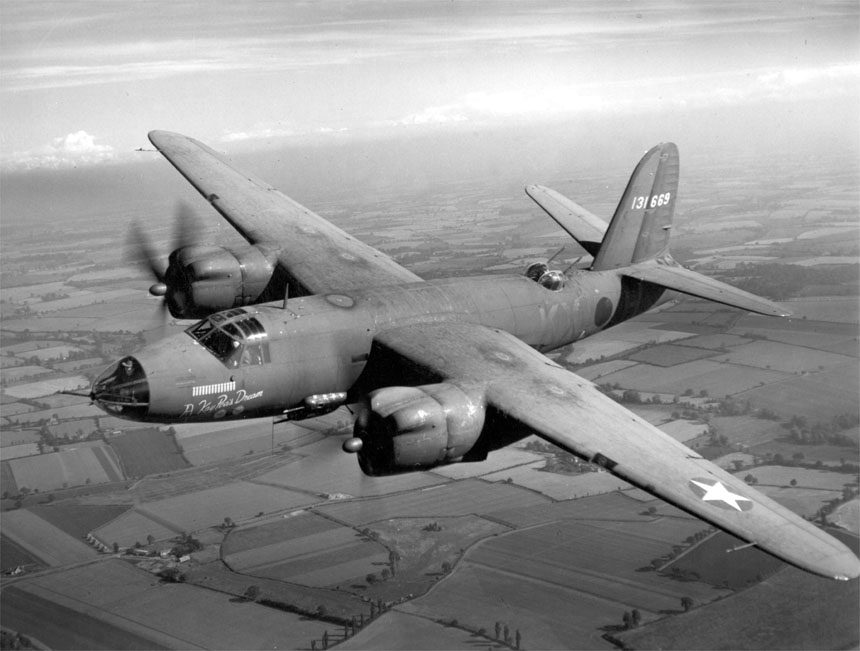
US Army Air Forces B-26B bomber in flight

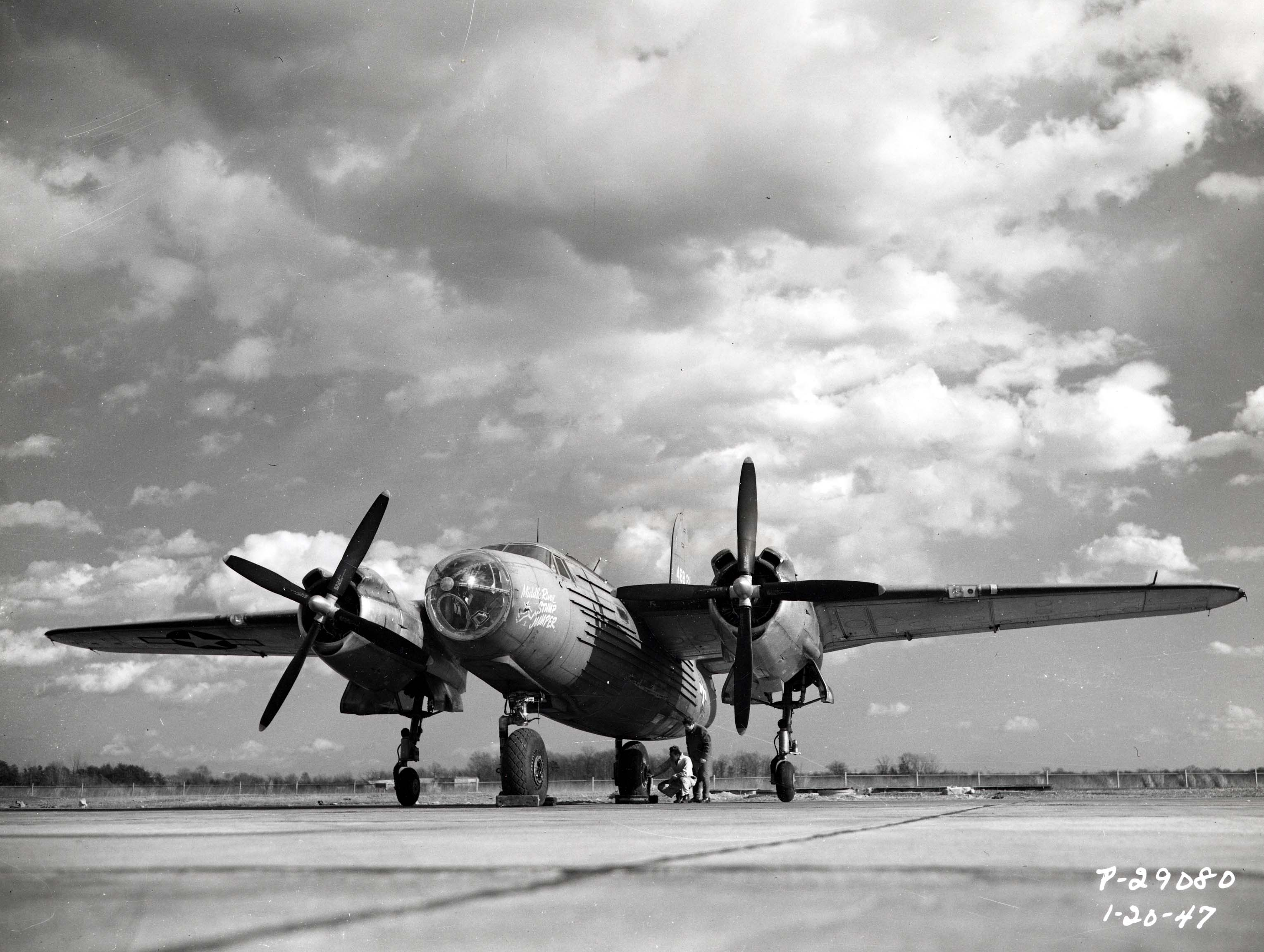
The lone XB-26H "Middle River Stump Jumper", used for testing "bicycle" landing gear

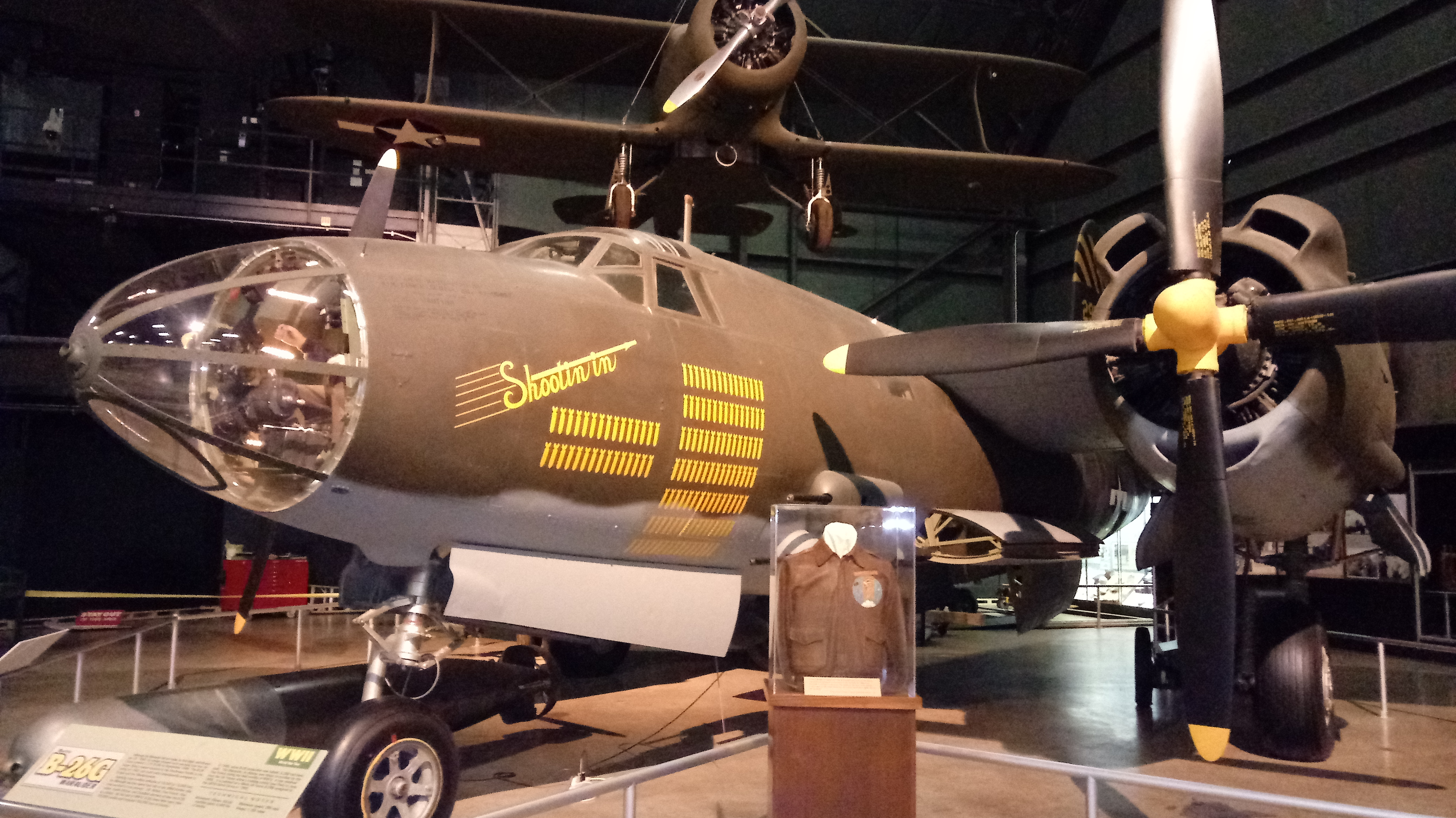
B-26G "Shootin' In" at Wright-Patterson National Air Force Museum

- B-26 — The first 201 planes were ordered based upon design alone. Prototypes were not characterized with the usual "X" or "Y" designations. They had Pratt & Whitney R-2800-5 engines. Armament consisted of two .30 caliber and two .50 caliber machine guns. (The last model was armed with nearly three times that number.) The approximate cost then was $80,200 per aircraft (equivalent to $1.84 million in 2025). 201 were built.
- B-26A — This incorporated changes made on the production line to the B-26, including upgrading the two .30 caliber machine guns in the nose and tail to .50 caliber. In total, 52 B-26As were delivered to the Royal Air Force, which were used as the Marauder Mk I. The approximate cost then was $102,700 per aircraft (equivalent to $2.36 million in 2025). 139 were built.
- B-26B — This model had further improvements on the B-26A, including revised tail gunner's glazing. Nineteen were delivered to the Royal Air Force as the Marauder Mk.IA. Production blocks of the 1,883 aircraft built:
  - AT-23A or TB-26B—208 B-26Bs converted into target tugs and gunnery trainers designated JM-1 by the US Navy
  - B-26B—Single tail gun replaced with twin guns; belly-mounted "tunnel gun" added (81 built)
  - B-26B-1—Improved B-26B. (225 built)
  - B-26B-2—Pratt & Whitney R-2800-41 radials (96 built)
  - B-26B-3—Larger carburetor intakes; upgrade to R-2800-43 radials (28 built)
  - B-26B-4—Improved B-26B-3 (211 built)
  - B-26B-10 through B-26B-55 — Beginning with block 10, the wingspan was increased from 65 to 71 feet (20 to 22 m) and flaps were added outboard of the engine nacelle to improve handling problems during landing caused by high wing loads. The vertical stabilizer height was increased from 19 feet 10 inches (6.05 m) to 21 feet 6 inches (6.55 m). Armament was increased from six to twelve .50 caliber machine guns; this was done in the forward section so that the B-26 could perform strafing missions. The tail gun was upgraded from manual to power operated. Armor was added to protect the pilot and copilot; 1,242 were built.
  - CB-26B—12 B-26Bs were converted into transport aircraft (all were delivered to the US Marine Corps for use in the Philippines).
- B-26C—This designation was assigned to those B-26Bs built in Omaha, Nebraska, instead of Baltimore, Maryland. Although nominally the B-26B-10 was the first variant to receive the longer wing, it was actually installed on B-26Cs before the B-26B-10, both being in production simultaneously. A total of 123 B-26Cs was used by the RAF and SAAF as the Marauder Mk II. The approximate cost then was $138,600 per aircraft (equivalent to $3.18 million in 2025). 1,210 were built.
  - TB-26C—Originally designated as AT-23B; this was a trainer modification of the B-26C (about 300 modified).
- XB-26D—This modified B-26 was used to test hot-air deicing equipment, in which heat exchangers transferred heat from engine exhaust to air circulated to the leading and trailing edges of the wing and empennage surfaces. This system, while promising, was not incorporated into any production aircraft made during World War II. (1 converted)
- B-26E—This modified B-26B was constructed to test the effectiveness of moving the dorsal gun turret from the aft fuselage to just behind the cockpit. The offensive and defensive abilities of the B-26E were tested in combat simulations against normal aircraft. Although the tests showed that gains were made with the new arrangement, they were insignificant. A cost analysis concluded that the benefit did not justify the effort needed to convert production lines for the new turret position (1 converted).
- B-26F—Angle-of-incidence of wings was increased by 3.5º; the fixed .50 caliber machine gun in the nose was removed; the tail turret and associated armor were improved. The first B-26F was produced in February 1944. One hundred of these were B-26F-1-MAs. Starting with 42-96231, a revised oil cooler was added, along with wing bottom panels redesigned for easier removal. In total, 200 of the 300 aircraft were B-26F-2s and F-6s, all of which were used by the RAF and SAAF as the Marauder Mk III. The F-2 had the Bell M-6 power turret replaced by an M-6A with a flexible canvas cover over the guns. The T-1 bombsight was installed instead of the M-series sight. British bomb fusing and radio equipment were provided (300 built).
- B-26G—This was a B-26F with standardized interior equipment. In total, 150 bombers were used by the RAF as the Marauder Mk III (893 built).
  - TB-26G—B-26G converted for crew training. Most, possibly all, were delivered to the US Navy as the JM-2 (57 converted).
- XB-26H—This test aircraft for tandem landing gear was nicknamed the "Middle River Stump Jumper" from its "bicycle" gear configuration, to see if it could be used on the Martin XB-48. (1 converted)
- JM-1P—A small number of JM-1s were converted into photo-reconnaissance aircraft for the US Navy.

Marauder I
British designation for 52 B-26As for the Royal Air Force.
Marauder IA
British designation for 19 B-26Bs for the Royal Air Force.
Marauder II
British designation for 123 B-26Cs for the Royal Air Force; 100 passed on to South African Air Force.
Marauder III
British designation for 200 B-26F and 150 B-26G for the Royal Air Force and South African Air Force.

With the exception of the B-26C, all models and variants of the B-26 were produced at Martin's Middle River manufacturing plant. The B-26C was built at the Martin plant in Omaha.

== Operators ==
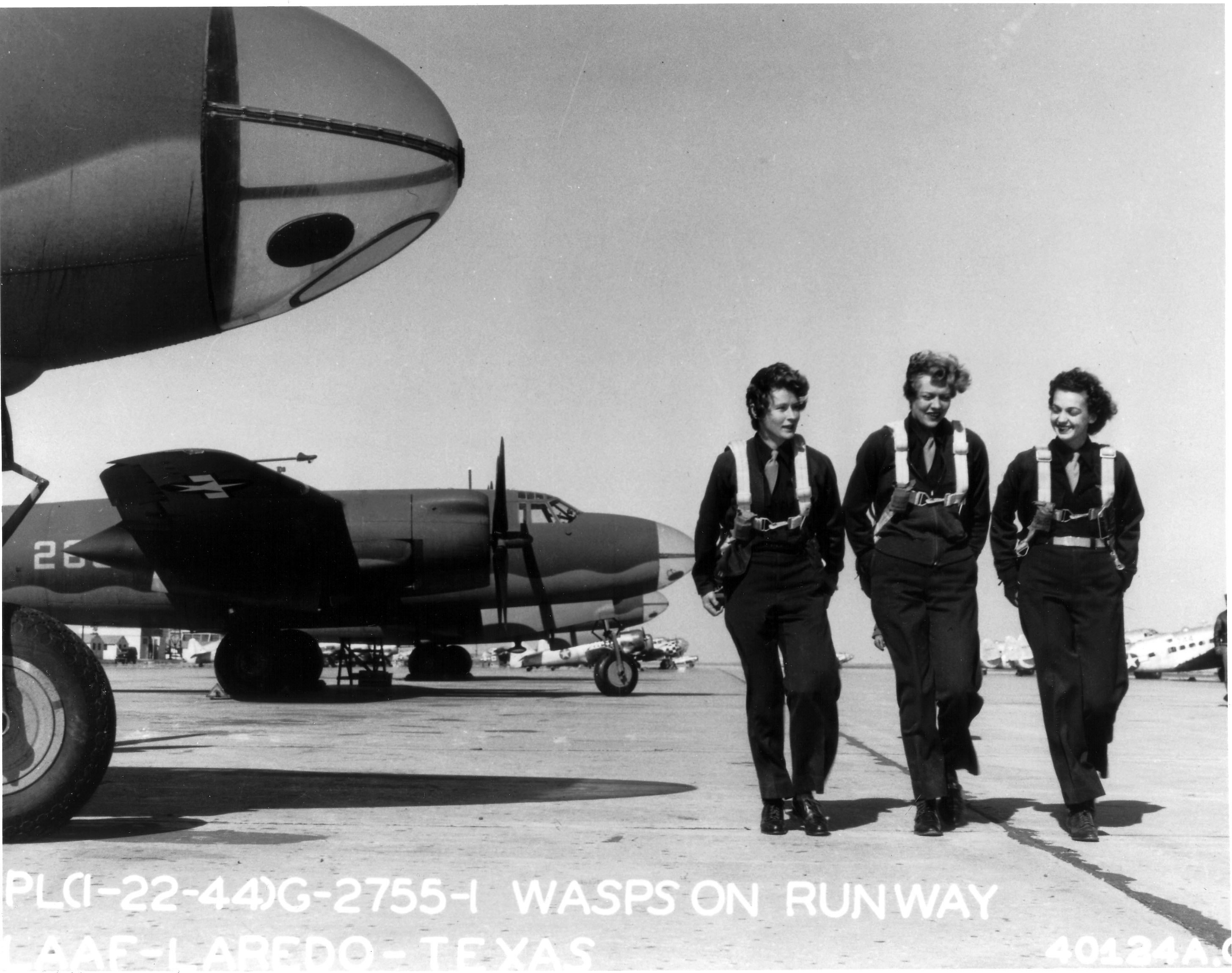
WASPs on flightline at Laredo Army Air Field, Texas, 22 January 1944

France

- Free France

South Africa

- South African Air Force

Turkey

- Turkish Air Force

United Kingdom

- Royal Air Force

USA

- United States Army Air Corps
- United States Army Air Forces
- United States Marine Corps
- United States Navy

== Surviving aircraft ==
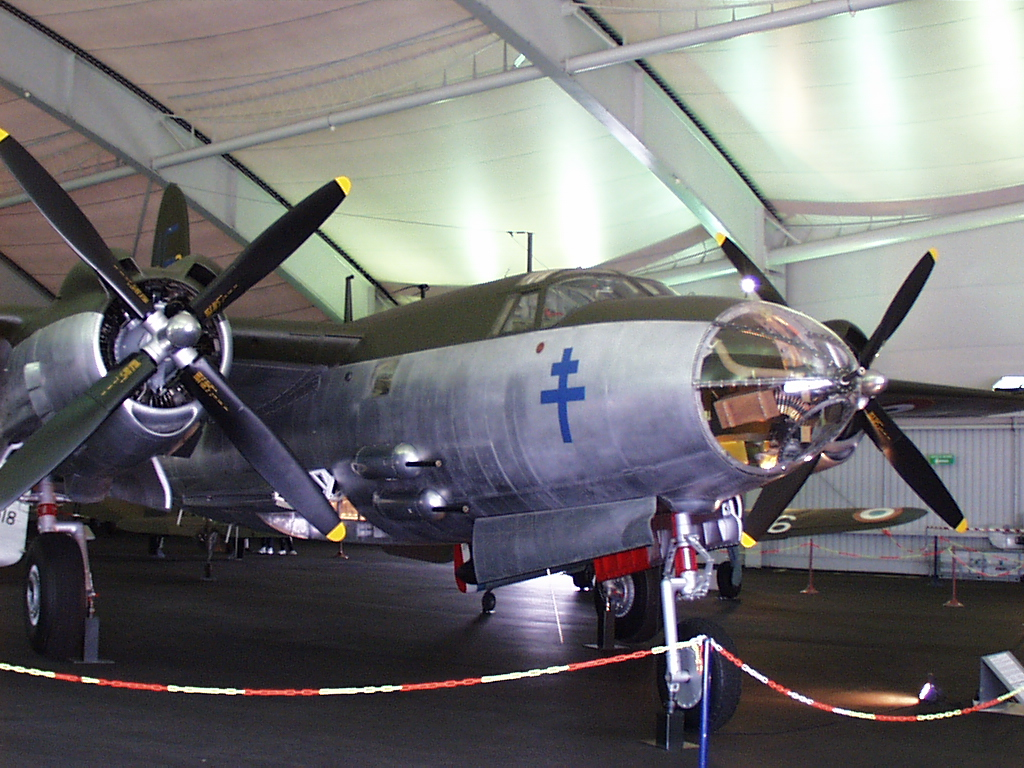
Martin B-26 Marauder in Free French Air Forces livery on display at Le Bourget

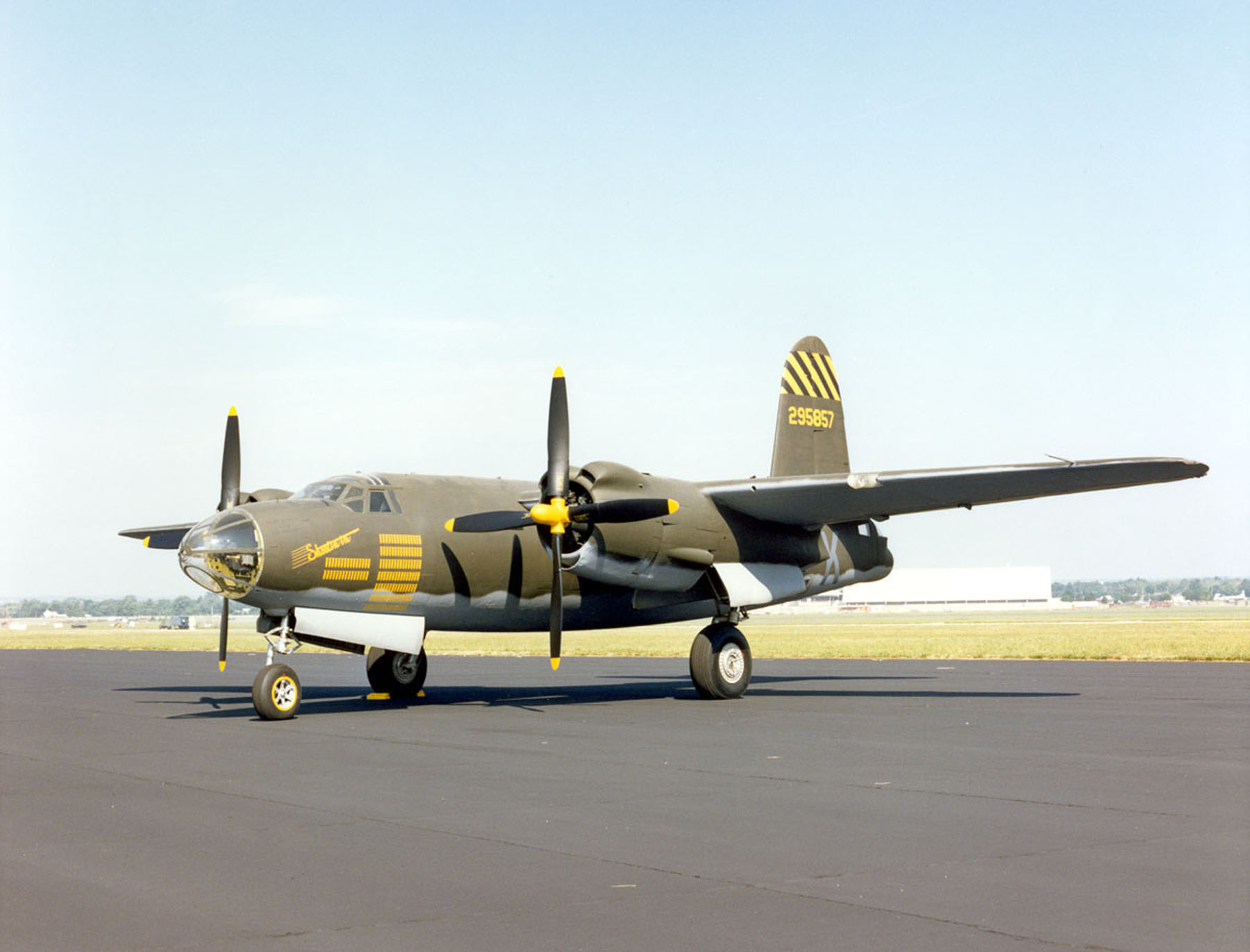
Martin B-26G-11-MA Marauder, 43-34581, at the National Museum of the United States Air Force, marked as B-26B-50-MA, 42-95857, written off in an accident on 19 April 1945.

=== France ===
B-26G

- 44-68219 Dinah Might - Utah Beach Museum (Musée du Débarquement Utah Beach) on loan from the Musée de l'Air et de l'Espace in Le Bourget. It was previously recovered from the Air France training school.

=== United States ===
Airworthy

B-26

- 40-1464 – part of the Fantasy of Flight collection in Polk City, Florida.

On display

B-26

- 40-1459 Charley's Jewel – MAPS Air Museum in Akron, Ohio.

B-26G

- 43-34581 Shootin In – National Museum of the United States Air Force at Wright-Patterson AFB in Dayton, Ohio. This aircraft was flown in combat by the Free French Air Force during the final months of World War II. It was obtained from the mechanics' training school of French airline Air France near Paris in June 1965. It is painted as a 9th Air Force B-26B assigned to the 387th Bombardment Group in 1945.

Under restoration

B-26

- 40-1370 – for display by Aircraft Restoration Services LLC, Murrieta, California.

B-26B

- 41-31856 – for display at Aircraft Restoration Services LLC, French Valley Airport, Murrieta, California for the Pima Air & Space Museum, in Tucson, Arizona.
- 41-31773 Flak-Bait – for display at the Steven F. Udvar-Hazy Center of the National Air and Space Museum in Chantilly, Virginia. This aircraft survived 207 operational missions over Europe, more than any other American aircraft during World War II.

== Specifications (B-26G) ==
3-view line drawing of the Martin B-26B/C Marauder

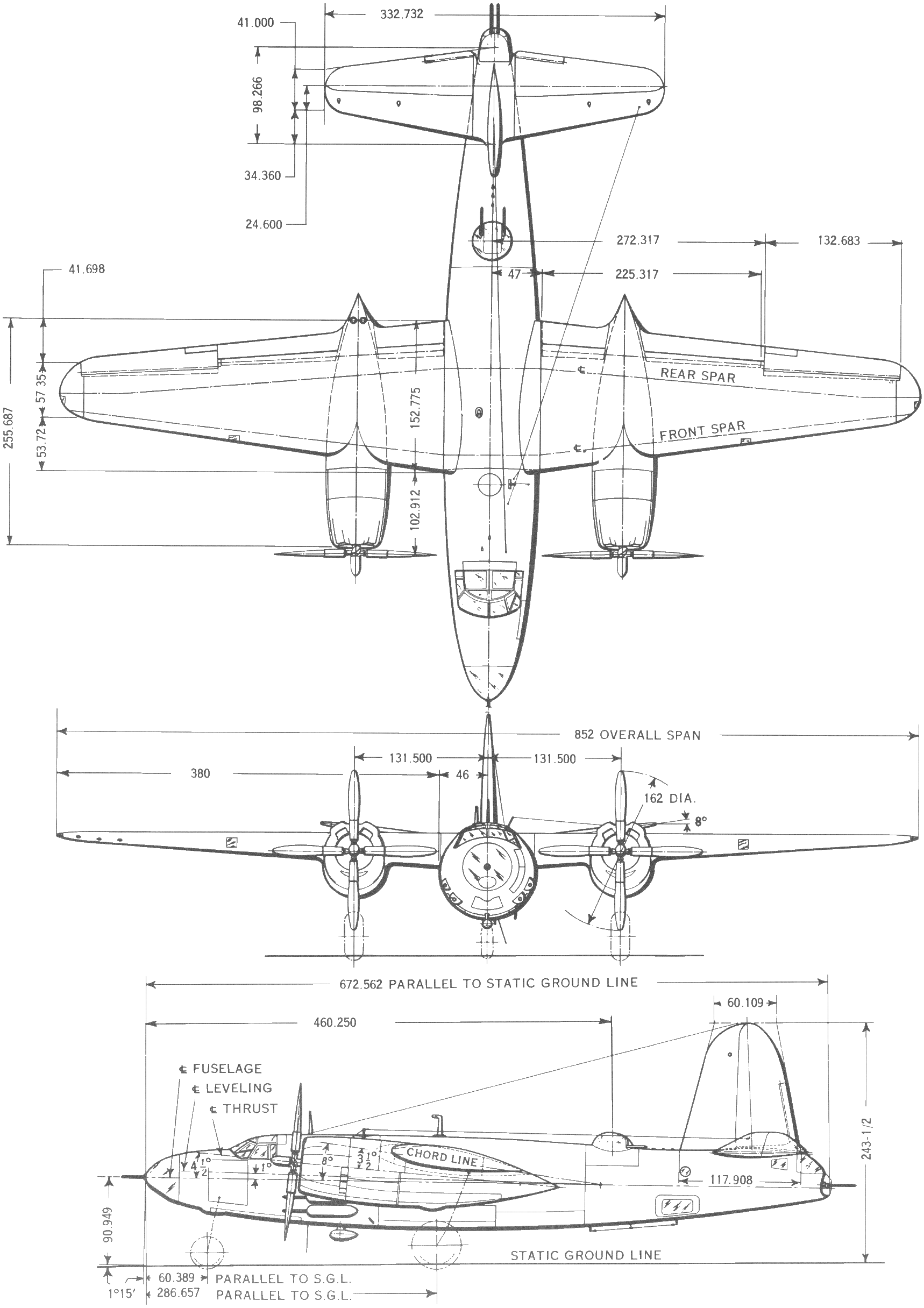
3-view line drawing of the Martin B-26F/G Marauder

Data from Quest for Performance and Jane's Fighting Aircraft of World War II

General characteristics

- Crew: Seven (consisting of two pilots, bombardier/radio operator, navigator/radio operator, and three gunners)
- Length: 58 ft 3 in (17.75 m)
- Wingspan: 71 ft 0 in (21.64 m)
- Height: 21 ft 6 in (6.55 m)
- Wing area: 658 sq ft (61.1 m^{2})
- Airfoil: root: NACA 0017-64; tip: NACA 0010-64
- Empty weight: 24,000 lb (10,886 kg)
- Gross weight: 37,000 lb (16,783 kg)
- Powerplant: 2 × Pratt & Whitney R-2800-43 Double Wasp 18-cylinder radial piston engines, 2,000–2,200 hp (1,500–1,600 kW) each
- Propellers: 4-bladed constant-speed feathering propellers

Performance

- Maximum speed: 287 mph (462 km/h, 249 kn) at 5,000 ft (1,500 m)
- Cruise speed: 216 mph (348 km/h, 188 kn)
- Landing speed: 114 mph (99 kn; 183 km/h)
- Combat range: 1,150 mi (1,850 km, 1,000 nmi) with 3,000 lb (1,400 kg) bomb load and 1,153 US gal (960 imp gal; 4,365 L) of fuel
- Ferry range: 2,850 mi (4,590 km, 2,480 nmi)
- Service ceiling: 21,000 ft (6,400 m)
- Rate of climb: 1,200 ft/min (6.1 m/s)
- Power/mass: 0.10 hp/lb (0.16 kW/kg)

Armament

- Guns: 11 × .50 in (12.7 mm) M2 Browning machine guns. One flexible in nose position, four fixed in blisters on fuselage (fired by the pilot), two in dorsal turret, two in tail turret, one each in port and starboard lower waist positions
- Bombs: Up to 4,000 lb (1,800 kg)

== Media appearances ==
The wartime training film How to Fly the B-26 Airplane was released in 1944, with actor Don Porter playing the part of the pilot.

== See also ==
Related development

- Martin XB-27
- Martin XB-33 Super Marauder

Aircraft of comparable role, configuration, and era

- de Havilland Mosquito
- Dornier Do 217
- Douglas A-26 Invader
- Mitsubishi G4M
- North American B-25 Mitchell
- Vickers Wellington

Related lists

- List of aircraft of World War II
- List of bomber aircraft
- List of military aircraft of the United States
