= Admiral Shepard =

Admiral Shepard may refer to:

- Alan Shepard (1923–1998), astronaut and U.S. Navy rear admiral
- Dwight Shepherd (born c. 1961), U.S. Navy rear admiral
- Edwin M. Shepard (1843–1904), U.S. Navy rear admiral
