= Dwight Shepherd =

US Navy officer (born c. 1961)

Rear Admiral Dwight Shepherd
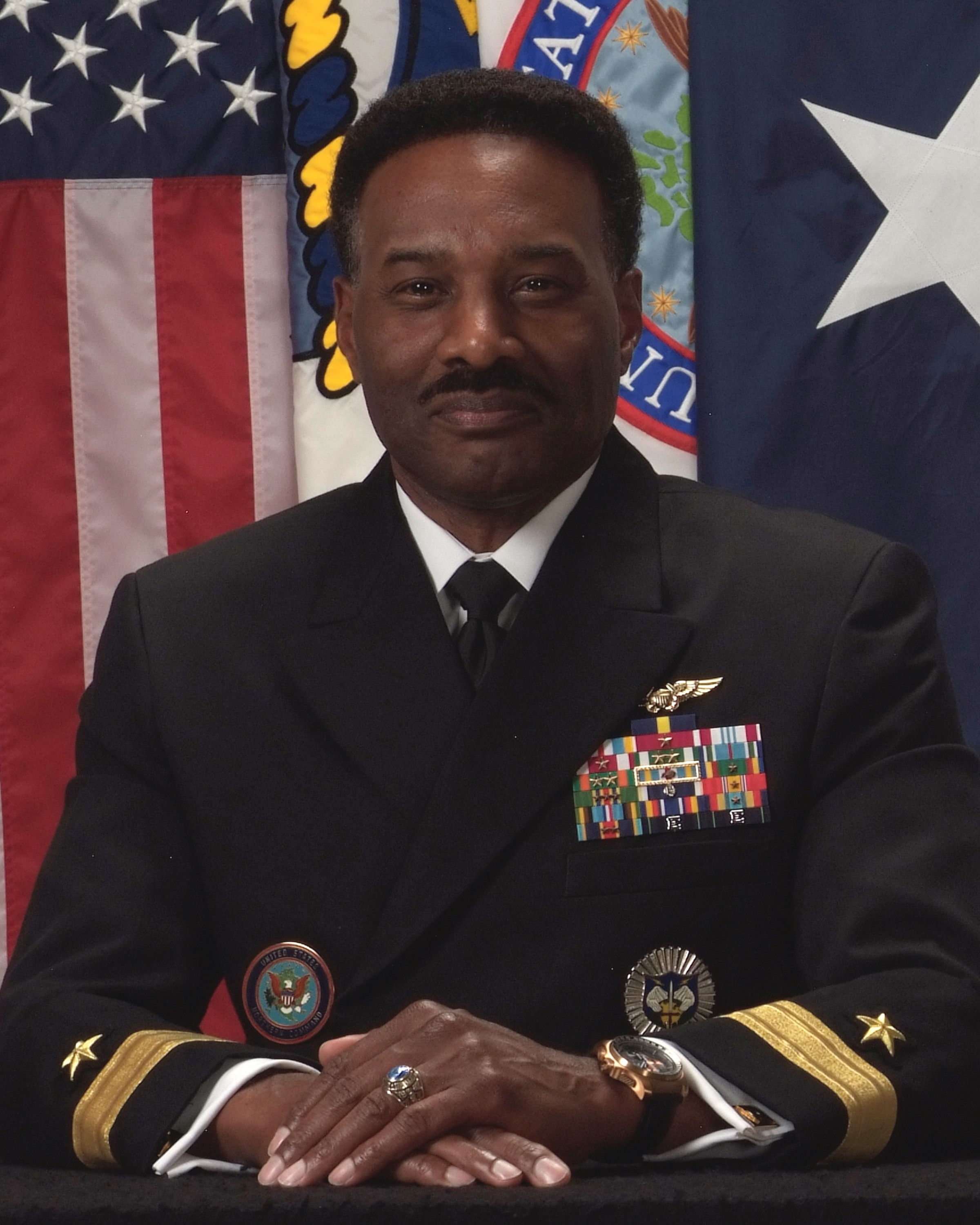
- Rear Admiral Dwight Shepherd, USN, c. 2014
- Born: c. 1961 (age 64–65)
- Education: University of Cincinnati (BS); Industrial College of the Armed Forces (MS)
- Military career
- Allegiance: United States of America
- Branch: United States Navy
- Service years: 1984–2016
- Rank: Rear admiral (lower half)
- Commands: Strategic Communications Wing One; Fleet Air Reconnaissance Squadron 3 (VQ-3)
- Awards: Navy Distinguished Service Medal; Defense Superior Service Medal; Legion of Merit (2); Defense Meritorious Service Medal; Meritorious Service Medal (2); Navy and Marine Corps Commendation Medal (3); Joint Service Achievement Medal; Navy and Marine Corps Achievement Medal (3)

Rear Admiral Dwight Shepherd (born c. 1961) is a retired United States Navy officer and career Naval Flight Officer who last served as Director of Cyberspace Operations, J6, at U.S. Northern Command/ North American Aerospace Defense Command (NORAD) from June 2014 to August 2016. Before that, he served as Director of Manpower and Personnel, J1, on the Joint Staff from June 2012 to June 2014 and as the Senior Military Assistant to the Secretary of the Navy, Ray Mabus, from April 2011 to June 2012.

== Early life and education ==
Shepherd is a native of Cleveland, Ohio, and graduated from the University of Cincinnati in 1983, earning a Bachelor of Science in Business Administration, majoring in Marketing. He also earned a Master of Science in 2006 from the Industrial College of the Armed Forces (ICAF), in National Resource Strategy.

== Military career ==
Shepherd was commissioned as an ensign in the United States Navy in June 1984 and earned his Naval Flight Officer wings in July 1985. Shepherd's operational command tours include Fleet Air Reconnaissance Squadron 3 (VQ-3), the Navy’s largest aviation squadron. His major command was Strategic Communications Wing One and Task Force 124. He was the first black officer to command a "take charge and move out" (TACAMO) squadron and air wing.

His operational tours include Patrol Special Projects Unit (VPU) 2 (Avionics Division Officer), VQ-3 (Naval Air Training and Operating Procedures (NATOPS), flight officer and maintenance officer), and Commander Task Force 70/75/Carrier Strike Group 5 (N6/IWC), Yokosuka, Japan, aboard USS Kitty Hawk (CV-63).

His shore tours include Bureau of Naval Personnel/PERS-43 (Initial Assignment and VQ/Force Support detailer), Naval Training Support Unit (NTSU) (NATOPS evaluator/instructor), U.S. Strategic Command (TACAMO/ABNCP current ops officer), and Office of the Chief of Naval Operations (OPNAV)/N6F (executive assistant), OPNAV N00X (strategic alignment branch head), senior military assistant to the secretary of the Navy, and director, Manpower and Personnel, J1, Joint Staff.

Shepherd retired from the United States Navy with 32 years of service in August 2016.

== Post-military career ==
Shepherd served as the Vice President of Client Relations at General Dynamics Information Technology/CSRA Inc. from November 2016 to January 2019. He has also served as President of his consulting firm, Dwight Shepherd Consulting and More, LLC, since December 2018.

He has also served on the Board of Directors at Steampunk, a cybersecurity company, since October 2019.

== Personal ==
In the 2024 United States presidential election, Shepherd endorsed Kamala Harris.
