= Margaret D. Klein =

United States Navy admiral

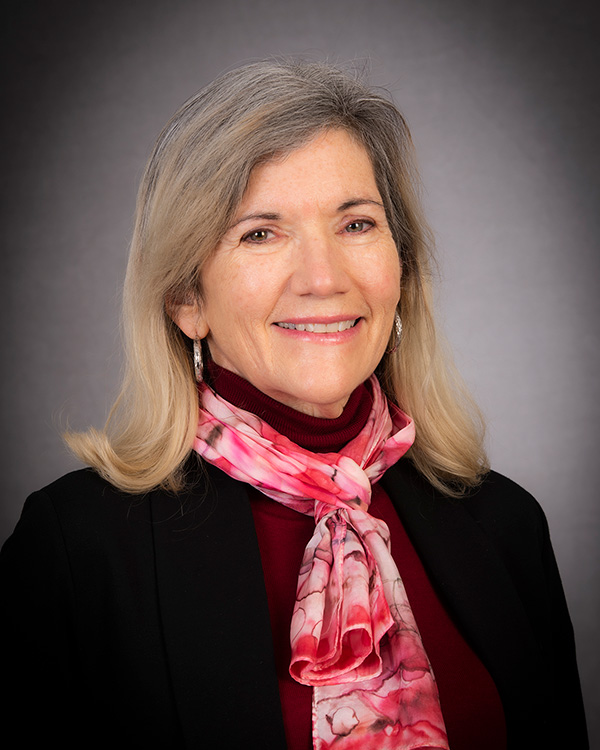
- Klein in 2021
- Born: 1957 (age 68–69); Weymouth, Massachusetts
- Military career
- Allegiance: United States
- Branch: United States Navy
- Service years: 1981–2017
- Rank: Rear Admiral
- Commands: Expeditionary Strike Group Five; Strategic Communications Wing One; Fleet Air Reconnaissance Squadron Three
- Conflicts: Operation Enduring Freedom; Operation Iraqi Freedom
- Awards: Defense Superior Service Medal; Legion of Merit (5); Defense Meritorious Service Medal; Meritorious Service Medal (3); Navy and Marine Corps Commendation Medal (3); Navy and Marine Corps Achievement Medal

Margaret DeLuca "Peg" Klein is a former United States Navy officer who held the rank of rear admiral at the time of her retirement in March 2017. She currently serves as the dean of the College of Leadership and Ethics at the Naval War College.

Klein was the 82nd commandant of midshipmen at the United States Naval Academy from December 2006 to June 2008 and was responsible for the military and professional development of the Brigade of Midshipmen. She was the first woman to ever hold this position, and by virtue of the position, she was second in command at the Naval Academy after the superintendent. She was nominated for the one-star rank of rear admiral (lower half) on 1 April 2008. Later, she served as the commander of Expeditionary Strike Group Five and then as chief of staff for United States Cyber Command. As her final active duty assignment, Klein was named by U.S. secretary of defense Chuck Hagel to serve as his senior advisor for military professionalism on March 27, 2014. She retired from the Navy in 2017.

== Naval career ==
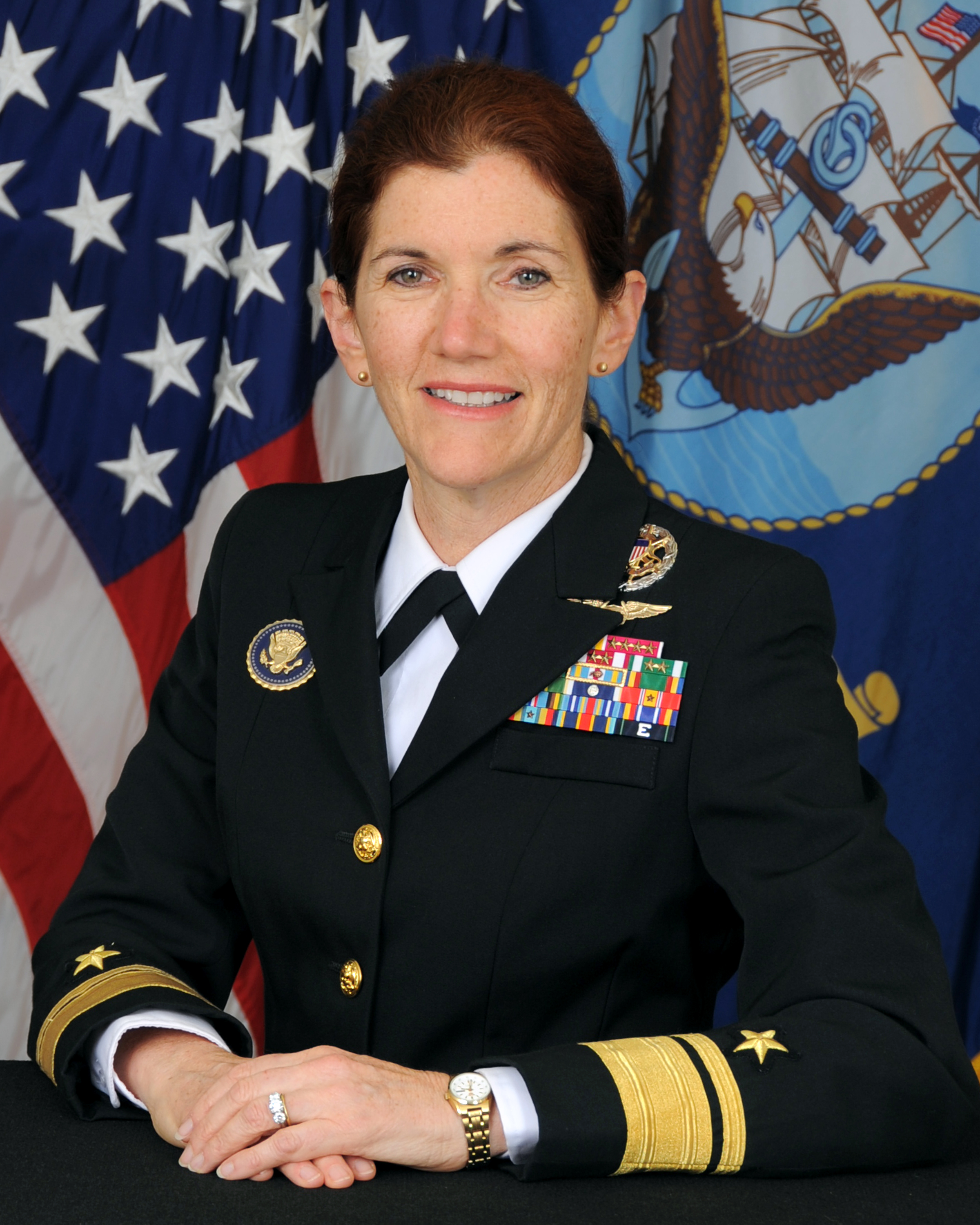
Rear Admiral Klein

Klein was born in Weymouth, Massachusetts, and has three younger sisters. She was commissioned in 1981 upon graduation from the United States Naval Academy with a Bachelor of Science degree. Klein was designated a naval flight officer in 1983 and reported to the "Ironmen" of Fleet Air Reconnaissance Squadron Three at Naval Air Station Barbers Point, Hawaii. There she qualified as mission commander and airborne communications officer in the EC-130Q. In 1987, she reported to the staff of Commander, Naval Air Forces, United States Atlantic Fleet, where she was responsible for ensuring enlisted personnel readiness. In 1988, Klein transferred to the Naval Military Personnel Command, where she served as aviation initial assignments officer and VQ detailer.

In 1991, Klein returned to VQ-3 for her department head tour, flying the E-6A as the squadron moved from Hawaii to Tinker Air Force Base in Oklahoma City. From Oklahoma, she was selected to serve in the White House Military Office in the Presidential Contingency Plans Directorate. She then screened for aviation command. Klein was selected as a Brookings Legislative Fellow in 1997 and served on the staff of Senator Olympia Snowe, briefing defense issues.

In 1999, Klein received a Master of Education degree from the University of Southern Maine. The same year, Klein returned to the Ironmen for a third tour to serve as Executive Officer and Commanding Officer. The Ironmen won the Battle E and the Maintenance Excellence Award during her command tour. After leaving squadron command, Klein served aboard USS Kitty Hawk Battle Group Staff as the N6. During her tour on the Carrier Group Five staff, the Battle Group participated in Operation Enduring Freedom and in Operation Iraqi Freedom.

Klein returned to Oklahoma to serve as deputy, then wing commander of Task Force 124 and Strategic Communications Wing One. Upon completion of major command, she was assigned to the staff of Commander, Carrier Strike Group Eight where she served as the chief of staff for the Eisenhower Strike Group until her selection as the 82nd commandant of midshipmen at the United States Naval Academy.

Secretary of Defense Chuck Hagel on March 27, 2014, announced that Klein would "serve as ... Senior Advisor for Military Professionalism, reporting directly to [Hagel] on issues related to military ethics, character, and leadership ... Rear Admiral Klein will coordinate the actions of the Joint Staff, the Combatant Commands, and each of the military services – working directly with the service secretaries and the service chiefs – on DoD's focus on ethics, character, and competence in all activities at every level of command with an uncompromising culture of accountability. This will continue to be a top priority for DoD's senior leadership."

Klein's personal awards include the Defense Superior Service Medal, Legion of Merit (five awards), the Defense Meritorious Service Medal, the Meritorious Service Medal (three awards), the Navy and Marine Corps Commendation Medal (three awards) and the Navy and Marine Corps Achievement Medal. In April 2022, Klein was named a Distinguished Graduate by the United States Naval Academy Alumni Association.

== Academic career ==
Klein was named dean of the College of Leadership and Ethics at the Naval War College after her retirement from active duty in 2017. While serving in this position, she completed an Ed.D. degree at the University of Pennsylvania.

Military offices
Preceded by Bruce E. Grooms	Commandant of Midshipmen; 2006–2008	Succeeded by Matthew L. Klunder
