= David Norvell Walker Grant =

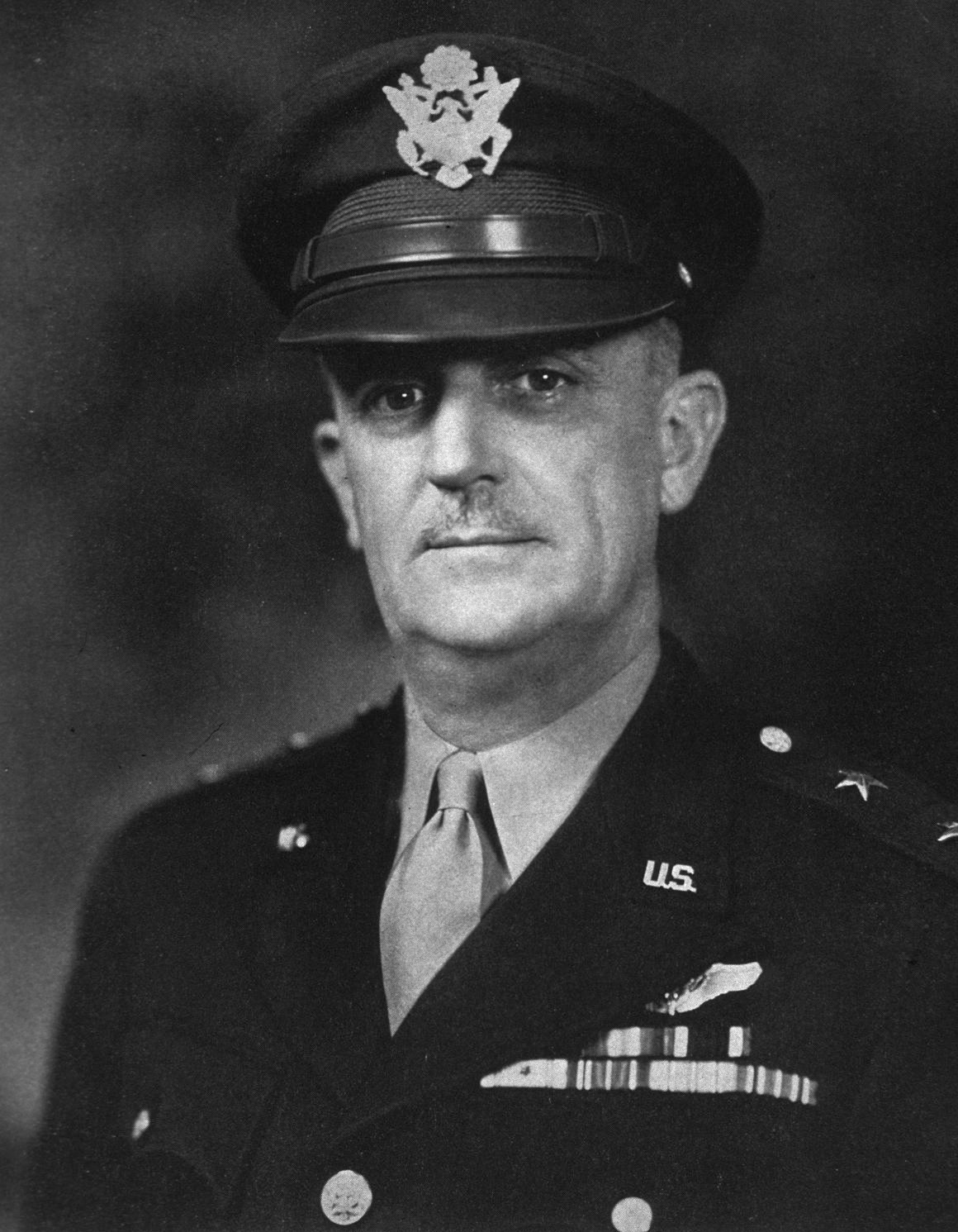
David N.W. Grant

Major General Dr. David Norvell Walker Grant (May 14, 1891 – August 15, 1964), Medical Corps, U.S. Army Air Forces, is considered by most authorities as the "grandfather" of the present-day U.S. Air Force Medical Service.

Born, raised, and educated in Virginia, Grant received his M.D. from the University of Virginia in 1915. He entered the Army Medical Service in 1916 as a first lieutenant.

During World War I he served in Panama and various stations in the United States. From 1919 to 1922 he served with the Army of Occupation in Germany. After other medical tours of duty, he attended the School of Aviation Medicine Headquarters in 1931. He was stationed at Randolph Field, Texas, for the following five years. He later attended the Air Force Tactical School and the Chemical Warfare School. In 1939, he became chief of the Medical Division, Office of the Chief of the Air Corps.

Upon reorganization of the Army in 1941, he was appointed air surgeon of the Army Air Forces and visited all fronts during World War II.

Prior to World War II, Grant recognized that the medical needs of a combat air force differed significantly from those of massed land armies. He successfully fought for the establishment of a separate medical service for the Army Air Forces. He became the first Air Surgeon for the United States Army Air Forces and served in that capacity throughout World War II.

Grant was one of the first to recognize the potentialities of aeromedical evacuation and was directly responsible for its organization and operation in World War II. He was instrumental in the establishment of a convalescent rehabilitation program, which helped to restore many of the sick and wounded of World War II to maximum capacity for further service or return to civilian life.

His encouragement of aeromedical research resulted in the development of many items of modern high altitude equipment used for the protection of flying personnel. He supervised and directed the forerunner of our present aircrew selection and classification systems and is credited with the establishment of the Physiological Training Program.

After a thirty-three-year military career, Grant retired in 1946 and became medical director for the American Red Cross and national director of the Red Cross Blood Program. Grant was a recipient of the Distinguished Service Medal and held numerous military and civilian medical honors.

Grant died August 15, 1964. Nearly two years later, on July 1, 1966, the USAF (United States Air Force) Hospital at Travis Air Force Base, California, was officially renamed the David Grant USAF Medical Center during a dedication ceremony held in his honor.

== See also ==
- United States Air Force Medical Service
