= David Grant USAF Medical Center =

David Grant USAF Medical Center (DGMC)
- 60th Medical Group (60 MDG); Air Force Medical Service (AFMS); 60th Air Mobility Wing (60 AMW); Air Mobility Command (AMC)
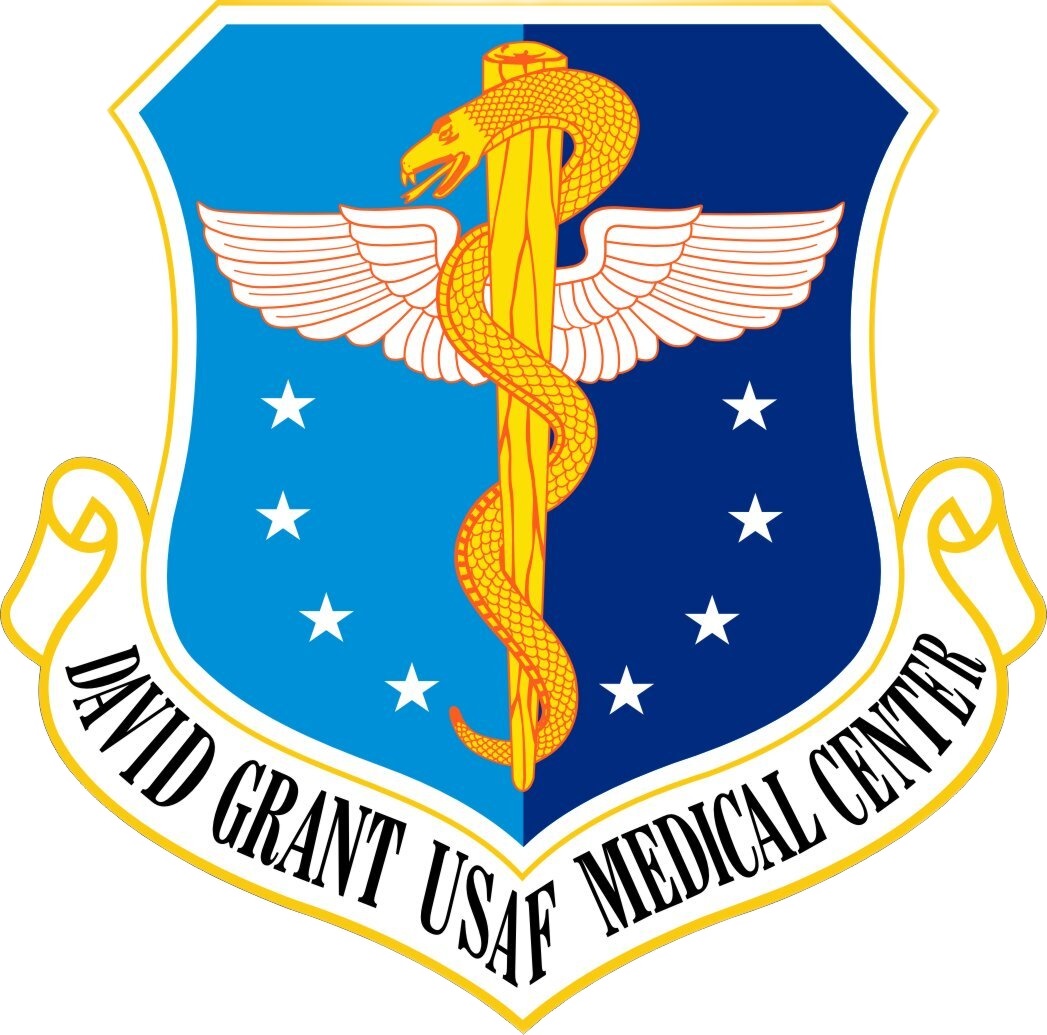

- David Grant USAF Medical Center

Geography
- Location: Travis AFB, Fairfield, California, United States
- Coordinates: 38.26966°N 121.96377°W

Organization
- Care system: United States Department of Defense Military Health System, TRICARE, Uniformed Services University of the Health Sciences, Veterans Administration Healthcare System, Private, Medicaid, Medicare
- Type: Teaching
- Affiliated university: Joint partnerships with University of California, Davis, Touro University California College of Osteopathic Medicine, University of the Pacific and Pacific Union College.

Services
- Standards: Air Force Medical Service, Joint Commission
- Emergency department: Level III trauma center
- Beds: 230
- Speciality: Anesthesiology, general surgery, family practice, diagnostic radiology, nuclear medicine, hyperbaric medicine, ob/gyn, mental health, hemodialysis, occupational/physical therapy, orthopedics, ophthalmology, optometry, ent, bioenviromental engineering, public health, oral & maxillofacial surgery, nutritional medicine, laboratory services, critical care (ICU and IMCU) neurosurgery, dentistry, pharmacy, nursing and health services administration

History
- Founded: July 1, 1943 (Third Generation facility opened Dec. 21, 1988)

Links
- Website: travis.tricare.mil
- Lists: Hospitals in California

The David Grant USAF Medical Center (DGMC) at Travis Air Force Base in Fairfield, California, is the United States Air Force's largest medical center in the continental United States and serves military beneficiaries throughout eight western states. It is a fully accredited hospital with a National Quality Approval gold seal by the Joint Commission, and serves more than 500,000 Department of Defense and Department of Veterans Affairs Northern California Health Care System eligible beneficiaries in the immediate San Francisco–Sacramento vicinity from 17 counties covering 40,000 square miles. Originally known as Travis Air Force Base Hospital, DGMC was renamed in 1966 in honor of David Norvell Walker Grant, the first Surgeon General of the United States Army Air Corps and United States Army Air Forces.

== History ==
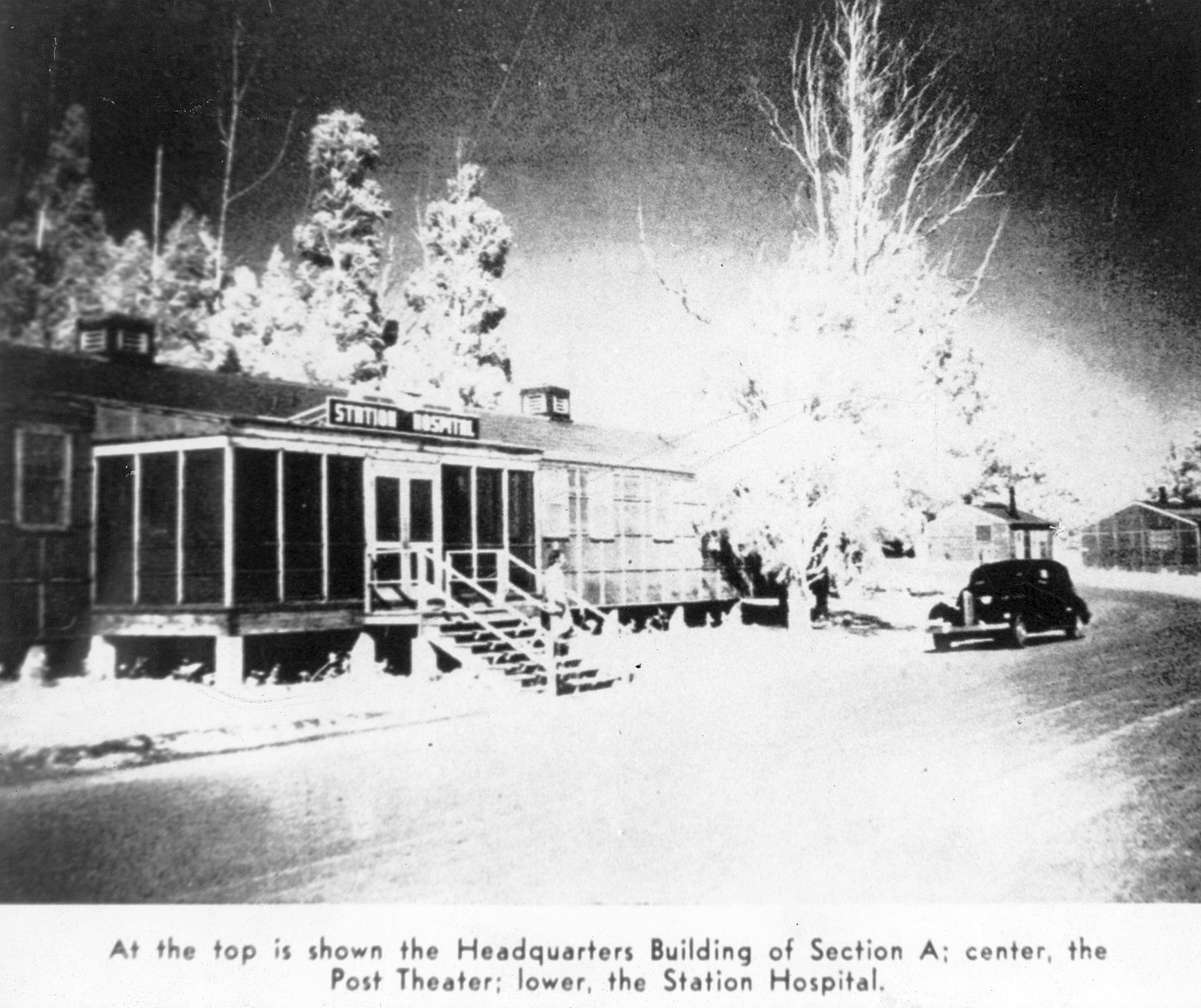
4167th Station Hospital at Fairfield-Suisun Army Air Field during WWII, circa 1943-1945

=== 1943–1949 ===
The medical center first opened its doors to patients on 1 July 1943 as the 4167th Station Hospital at Fairfield-Suisun Army Air Field. Hospital buildings were of cantonment-type construction, housing seven wards with a total capacity of 125 beds. Two wards were allocated for medical service, one for convalescent patients and one for a crash ward temporarily doubling as a redistribution point of supply. The remaining ward was used for examinations, briefings and medical clearance.

The first minor operation was performed in the hospital on 26 July 1943. Prior to this, all surgery was performed at Hamilton Field near San Francisco. The first major operation for acute appendicitis was successfully performed on 6 August 1943.

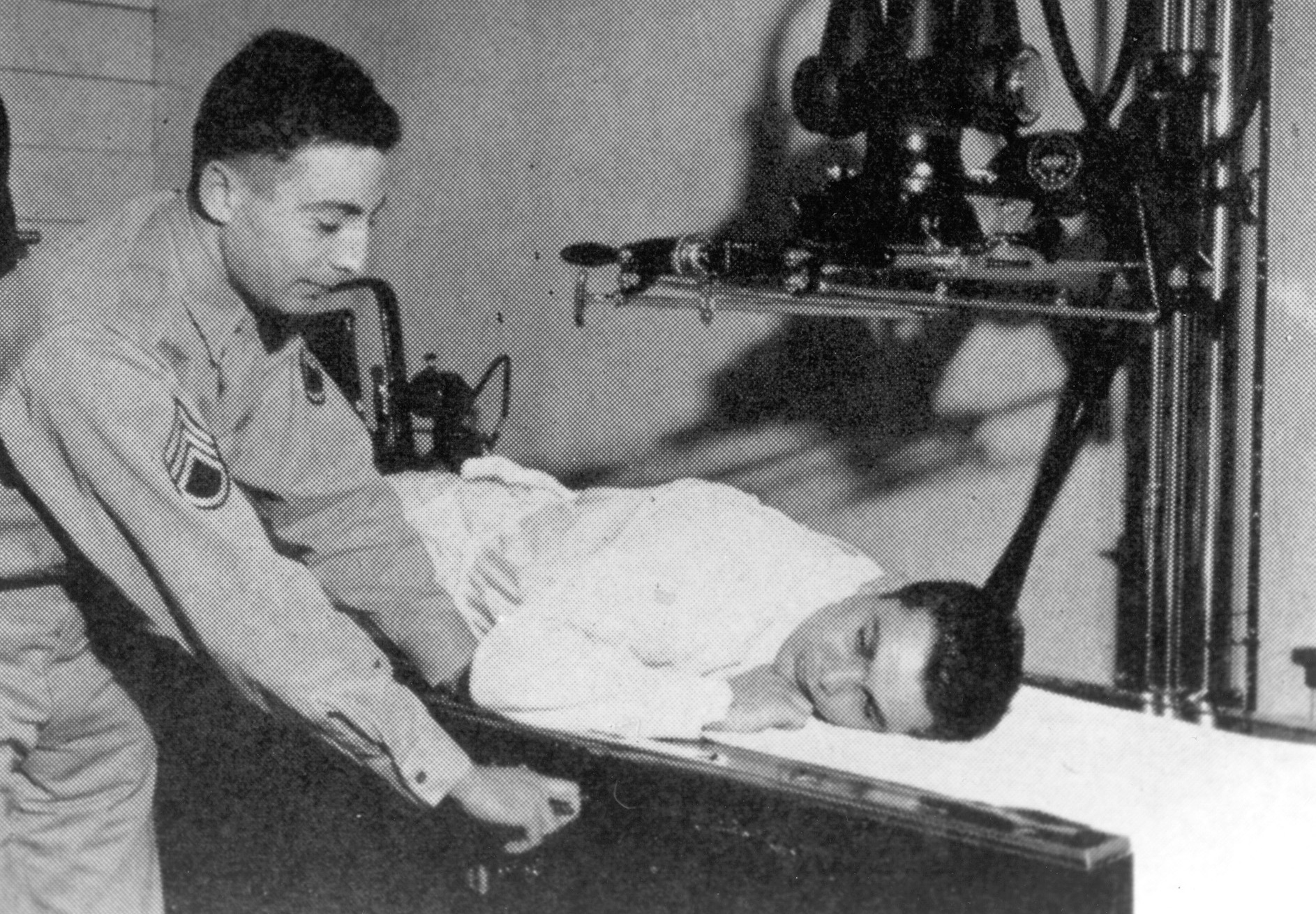
A U.S. Army Air Force Staff Sergeant Radiologic Technologist (Radiographer) positions a patient for an X-ray at the 4167th Station Hospital at Fairfield-Suisun Army Air Field during WWII, circa 1943-1945

In 1945 Congress approved the construction of a 670-bed Aerial Debarkation Hospital and the reconstruction of the 150-bed Station Hospital, and the project was immediately begun in June. The designs for the Aerial Debarkation Hospital called for seven wards, six of 100 beds. The seventh, for 70 beds, would be for mental health patients. The wards would accommodate eight patients in each room. A two-story Base Hospital would consist of four wards with a capacity of 150 beds.

After V-J Day, the primary mission of Fairfield-Suisun became the processing of returned troops for redeployment and transfer to separation centers. The mission of the AAF Station Hospital was to provide medical care for the station complement and transient personnel, and to perform routine examinations prior to the transfer to separation centers. With the cessation of hostilities with Japan, the construction of the holding station and hospital ceased. The floor of the tunnel and 80 percent of the footings had been poured. One long wall and several wing walls of concrete had been poured to first floor level and the area had been rough graded. Whatever work had been completed on the foundation was subsequently torn out.

The mission needs of Fairfield-Suisun Army Air Field had to be reevaluated as the west coast base from which the Air Transportation Command would conduct its foreign commitment. When this was completed in favor of maintaining the base, additional funds were allocated on 25 March 1946 to complete construction of projects at the base, among which was the hospital.

Excavation work for the 150-bed Station Hospital was started on 17 March 1947 after many revisions of plans. To allow the temporary hospital to continue its functions and, at the same time to clear the site for the new Air Freight Terminal and apron, a few of the existing hospital buildings were salvaged. Services continued in cramped quarters. The Stolte Incorporated had the contract for erecting the hospital building and Morrison-Knudsen Company, Inc., handled the landscaping and roads around the hospital.

As the transition to separate the Air Force from the U.S. Army began in 1947, all Station Hospital personnel were assigned to the newly designated 8th Medical Group (provisional). It consisted of two squadrons: the 81st Medical Squadron (provisional), composed of all medical department duty personnel, and the 82nd Medical Squadron (provisional), composed entirely of hospital patients.

On 1 Jun 1948 at the recently redesignated Fairfield Suisun AFB, the 8th Medical Group was redesignated 530th Medical Services Squadron, 530th Air Transport Wing. Just a few months later on 1 Oct 1948, the 530th Medical Services Squadron was redesignated 1501st Medical Services Squadron.

On 2 May 1949, the Strategic Air Command (SAC) took over the jurisdiction of Fairfield-Suisun AFB, with the 9th Strategic Reconnaissance Wing activated. One of its components was the 9th Medical Group, whose mission was to run the hospital. In addition to providing the usual care for base and attached personnel, the hospital serviced personnel passing through the separation center and took care of air evacuation patients.

On 20 May 1949, the hospital moved into its new permanent installation, known to the locals as "The Hospital on the Hill." A total of 148 people were assigned: 24 officers, 10 nurses, 72 enlisted men, and 42 civilian personnel.

On 5 Nov 1949, the 5th Strategic Reconnaissance Wing was attached to the 9th Wing. The hospital functioned under two medical groups: the 9th and the 5th—but was under the command jurisdiction of the 9th.

=== 1950–1959 ===
A Physical Evaluation Board was established on 1 June 1950, and the hospital was designated as a center for Air Force patients requiring general surgical and medical care. As the only aerial debarkation hospital on the west coast, the facility was modified during the 1950s as the newly renamed Travis AFB. As a result of the Korean War, all patients evacuated by air from Pacific bases debarked at Travis. Facilities had to be expanded to meet new needs. In August 1950, the hospital airmen's barracks were converted into a hospital annex, with 118 additional beds. The total number of patients evacuated by air during the month was 1304, in comparison to 514 for the previous month. Just four months later in December 1950, the hospital reached a peak of 5,475 patients received by air evacuation.

When the 9th Bombardment Wing, including the 9th Medical Group, moved from Travis AFB to Mountain Home AFB, Idaho on 1 May 1953, the 5th Medical Group took over the hospital at Travis.

After the Armistice in Korea became effective, the first group of American prisoners of war, from the mass exchange of prisoners with the Communists, arrived at Travis on 12 August 1953. On 12 Feb 1954, the 5th Medical Group was inactivated. The 5th Tactical Hospital and the 4167th USAF Hospital were activated and both assigned to the 5th Strategic Reconnaissance Wing. Their mission to staff the hospital remained unchanged until 1 Apr 1954, when the 4167th was relieved from assignment to the 5th Wing and reassigned directly to the 14th Air Division (5th Air Base Group, 14th Air Division, Fifteenth Air Force, Strategic Air Command).

On 30 Jun 1954, the first planeload from war in Indo-China, consisting of 16 litters and 31 ambulatory French patients, arrived at the Travis hospital. The French Naval attaché of the West Coast, the manager of the French newspaper, and the French consul general visited the French patients.

On 1 July 1958, the Military Air Transport Service (MATS) resumed command of Travis AFB from Strategic Air Command (later redesignated as Military Airlift Command on 1 January 1966).

=== 1960–1969 ===
Major General (Dr.) David N.W. Grant, MC, USAAF First Air Surgeon, U.S. Army Air Forces -- the "Father" of the U.S. Air Force Medical Service

Additional construction to USAF Hospital Travis was completed in 1961, which included conversion of the former nurses’ quarters to a casualty staging facility. Temporary conversion of a transient airmen's dormitory in 1965 enabled the hospital to reach 650 beds. With the growing conflict in Southeast Asia after the Gulf of Tonkin incident in 1965, USAF Hospital Travis became the central receiving medical facility for aeromedical evacuation of soldiers, sailors, marines and airmen wounded during the Vietnam War.

On 1 July 1966, the USAF Hospital at Travis AFB was designated David Grant USAF Medical Center in honor of the late Major General (Dr.) David Norvell Walker Grant, USAAF, MC (1891–1964), the first Surgeon General of the Army Air Corps and U.S. Army Air Forces. The medical center was a wing-equivalent as well as a tenant on Travis AFB.

Postgraduate educational programs were implemented at DGMC in 1966 when planning began for five residency programs. The Air Force and Medical Service Accreditation Committee for Graduate Medical Education gave provisional approval to start the general surgery, pediatrics, obstetrical/gynecological, internal medicine, and radiology residency programs with a start date of 1 July 1967. Other programs offered at DGMC included physician assistant in orthopedics, pharmacy practice, nurse anesthesia, and administrative residency.

Residency programs with the local communities: In addition to training active duty officers, DGMC partners with the local community and reserve forces to provide training. DGMC has active affiliations with UC Davis School of Medicine, UC San Francisco, University of the Pacific, Solano Community College and a number of the other local training institutions. General Dentistry and Oral and Maxillofacial Surgery postgraduate education programs were added in 1969.

On 1 July 1969, USAF implemented a new medical system dividing CONUS into six geographical areas, each composed of one large AF medical facility designated as a Medical Center and smaller referral hospitals designated regional hospitals. DGMC became the Medical Center for 24 other active AF installations, including three regional hospitals in a nine-state area. DGMC also received referral patients from the Pacific area and cared for transient patients at the Second Aeromedical Staging Flight, an assigned unit.

=== 1970–1979 ===
In 1978, the family practice postgraduate educational program and transitional year residency programs were initiated. It has long been one of the premier family practice residency programs in the Air Force and the nation. Today the accredited program trains 42 residents a year (14-14-14) in a variety of inpatient and outpatient settings. Residents train both in the Family Practice Clinic and on other specialty rotations, as well as other designated training sites. Consultation services are available with board certified individuals in all departments. In the first year of training, the program emphasizes inpatient management of medical problems, largely through rotations on a variety of specialty services. In the second year, inpatient skills are refined and greater exposure to outpatient clinics is provided. During the third year, the emphasis is within the model family practice unit, integrating acquired knowledge into the total primary health care of families.

The transitional internship at DGMC is a 12-month program with four interns selected per year from a large group of applicants for a flexible and broad clinical experience. It is fully accredited by the Accreditation Council for Graduate Medical Education (ACGME). The transitional internship is designed to fulfill the educational goals of medical school graduates.

=== 1980–1989 ===
On 21 October 1988, the medical center moved from “the Hospital on the Hill” to its current location, a state-of-the-art, modern medical center, located on the northwest portion of the base with a separate gate entrance. The former “Hospital on the Hill” is now known as Building 381, home to the Fifteenth Air Force Headquarters and the 60th Mission Support Squadron.

=== 1990–1999 ===
In late 1989, DGMC saw the opening of a Hyperbaric Medicine department. One of the largest clinical hyperbaric chambers in North America, it can hold 18 patients and three inside observers in the main chamber, and up to five patients in either of the other two chambers respectively. Constantly staffed, maintained and fully operational 24 hours a day, seven days a week and 365 days a year basis since 1990, it cost approximately $12 million to build.

In 1991, the medical center deployed 750 physicians, dentists, nurses, MSCs, BSCs, and enlisted personnel to Nocton Hall, England to activate the 310th Contingency Hospital to receive casualties during Operation DESERT STORM.

Headquarters, Military Airlift Command redesignates the wing as the 60th Airlift Wing on 1 Nov 1991. Just seven months later on 1 Jun 1992, Military Airlift Command (MAC) becomes Air Mobility Command (AMC)

1992-1993 saw many humanitarian operations supported by the 60th AMW, including Operation Provide Comfort in Iraq, Operation Provide Hope in the former Soviet Union, Operation Provide Promise in Bosnia, and Operation Provide Relief and Operation Restore Hope in Somalia.

In January 1994, the Travis Fisher House open its doors and has to date served over 2,800 guests. Co-located on the grounds of DGMC within a short walking distance, this 5,000-square-foot (460 m^{2}) house has two single bedrooms, three double rooms, and two double room suites. It accommodates up to seven families or 16 people at a time. The average occupancy rate during 2007 was 91% on a first-come, first-served basis for those meeting the eligibility criteria. The only primary criterion is a need to provide a family environment close to the patient.

The Fisher House Foundation provides humanitarian support to members United States Armed Forces and their families.

July-Sept 1994—Operation Support Hope: Rwanda, multinational relief effort

On 1 July 1994 the medical center was re-designated the David Grant Medical Center, dropping the “USAF” reference. AMC redesignated the 60th Airlift Wing as 60th Air Mobility Wing, while the 60th Medical Group came into existence on 1 Oct 1994. Four new squadrons were then activated under the 60th Medical Group: 60th Aerospace Medicine Squadron (60 AMDS), 60th Dental Squadron (60 DS), 60th Medical Operations Squadron (60 MDOS) and 60th Medical Support Squadron (60 MDSS).

On 15 Sept 1994, the Department of Veterans Affairs (VA) and the United States Air Force signed a construction permit reflecting an interagency agreement to allow the VA to build a VA outpatient clinic as an addition to David Grant Medical Center. The combined facility would be a joint venture to be operated by both VA and the Air Force in what will be one of the more fully integrated medical sharing arrangements between federal departments. The project would result in considerable cost savings through the sharing of resources and joint operation of the facility.

Sept 1994—Operation Phoenix Shark: U.S. response to Haitian power struggle

Oct 1994—Operation Restore Democracy: Haiti and Operation Phoenix Jackal: Saudi Arabia, Kuwait (Iraq military advances on Kuwait border)

Late 1994—Operations Panama/Phoenix/Safe Haven (repatriation of Cuban refugees in Panama)

From February 1995 to August 1995, 145 members of the 60th Medical Group deployed to Zagreb, Croatia in support of the United Nations peacekeeping mission in the former Yugoslavia. The 60th Medical Group Forward at Camp Pleso provided comprehensive medical and surgical care to U.N. members from dozens of countries. The medical center has also deployed individual members throughout the world to support military and humanitarian efforts of the Air Force.

21 Jan 1995—Operation Phoenix Onyx: Spain (redeployment of troops out of Somalia)

10 Feb 1995—Bosnia-Croatia war: Members of the 60th Medical Group deployed to Zagreb, Croatia, for six months and served as the UN hospital team in that war-torn region.

Medical technicians assigned to the 60th Aerospace Medicine Squadron received notification on 31 Mar 1995 that the unit's flight physical team earned highest honors in the Rochester Institute of Technology and USA Today Quality Cup Award competition. This marked the first time a military organization earned the top honor in any of the competition's six categories.

5 Dec 1995—Operation Joint Endeavor/Phoenix Moat: Bosnia-Herzegovina (a NATO peace mission in the Balkans)

Effective 1 Oct 1999, the “USAF” moniker was reinstituted back into the current name of David Grant USAF Medical Center.

=== 2000–present ===
David Grant USAF Medical Center

In February 2000, the medical "campus" grew in size as a new Veterans Administration Outpatient Clinic opened for business. It was to augment services lost at the VA Martinez Medical Center as a result of the 1989 Loma Prieta earthquake. Simplicity and structural expression characterize the architecture of the VA Northern California Health Care System's (VANCHCS) Fairfield Outpatient Clinic at Travis Air Force Base; it provides health services to veterans in Northern California. Located next to DGMC, the clinic complements services provided at other Department of Veterans Affairs facilities in the San Francisco and Sacramento Valley region.

The single-story, 38,000-square-foot (3,500 m^{2}) structure blends icons of aviation into three volumes of space, resulting in clear wayfinding between the central lobby and the clinical and ancillary wings. The design provides an easily accessible central lobby with well-defined circulation and naturally lit, acoustically softened waiting areas. Exterior massing evokes aeronautic imagery while screening public spaces from the sun. Inside, exposed steel bracing reflects the form of lightweight aircraft, while simultaneously framing directional signage to key primary and ancillary care services.

Planning concepts express the building's structural system, while preserving functional flexibility. Clinical spaces are grouped as flexible modules to allow changes of use without changes in construction. For example, administrative departments can be easily converted to exam and treatment space and, similarly, individual offices can easily convert to clinical treatment rooms.

The building footprint consists of three distinct zones: an open entrance lobby; a modular clinical block, which anticipates future conversion from primary care to specialty use; and an ancillary support block, which allows for future conversion to soft space for enhanced diagnostic and treatment functions. A lobby with a clerestory links interior and exterior spaces through a gradual progression of inviting materials and finishes.

The VA Fairfield Outpatient Clinic offers a wide range of services including primary care, hemodialysis, laboratory, mental health, neurology, neurosurgery, nutrition counseling, otolaryngology (ENT), pharmacy, and physical therapy. Radiology, radiation therapy, emergency and inpatient care are available at DGMC through a unique VA/DOD Sharing Agreement.

DGMC currently operates the second-largest readiness platform in the Air Force Medical Service and largest in Air Mobility Command, with over 1,000 of 2,000 60th Medical Group personnel assigned to mobility positions. DGMC is routinely called upon to support sustainment and surge operations, providing medical capability throughout the world. Hospital personnel continue to deploy in support of contingency and humanitarian missions.

On 25 Jan 2002 DGMC opened the $1.5 million Warfighter Photorefractive keratectomy Center (PRK), one of only five in the Air Force Medical Service. The center includes an upgraded $50,000 laser-eye treatment system.

Work began in January 2003 on four new labor and delivery suites in the OB ward.

“Gulf War II” began in March and June 2003. More than 200 60th Medical Group personnel deployed to Middle East, Southwest Asia and other worldwide locations at any given time.

In 2004, the Air Force decided to expand the Family Medicine Residency Program and to close the Obstetrics & Gynecology, Internal Medicine and Pediatrics Residency programs, effective 30 June 2006. In addition, the General Surgery Residency Program merged with the University of California Davis program effective 1 July 2006. In 2008, the Air Force Surgeon General approved a plan to train Air Force Internal Medicine Residents in an innovative program conducted at University of California Davis, with a military track at DGMC. This new program, benefitting both the future Air Force mission and current patient population, was initiated in July 2009.

==== Medical incident ====
On July 9, 2009, a serious medical incident occurred at DGMC. According to various published media reports, a resident physician operating under the supervision of a staff surgeon punctured the aorta of an active duty patient, Colton Read, during a laparoscopic gallbladder surgical procedure. In an effort to repair the aorta quickly enough to save Read's life, the surgeon sutured his aorta shut, cutting off all blood flow to his legs. The patient was eventually transferred to UC Davis Medical Center, but not in time for a cardiovascular surgeon to save his legs which had to be amputated.

Medical centers and the Air Force immediately investigate any major incident at a military treatment facility (MTF). The Joint Commission, DGMC's accrediting organization, was notified of the incident, and multiple medical investigations — both internal and external — were immediately initiated. These investigations are designed to not only prevent incident recurrence and improve the safety and quality of healthcare at the facility in question, but also throughout the medical profession. To encourage candor from witnesses, the information gained is confidential. A command-directed investigation by Air Force officials was completed in March 2010; it recommended no formal criminal action against the doctors involved in the surgery. No decisions regarding medical separation or retirement will be made until the patient in question is through the recovery and rehabilitation phase of his treatment.

== DGMC in the 21st century ==
DGMC is the largest inpatient military treatment facility in Air Mobility Command and the second largest in the United States Air Force, providing a full spectrum of care to a prime service area population of nearly 106,000 TRICARE beneficiaries in the immediate San Francisco-Sacramento vicinity and 500,000 in the Department of Veterans Affairs Northern California Health Care System. It operates with an annual budget of $315 million and is staffed by more than 2,500 personnel, which includes 646 active duty officers, 933 enlisted personnel, 70 Individual Mobilization Augmentee reservists, 311 civil service civilians, 270 contractors, 100 Veterans Affairs personnel, 70 American Red Cross workers and 200 highly dedicated military retiree volunteers.

Based on Fiscal Year 2013 data, total patient encounters numbered more than 1.7 million. An "average day" at DGMC consists of more than 1,586 outpatient visits, 61 Emergency Room (ER) visits, 13 ER admissions, 156 dental appointments, 2,230 prescriptions filled, two babies delivered, 1,655 meals served, 550 radiographs (X-rays) taken, 20 patients admitted, nine hyperbaric treatments, 55 unique surgical procedures, 16 operations, 65 daily inpatients and 1,903 lab tests conducted. DGMC is also one of two inpatient mental health AFMS facilities and has a modern 12-bed medical/surgical intensive care unit.

The present medical center opened its doors on 19 December 1988 at a cost of $193 million, through a design-build contract. The project was completed ahead of schedule and $8 million below original budget projections. DGMC is divided into three separate patient zones: inpatient nursing units, diagnostic and treatment areas, and outpatient clinics, placed around five large courtyards.

DGMC encompasses 808,475 net square feet with 3,662 rooms. It is staffed to operate 84 inpatient beds (expandable to 176), 16 aeromedical staging facility beds (expandable to 40) and 52 dental treatment rooms in the adjacent Arthur J. Sachsel Dental Clinic. The “footprint” measures greater than two football fields in width and almost four football fields in length. It received five national awards for design and construction. Built to withstand major earthquakes, it can operate for up to a week using integral utility capabilities. Additionally, integral structural components and foundations are sized for future vertical expansion.

DGMC has supported many operations in the 21st century. Medics from DGMC have served in the Afghanistan war, Iraq war, Syrian civil war, and various counterterrorism operations throughout the world.

In 2021, DGMC deployed 87 medics in support of Operation Allies Refuge within 24 hours notification. Members of DGMC were the last remaining medics at Bagram AB military treatment facility. 13 medics were in country during the collapse of Afghanistan and retreated to Hamid Karzi International Airport. The medics of DGMC played a vital lifesaving role in the Afghan withdrawal. The humanitarian non-combatant evacuation operation became the largest airlift in U.S. Air Force history resulting in 123 thousand Afghans evacuated.

== Key highlights ==
=== Aeromedical Staging Facility ===
The Aeromedical Staging Facility is one of only three in the United States; it provides care on a worldwide basis for Wounded Warriors traveling in the aeromedical evacuation system. It is the sole Air Force-bedded ASF on the west coast, serving as the “jumping off” point for the Pacific theater. From FY05 to date, over 3,600 patients from Operations IRAQI FREEDOM and ENDURING FREEDOM have passed through the ASF. The monthly average is 30 patients; more than 40 Veterans Affairs patients have transferred to VA Palo Alto for treatment.

=== Graduate Medical Education ===
DGMC operates the second-largest Graduate Medical Education program in the Air Force, consisting of seven Medical, two Dental, and six Allied Health Sciences, with 131 residents per year. A certified registered nurse anesthetist class, in conjunction with the U.S. Army's Graduate Program in Anesthesia Nursing at Ft. Sam Houston / Baylor College, is ranked number one out of 112 programs in the United States. DGMC's Family Medicine program, with 42 residents in surgical, radiological, and transitional courses, is the largest in the Air Force. The General Surgery, Vascular Surgery, Emergency Medicine and Internal Medicine Residency programs treat civilian and military patients in partnership with the University of California at Davis. Diagnostic Radiology, Transitional Year, Advanced Education in General Dentistry, Oral & Maxillofacial Surgery, Pharmacy Practice, Physician Assistants, Orthopedic Physician Assistant Fellowship, Mental Health and Social Work Residency programs round out the suite of GME programs. Additionally, DGMC offers six Phase II training programs for enlisted medical technicians and four Nurse Transition Program for 310 students annually.

=== VA/DoD Sharing – Joint Incentive Fund ===
DGMC has become a specialty care referral hub for Northern California Veterans Health Administration patients with inpatient/outpatient care and facility sharing agreements. VA/DoD Joint Venture programs include the $1.6 million Hemodialysis unit. A $5.5 million Joint Spine and Neurosurgery service was added in 2007. A $5.9 million Joint Inpatient Mental Health Unit and a $5.7 million Joint Radiation Oncology Center were upgraded to state-of-the-art services in 2009. Meanwhile, a $4.4 million robotically assisted Cardiovascular Operating Room (CVOR) -- one of only five in the nation—opened in October 2010 as part of a Heart, Lung and Cardiovascular Care Center. Additionally, DGMC provides Hyperbaric Medicine support for VA San Francisco and VA Palo Alto Medical Centers.

=== Readiness Platform ===
DGMC personnel have performed expeditionary medical missions for both combat support and humanitarian missions, ranging from Iraq, Afghanistan and the Indonesian tsunami to Hurricane Rita and California wildfire relief efforts stateside. DGMC also fulfills a key role in the National Response Plan as the Sacramento-region Federal Coordinating Center for the National Disaster Medical System.

As one of the USAF Constant Deployer Model sites, DGMC has over 730 mobility positions in 45 different standard Unit Type Codes filled by 150 different Air Force Specialty Codes. The current steady state has approximately 150 medical personnel deployed in support of Aerospace Expeditionary Force rotations and humanitarian missions (such as the Indonesian Tsunami and Hurricane Rita relief efforts.

DGMC also fulfills a key role in the National Response Plan as the Sacramento region Federal Coordinating Center for the National Disaster Medical System.

=== Medical Research ===
DGMC operates one of six Air Force Clinical Investigation Facilities, working on medical innovation to improve care for the warfighter and the nation. Summaries from the DGMC research focus on critical care, trauma resuscitation, long-term health after combat and the cardiac effects of energy drinks are posted for viewing by the Air Force Medical Service. DGMC's medical research has been widely publicized for advances in understanding how combat injury leads to disease later in life and for insight into the cardiac effects of caffeinated energy beverage consumption as well as leading to the development of numerous patents.

=== Available services ===
- Addiction care (outpatient)
- Alcohol & drug rehabilitation (outpatient)
- Allergy (outpatient)
- Audiology (outpatient)
- Behavioral health (non 24-hour care – adult/child/youth) (24-hour acute care/crisis stabilization – adult)
- Bone marrow transplant (inpatient)
- Cancer center/oncology (inpatient, outpatient)
- Cardiac catheterization lab (inpatient, outpatient)
- Cardiac unit/cardiology (inpatient, outpatient)
- Chemical dependency (non 24-hour care – adult)
- CT scanner (inpatient, outpatient)
- Dentistry (inpatient, outpatient)
- Dermatology (inpatient, outpatient)
- Dialysis (inpatient, outpatient)
- EEG/EKG/EMG lab (inpatient, outpatient)
- Emergency room (outpatient)
- Endocrinology (inpatient, outpatient)
- Family practice (inpatient, outpatient)
- Gastroenterology (inpatient, outpatient)
- General medical services (inpatient, outpatient)
- General surgery (inpatient, outpatient)
- Gastro intestinal or endoscopy lab (inpatient, outpatient)
- Gynecology (inpatient, outpatient)
- Hematology/blood treatment (inpatient, outpatient)
- Imaging/radiology (inpatient, outpatient)
- Infectious diseases (inpatient, outpatient)
- Infusion services (inpatient, outpatient)
- inpatient intake (inpatient)
- Intensive care unit (inpatient)
- Internal medicine (inpatient, outpatient)
- Labor and delivery (inpatient)
- Magnetic resonance imaging (inpatient, outpatient)
- Medical detoxification (inpatient)
- Mental health (inpatient, outpatient, 24-hour acute care/crisis stabilization)
- Nephrology (inpatient, outpatient)
- Neurology (inpatient, outpatient)
- Neurosurgery (inpatient)
- Nuclear medicine (inpatient, outpatient)
- Nursery (inpatient)
- Obstetrics (inpatient, outpatient)
- Occupational health (outpatient)
- Operating room (inpatient, outpatient)
- Ophthalmology/eye surgery (inpatient, outpatient)
- Oral and maxillofacial surgery (inpatient, outpatient)
- Orthopedic surgery (inpatient, outpatient)
- Otolaryngology/ear, nose, and throat (inpatient, outpatient)
- outpatient surgery (outpatient)
- Pediatric care (inpatient, outpatient)
- Plastic surgery (inpatient, outpatient)
- Podiatry (inpatient, outpatient)
- Post anesthesia care unit (PACU) (inpatient, outpatient)
- Pulmonary function Lab (inpatient, outpatient)
- Radiation oncology (inpatient, outpatient)
- Respiratory care (Ventilator) (inpatient)
- Rheumatology (inpatient, outpatient)
- Sleep center (outpatient)
- Telemetry (inpatient)
- Thoracic surgery (inpatient, outpatient)
- Ultrasound (inpatient, outpatient)
- Urgent care/emergency medicine (outpatient)
- Urology (inpatient, outpatient)
- Vascular surgery (inpatient, outpatient)
- Wound care (inpatient, outpatient)

== See also ==
- Air Force Medical Badge
- TRICARE
