= Operation Golden Phoenix =

Annual preparedness exercise in California

Operation Golden Phoenix (alternatively called Exercise Golden Phoenix) is an annual preparedness exercise conducted in the southern California area which includes participation of civil, military and volunteer organizations. Established in 2006, the exercise has included drills for future earthquakes and terrorist attacks.

In 2010, the operation was coordinated by Los Angeles County.

In 2023, the exercise was hosted by Travis Air Force Base

The exercises have focused on improving the coordination of local organizations through building personal relationships and improving communications.
