= Strategic Communications Wing One =

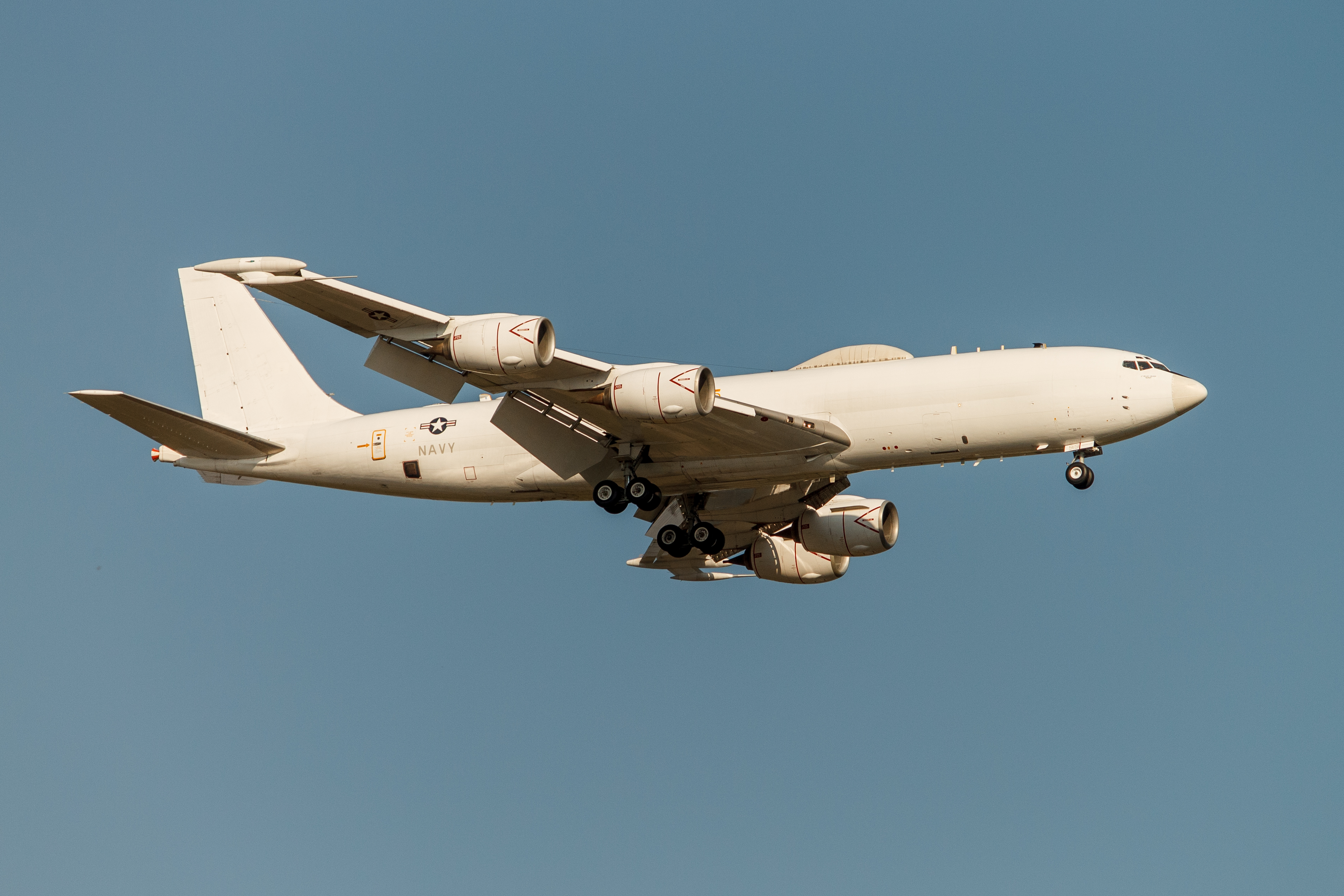
- One of the wing's E-6B Mercurys on approach to Tinker Air Force Base in 2014
- Active: 29 May 1992 – present (33 years, 6 months)
- Country: United States
- Branch: United States Navy
- Part of: Naval Air Force, Pacific
- Garrison/HQ: Tinker Air Force Base, Oklahoma

Insignia
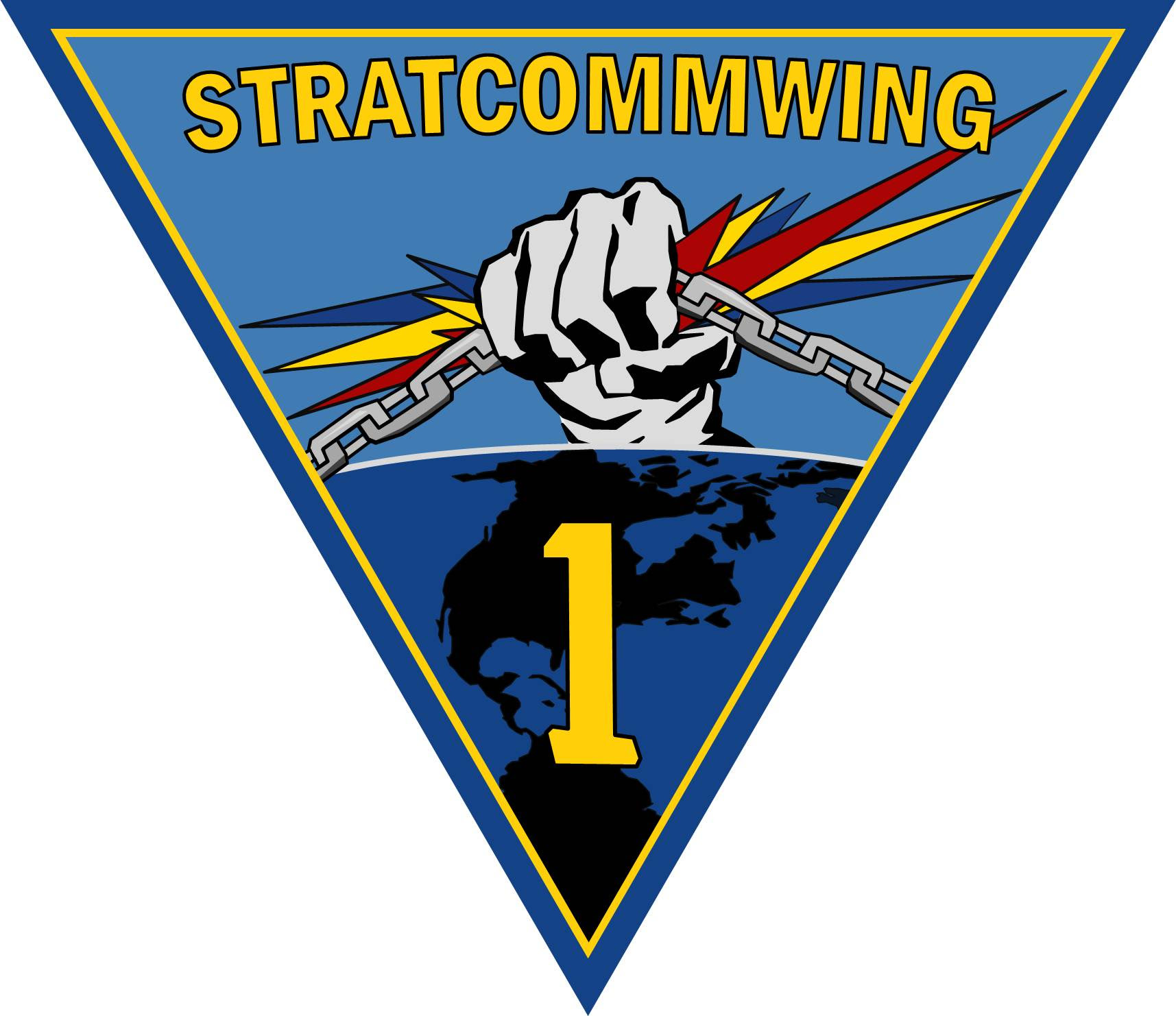
- Strategic Communications Wing One emblem

Aircraft flown
- E-6B Mercury

Strategic Communications Wing 1 (STRATCOMWING ONE) is a nuclear command and control wing of the United States Navy, located at Tinker Air Force Base, Oklahoma. Its TACAMO ("Take Charge and Move Out") mission provides airborne communications links to nuclear missile units of United States Strategic Command.

The wing was formally established on 29 May 1992, and the two operational squadrons, VQ-3 and VQ-4 moved from their former Atlantic and Pacific bases in 1992 and 1993. Captain Andy Riddile, first commander ("Commodore") of the wing, arrived in April 1992. A separate Fleet Replacement Squadron (FRS), VQ-7, was later established at Tinker AFB with EC-18 and TC-18 aircraft.

The wing consists of three squadrons and a wing staff, and employs over 1,300 active-duty sailors and 100 contractors to provide maintenance, security, operations, administration, training and logistic support for the E-6 Mercury aircraft fleet. The E-6B Mercury enables the President of the United States and the Secretary of Defense to directly contact submarines, bombers and missile silos enforcing the country's national security through nuclear deterrence.

The Wing provides a secure communications link designed to for use in the event of nuclear war or other major incident in order to maintain communications between the decision-makers comprising the National Command Authority (NCA) and the triad of U.S. strategic nuclear weapon delivery systems, crewed bombers, land-based intercontinental ballistic missiles (ICBMs) and submarine-launched ballistic missiles (SLBMs).

The wing's primary mission is to receive, verify and retransmit Emergency Action Messages (EAMs) to US strategic forces. With the retirement of the USAF EC-135 Looking Glass airframe, the E-6 Mercury upgraded with the Airborne Launch Control System (ALCS) have also assumed the airborne command post mission for the United States Strategic Command (USSTRATCOM). OC-ALC airframe artisans perform depot work on the Navy's E-6 Mercury aircraft, which are based on the Boeing 707 airframe. The wing's Navy sailors perform organizational and field level maintenance work, with the former integrated at the flying squadron level while the latter is performed at the wing's aircraft intermediate maintenance department (AIMD) level. The wing also operates alert facilities for E-6B aircraft at Travis AFB, California and Naval Air Station Patuxent River, Maryland.

STRATCOMWING ONE's subordinate squadrons include:

- Fleet Air Reconnaissance Squadron THREE (VQ-3) (E-6B)
- Fleet Air Reconnaissance Squadron FOUR (VQ-4) (E-6B)
- Fleet Air Reconnaissance Squadron SEVEN (VQ-7)

Previous Commanders:

Retired Rear Admiral Margaret D. Klein who served under Defense Secretary Chuck Hagel.

Captain Heather Cole, who was removed from command in early 2015 in connection to reported "cultural issues."
