= Travis Air Force Base =

US Air Force base near Fairfield, California, United States

- Near Fairfield, California in the United States of America
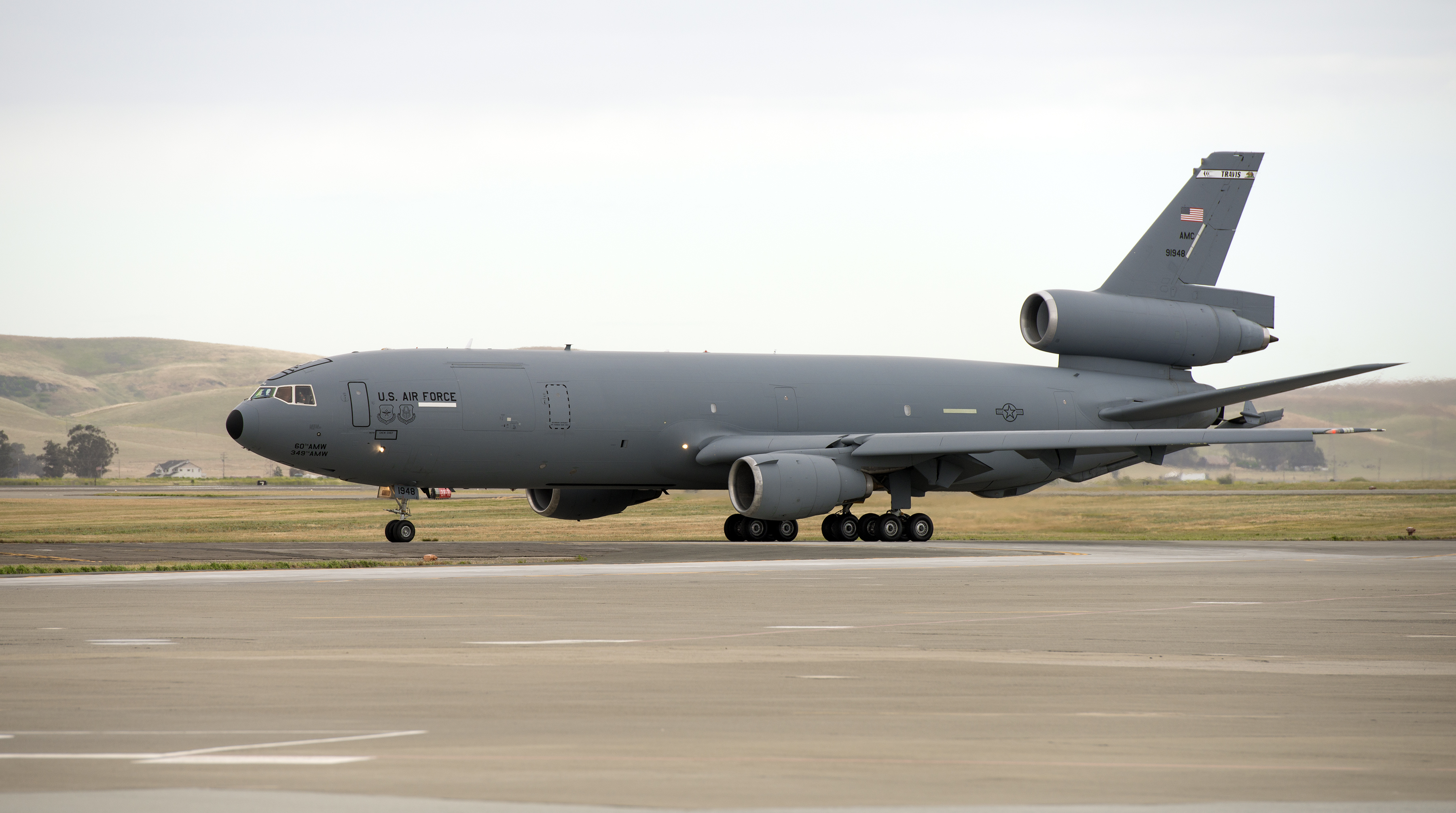
- A McDonnell Douglas KC-10A Extender of the 60th Air Mobility Wing at Travis Air Force Base during 2015

Site information
- Type: US Air Force Base
- Owner: Department of Defense
- Operator: US Air Force
- Controlled by: Air Mobility Command (AMC)
- Condition: operational
- Website: www.travis.af.mil

Location
- Location within California Location within the United States Location within North America
- Coordinates: 38°15′46″N 121°55′39″W

Site history
- Built: 1942 (as Fairfield-Suisun Army Air Base)
- In use: since 1942

Garrison information
- Current commander: Colonel Derek M. Salmi
- Garrison: 60th Air Mobility Wing (host); 349th Air Mobility Wing; 621st Contingency Response Wing

Airfield information
- Identifiers: IATA: SUU, ICAO: KSUU, FAA LID: SUU, WMO: 745160
- Elevation: 19.2 metres (63 ft) AMSL
Runways
| Direction | Length and surface |
|---|---|
| 3L/21R | 3,353.1 metres (11,001 ft) Porus European Mix |
| 3R/21L | 3,351.2 metres (10,995 ft) Concrete |
| 32/212; Assault Strip | 1,066.8 metres (3,500 ft) Concrete |

Travis Air Force Base (IATA: SUU, ICAO: KSUU, FAA LID: SUU) is a United States Air Force base under the operational control of Air Mobility Command (AMC), located three miles (5 km) east of the central business district of the city of Fairfield, in Solano County, California.

Situated at the southwestern edge of the Sacramento Valley and known as the "Gateway to the Pacific," Travis Air Force Base handles more cargo and passenger traffic through its airport than any other military air terminal in the United States. The base has a long history of supporting humanitarian airlift operations at home and around the world. As of September 2009, Travis AFB included approximately 7,390 active USAF military personnel, 3,260 Air Force Reserve personnel and 3,690 civilians.

Travis AFB has a major impact on the community as a number of military families and retirees have chosen to make Fairfield their permanent home. It is the largest employer in the city and Solano County as well, and the massive Travis workforce has a local economic impact of more than $1 billion annually. The base also contributes many highly skilled people to the local labor pool.

The base's host unit, the 60th Air Mobility Wing, is the largest wing in the Air Force's Air Mobility Command, with a versatile fleet of 26 C-5 Galaxies, 24 KC-46 Pegasus, and 13 C-17 Globemaster III aircraft.

The base's former Strategic Air Command Alert Facility is a U.S. Navy complex that typically supports two transient Navy E-6B Mercury TACAMO aircraft assigned to Fleet Air Reconnaissance Squadron THREE (VQ-3) Detachment and normally home-based at Tinker AFB, Oklahoma.

The base is also host to the David Grant USAF Medical Center, a 265-bed, $200 million Air Force teaching hospital, which serves both in-service and retired military personnel.

== History ==
Originally named Fairfield–Suisun Army Air Base, construction began on Travis in 1942. Originally, medium attack bombers were supposed to be stationed at the base. The United States Navy had aircraft at the base for training, but this proved temporary. In October 1942, the War Department assigned the base to the Air Transport Command. The base's primary mission during World War II was ferrying aircraft and supplies to the Pacific Theater.

Following the end of World War II and the establishment of the U.S. Air Force as a separate service in 1947, the installation was renamed Fairfield–Suisun Air Force Base.

On 1 May 1949, the Strategic Air Command (SAC) became the parent major command for Travis AFB, turning it into a major long-range reconnaissance and intercontinental bombing installation for the 9th Bomb Group/9th Bomb Wing. For the next nine years, airlift operations became secondary while Travis served as home for SAC bombers such as the B-29 Superfortress, B-36 Peacemaker, and eventually, the B-52 Stratofortress. During this period, new hangars appeared, runways were added and widened, and permanent barracks and family living quarters were built.

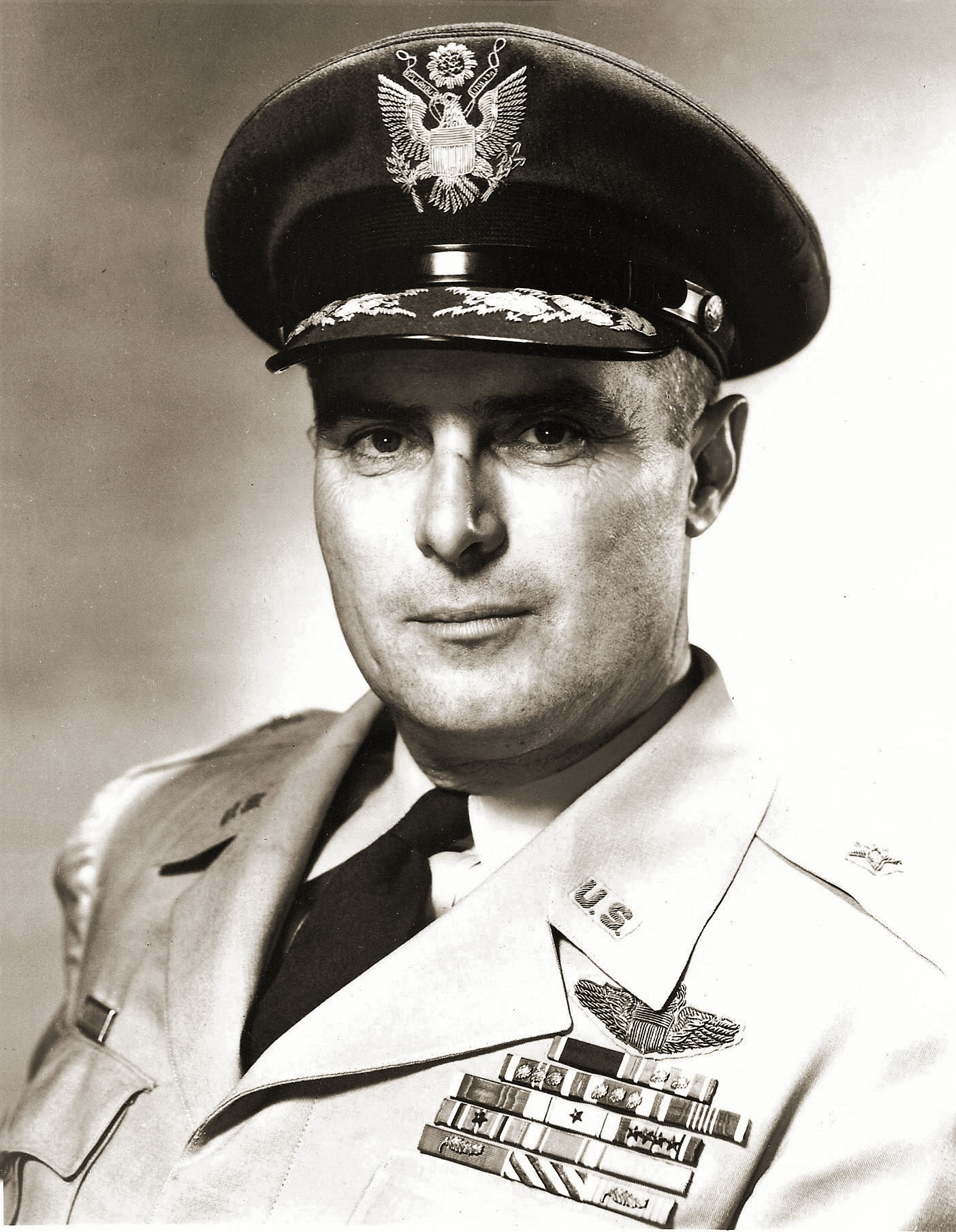
The base's namesake, Brigadier General Robert F. Travis

The base was renamed Travis Air Force Base in 1951 for Brigadier General Robert F. Travis, who was killed when a B-29 Superfortress crashed shortly after takeoff on 5 August 1950. The ensuing fire caused the 10,000 pounds of high explosives in the plane's cargo — a Mark 4 nuclear weapon (minus its nuclear core) — to detonate, killing General Travis and 18 others.

The Military Air Transport Service (MATS) resumed command of Travis AFB on 1 July 1958, after SAC's new dispersal policy led to the transfer of the 14th Air Division to Beale AFB, California and the 1501st Air Transport Wing (Heavy) became the host unit. On 1 January 1966, MATS was redesignated as the Military Airlift Command (MAC) and on 6 January 1966, the 60th Military Airlift Wing (60 MAW) replaced the 1501st ATW as the host unit.

As Travis was an important SAC base, it received anti-aircraft defenses in the 1950s. The 436th Anti-Aircraft Artillery Battalion was active by 1955. The 436th AAAB was redesignated as an antiaircraft artillery missile battalion on 5 January 1957 and subsequently occupied four Nike Ajax sites, which went to 1st Missile Battalion, 61st Artillery on 1 September 1958. Controlling the SAMs was the 29th Artillery Group (Air Defense).

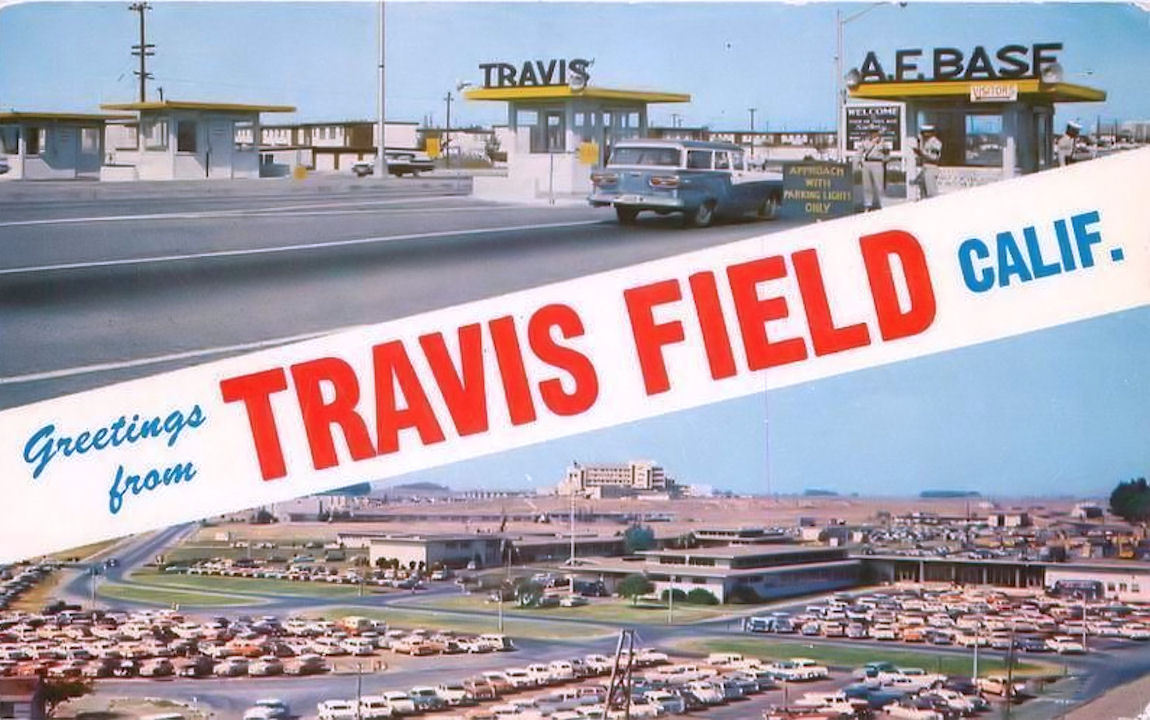
A Travis Air Force Base postcard dating from the 1970s

Over the next three decades, Travis would become known as the "Gateway to the Pacific" in its role as the principal military airlift hub in the western United States. Initially equipped with legacy C-124 Globemaster and C-133 Cargomaster aircraft from the 1501st, the year 1966 would also see the 60 MAW introduce the Air Force's new all-jet heavy airlifter, the C-141 Starlifter. In 1969, the 349th Military Airlift Wing (349 MAW) of the Air Force Reserve (AFRES) was also established as an "Associate" wing to the 60 MAW, with both units sharing the same aircraft and eventually seamlessly mixing flight crews, maintenance crews and other support personnel. In 1970, the 60 MAW and 349 MAW (Assoc) would begin concurrently operating the Air Force's largest airlift aircraft, the C-5 Galaxy. In 1991, the 60 MAW was redesignated as the 60th Airlift Wing (60 AW) and the 349 MAW was redesignated as the 349th Airlift Wing (349 AW) the following year.

In 1992, with the reorganization of the Air Force following the end of the Cold War, Military Airlift Command (MAC) was inactivated and Travis came under the control of the newly established Air Mobility Command (AMC). With the concurrent inactivation of Strategic Air Command (SAC) and the transfer of most of SAC's air refueling aircraft to AMC, the 60 AW gained KC-10 Extender aircraft that had been previously assigned to March AFB, California. With the inclusion of an aerial refueling mission into its long-time strategic airlift mission, the 60 AW and the 349 AW were redesignated as the 60th Air Mobility Wing (60 AMW) and the 349th Air Mobility Wing (349 AMW), the designations they continue to hold. In 1997, the 349 AMW (Assoc) also became part of the newly established Air Force Reserve Command (AFRC) while remaining operationally "gained" by AMC.

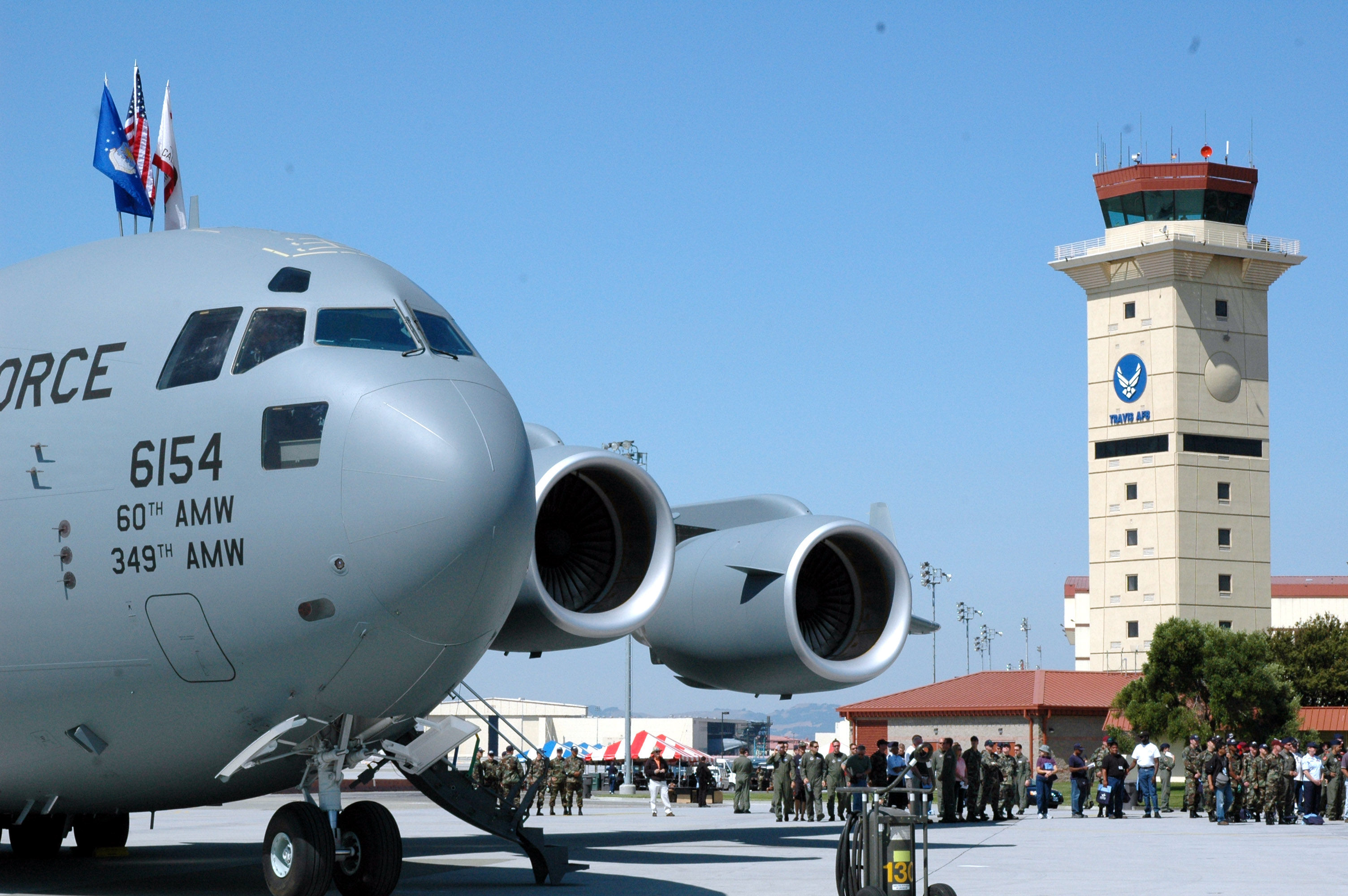
Travis Air Force Base celebrates the arrival of its first C-17A Globemaster III, the "Spirit of Solano", in 2006.

In 1997, the 60 AMW also shed its C-141 aircraft, which were transferred to other Air Force, AFRC and Air National Guard (ANG) wings, while retaining its C-5 and KC-10 aircraft. In 2006, the 60 AMW and 349 AMW (Assoc) again acquired a third aircraft type in their inventory with the arrival of the C-17 Globemaster III.

In January 2017, the Air Force announced that Travis Air Force Base had been selected as a future Boeing KC-46 Pegasus base and will receive a complement of 24 of the new aerial refueling aircraft.

In March 2018, a vehicle filled with propane tanks rammed through the base's main gate and drove into a ditch. Then, the driver ignited a fire inside, causing the vehicle to explode and kill himself. This resulted in the main gate being closed for twelve hours. The driver was later identified as Hafiz Kazi, a 51-year-old Indian-born San Francisco Bay Area resident who had been a legal permanent resident of the U.S. since 1993. The FBI's Sacramento Field Office and the United States Air Force Office of Special Investigations investigated the incident as an act of terrorism, but they said they did not find any evidence of religious affiliations.

In August 2020, the base was evacuated due to the Hennessey Fire, which resulted in the burning of over 315,000 acres (127,476 ha) in five counties including in Solano County.

In 2023, the base hosted the annual California preparedness exercise (Operation Golden Phoenix)

On 28 July 2023, Travis AFB received its first KC-46A Pegasus; which will equip all its former KC-10 squadrons. Travis' final KC-10 left the base on 26 Sept. 2024 for storage at Davis–Monthan Air Force Base.

=== Flannery Associates LLC ===
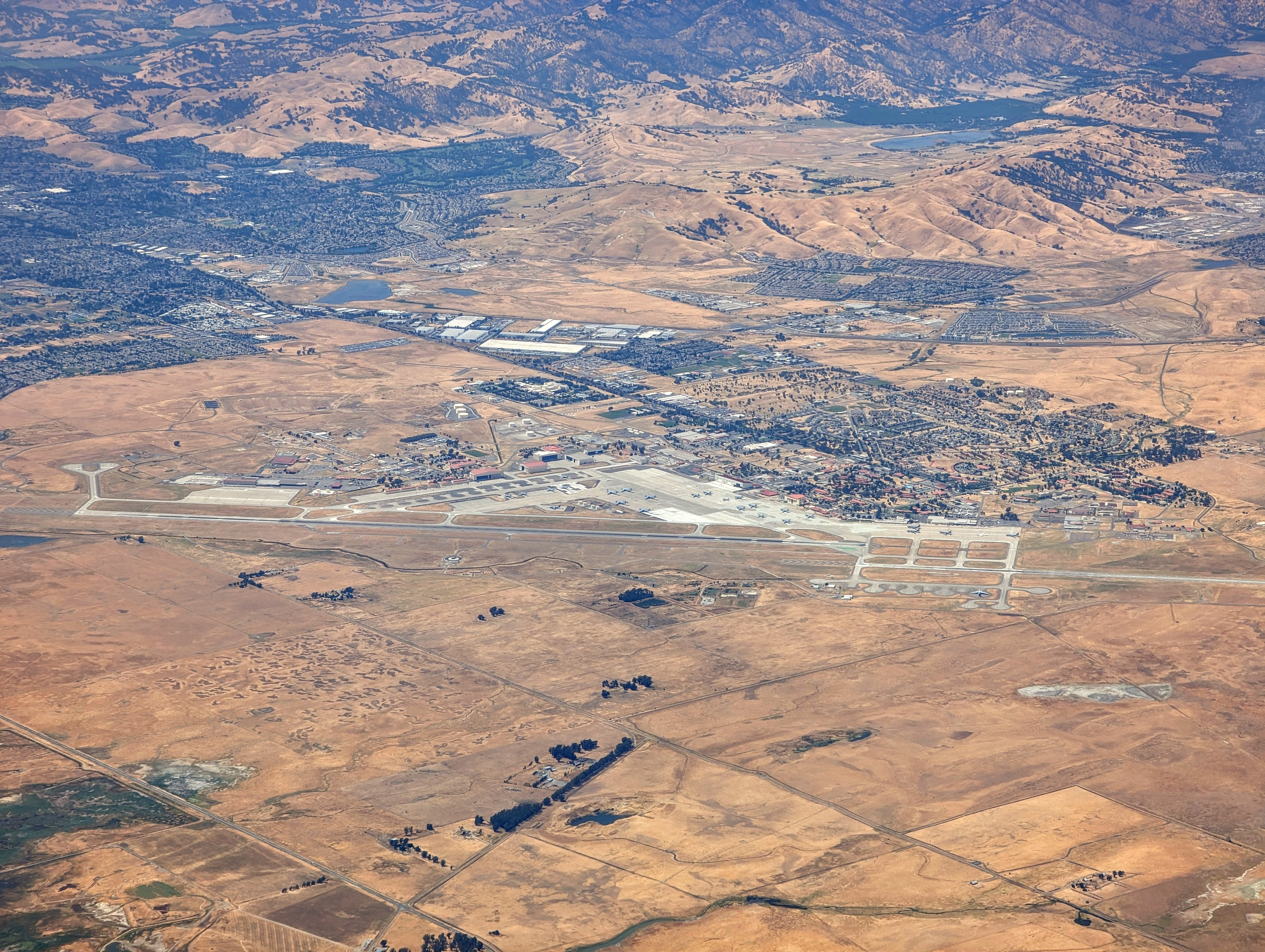
Aerial view of Travis AFB in 2023, showing relatively arid land around the base

Between 2018 and 2023, Flannery Associates LLC purchased over 50,000 acres of land near the air base, prompting investigations into the company's beneficial ownership and widespread media attention. In August 2023, it was revealed that Flannery Associates was a subsidiary of California Forever, which planned to build a city on the land.

=== Role and operations ===
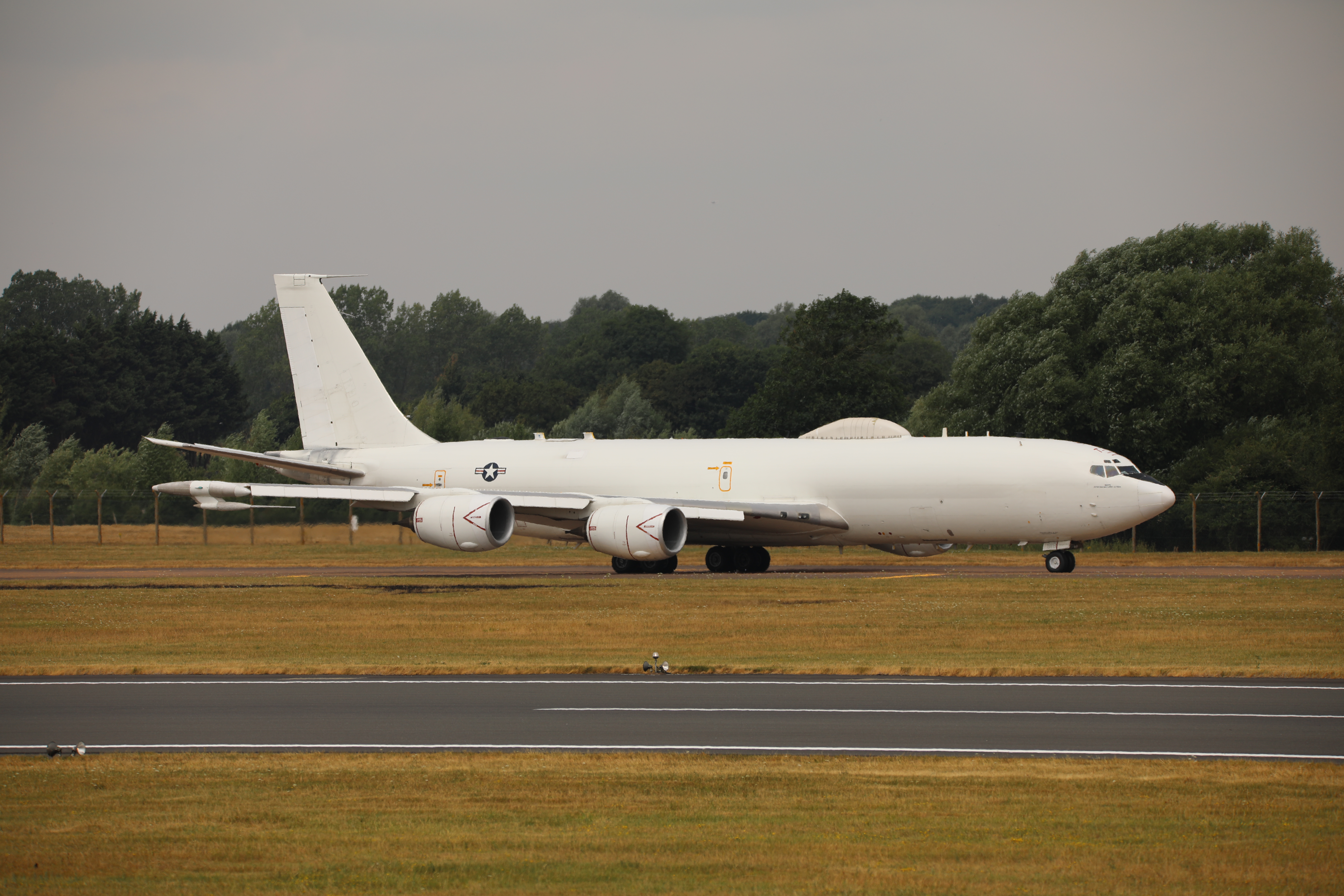
A US Navy E-6B Mercury TACAMO assigned to VQ-3, which maintains a detachment at Travis AFB

The base's host unit, the 60th Air Mobility Wing, is the largest wing in the Air Force's Air Mobility Command, with a fleet of 26 C-5 Galaxies, KC-46 Pegasus, and 13 C-17 Globemaster III aircraft.

In addition, the base's former Strategic Air Command Alert Facility is now a U.S. Navy complex that typically supports two transient Navy E-6B Mercury TACAMO aircraft assigned to Fleet Air Reconnaissance Squadron THREE (VQ-3) Detachment and normally home-based at Tinker AFB, Oklahoma.

The base is also host to David Grant USAF Medical Center, a 265-bed, $200 million Air Force teaching hospital, which serves both in-service and retired military personnel.

=== Maintenance squadrons ===
==== 60th Aircraft Maintenance Squadron ====
The 60th Aircraft Maintenance Squadron provides combat-ready maintenance personnel and organizational support to inspect, service, and repair 26 assigned C-5 aircraft, and maintenance support for Transient Alert. It generates 24-hour-a-day strategic airlift to support four flying squadrons and ensures readiness of personnel and equipment for deployment. It maintains mission ready aircraft capable of worldwide strategic airlift supporting AMC's global mission.

==== 660th Aircraft Maintenance Squadron ====
The 660th Aircraft Maintenance Squadron provides combat-ready maintenance personnel and organizational support to inspect, service, and repair all transient and 6 assigned KC-46A aircraft. It generates aerial refueling and strategic airlift to support flying activities of four aerial refueling squadrons. It ensures readiness of personnel and equipment for deployment. It maintains mission capable aircraft supporting AMC's global mission.

==== 60th Maintenance Squadron ====
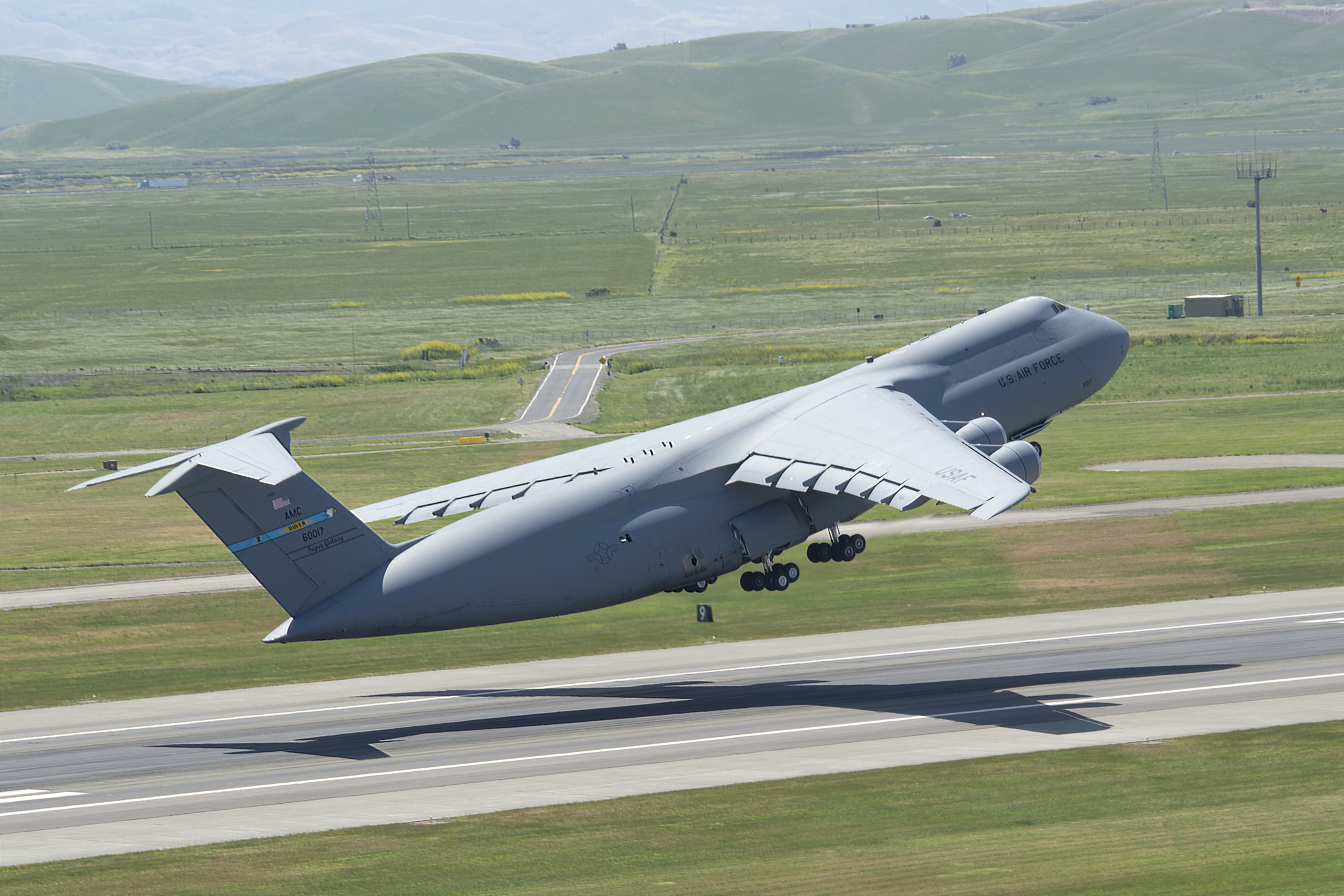
A C-5 Galaxy takes off from Travis AFB during the Thunder Over Solano Air Show in May 2014.

The 60th Maintenance Squadron provides organizational and field-level repair, maintenance, inspection and refurbishment of 26 C-5, and 13 C-17 aircraft. It inspects, services, and overhauls 674 units of aerospace ground equipment worth over $12 million. It manages a 55-acre munitions storage area. It provides mission capable aircraft in direct support of AMC's global mission. It inspects, services, and overhauls aircraft fuel systems. It maintains avionic, hydraulic, electrical and environmental system components for C-5 and C-17 aircraft. It calibrates and repairs over 8,800 items in a regional test, measurement, and diagnostic equipment laboratory. It directly supports AMC's global reach mission for AMC's largest wing.

==== 60th Maintenance Operations Squadron ====
The 60th Maintenance Operations Squadron provides critical support for the maintenance, modification and scheduling of 26 C-5 aircraft valued at $9 billion. It controls maintenance actions and manages all aircraft and mission statistics. It manages $340 million in real property and provides group-level mobility support for AMC's largest wing. It develops and executes aircraft/ancillary training and provides aircraft maintenance training support for the Pacific Rim.

==== 860th Aircraft Maintenance Squadron ====
The 860th Aircraft Maintenance Squadron provides combat-ready maintenance personnel and organizational support to inspect, service, and repair 13 assigned C-17A aircraft, and maintenance support for Transient Alert. It generates 24-hour-a-day strategic airlift to support two flying squadrons and ensures readiness of personnel and equipment for deployment. It maintains mission ready aircraft capable of worldwide strategic airlift supporting AMC's global mission.

=== Protests ===
Travis AFB has been the target of repeated protests by activists group such as Code Pink in protest of US support for Israel.

On 28 December 2023, 14 activists were arrested at Travis AFB for blockading every entrance into the base.

On 14 March 2024, 5 activists associated with CodePink were arrested for blocking the North Gate to Travis AFB. Simultaneously protest group Occupy Beale blockaded the Schneider and Wheatland gates of Beale AFB.

On 24 March 2024, 11 activists were arrested for blocking the main gate into Travis AFB. Furniture and nails were also found on the road leading to the South Gate of Travis AFB on the morning of 24 March. Activist group NorCal Antiwar Action claims that police used unnecessary brutality against protesters on 24 March, and that two people were hospitalized as a result of the police response to the protest. The group also claims that protesters were complying with police dispersal orders when arrests were made.

== Based units ==
Flying and notable non-flying units are based at Travis Air Force Base.

Units marked GSU are Geographically Separate Units, which although based at Travis are subordinate to a parent unit based at another location.

=== United States Air Force ===
Air Mobility Command (AMC)

- Eighteenth Air Force
  - 60th Air Mobility Wing (host wing)
    - Headquarters 60th Air Mobility Wing
    - 60th Comptroller Squadron
    - 60th Operations Group
      - 6th Air Refueling Squadron – KC-46 Pegasus
      - 9th Air Refueling Squadron – KC-46 Pegasus
      - 21st Airlift Squadron – C-17A Globemaster III
      - 22nd Airlift Squadron – C-5M Galaxy
      - 60th Operations Support Squadron
      - 60th Aeromedical Evacuation Squadron
    - 60th Maintenance Group
      - 60th Aerial Port Squadron
      - 60th Aircraft Maintenance Squadron
      - 60th Maintenance Squadron
      - 60th Maintenance Operation Squadron
      - 660th Aircraft Maintenance Squadron
      - 860th Aircraft Maintenance Squadron
    - 60th Medical Group
      - 60th Aerospace Medicine Squadron
      - 60th Dental Squadron
      - 60th Diagnostics & Therapeutics Squadron
      - 60th Inpatient Squadron
      - 60th Medical Operations Squadron
      - 60th Medical Support Squadron
      - 60th Surgical Operations Squadron
      - David Grant USAF Medical Center
    - 60th Mission Support Group
      - 60th Civil Engineer Squadron
      - 60th Communications Squadron
      - 60th Contracting Squadron
      - 60th Force Support Squadron
      - 60th Logistics Readiness Squadron
      - 60th Security Forces Squadron
  - US Air Force Expeditionary Center
    - 621st Contingency Response Wing
      - 621st Air Mobility Advisory Group (GSU)
        - 321st Air Mobility Operations Squadron
        - 571st Mobility Support Advisory Squadron
      - 821st Contingency Response Group (GSU)
        - 821st Contingency Response Squadron
        - 821st Contingency Response Support Squadron

Air Force Reserve Command (AFRC)

- Fourth Air Force
  - 349th Air Mobility Wing
    - Headquarters 349th Air Mobility Wing
    - 349th Operations Group
      - 70th Air Refueling Squadron – Transitioning to KC-46 Pegasus
      - 79th Air Refueling Squadron – Transitioning to KC-46 Pegasus
      - 301st Airlift Squadron – C-17A Globemaster III
      - 312th Airlift Squadron – C-5M Galaxy
      - 349th Aeromedical Evacuation Squadron
      - 349th Operations Support Squadron
      - 349th Air Mobility Operations Squadron
    - 349th Maintenance Group
      - 349th Aircraft Maintenance Squadron
      - 349th Maintenance Operations Flight
      - 349th Maintenance Squadron
      - 749th Aircraft Maintenance Squadron
      - 945th Aircraft Maintenance Squadron
    - 349th Medical Group
      - 349th Aerospace Medicine Squadron
      - 349th Aeromedical Staging Squadron
      - 349th Medical Squadron
    - 349th Mission Support Group
      - 45th Aerial Port Squadron
      - 55th Aerial Port Squadron
      - 82nd Aerial Port Squadron
      - 349th Civil Engineer Squadron
      - 349th Logistics Readiness Squadron
      - 349th Force Support Squadron
      - 349th Security Forces Squadron

=== United States Navy ===
Commander, Naval Air Forces (COMNAVAIRFOR)

- Strategic Communications Wing ONE
  - Fleet Air Reconnaissance Squadron THREE (VQ-3)
    - Detachment (GSU) – E-6B Mercury

US Fleet Forces Command (USFF)

- US Naval Information Forces
  - Naval Computer and Telecommunications Area Master Station, Pacific
    - Naval Computer and Telecommunication Station San Diego
      - Naval Computer and Telecommunications Strategic Communications Unit
        - NCTSCU Detachment Fairfield (GSU)

=== Defense Threat Reduction Agency (DTRA) ===
- DTRA Travis

== Museum ==
Travis AFB is host to the Travis Air Force Base Heritage Center, one of the largest collections of military aircraft on the west coast.

The Museum of Military Aviation History has a representative collection of American military aircraft from various periods: fighters, bombers, trainers, cargo and liaison aircraft. Its exhibits showcase Jimmy Doolittle and the Tokyo Raiders, the 15th AF in WW II, the Tuskegee Airmen, the Consairways story, the Berlin Airlift, and the history of Travis AFB with special emphasis on the Korean War, the Vietnam War, and other significant military missions.

Other exhibits include a space capsule for children, air force uniforms, the nose of a WWII glider, WWII aircraft recognition models, a Link Trainer, aircraft engines, and the cockpits of a T-28, a T-37, and an F-100.

== Airlines ==
=== Cargo ===
| Airlines | Destinations |
|---|---|
| Atlas Air | Anchorage-Merrill, Chicago O'Hare |
| Kalitta Air | Anchorage-Merrill, Los Angeles |

== Education ==
Dependent children living on-post are zoned to schools in the Travis Unified School District. On-post residents may be assigned to Scandia Elementary School or Travis Elementary School. The zoned secondary schools for on-post housing are Golden West Middle School and Vanden High School.

== In popular culture ==
- John D. MacDonald, author of the best-selling Travis McGee suspense novels, has written that he specifically named his protagonist after the Air Force base.
- Larry Bond mentions Travis AFB in his 1989 techno-thriller Red Phoenix, as the Army's elite 7th Infantry Division's deployment point, from their base at Fort Ord, to reinforce the Eighth Army in the Republic of Korea after the North Korean invasion.

== See also ==
- California World War II Army Airfields
