= Edwin M. Shepard =

United States Navy admiral (1843–1904)

Edwin Malcolm Shepard
- Edwin M. Shepard in 1902
- Born: September 16, 1843; Oswego, New York, US
- Died: August 17, 1904 (aged 60); Jeffrey, New Hampshire, US
- Burial place: Arlington National Cemetery
- Military career
- Allegiance: United States
- Branch: United States Navy
- Service years: 1859–1904
- Rank: Rear Admiral
- Commands: Constitution; Enterprise; St. Mary's
- Conflicts: American Civil War

Edwin Malcolm Shepard (September 16, 1843 – August 17, 1904) was a rear admiral of the United States Navy, who served during the Civil War.

== Biography ==
Shepard was born in Oswego, New York. On November 24, 1859 he received an appointment to the United States Naval Academy, from where graduated in 1861 at the start of the Civil War. He was assigned to the sloop-of-war Vincennes, and served on the West Gulf Blockading Squadron from 1861 to 1862.

On November 22, 1862 he was promoted to ensign and assigned to the sidewheel steamer Mississippi and continued to serve on the blockading squadron until 1863. He served on the ironclad gunboat Essex and was on board this ship during the siege of Port Hudson. Shepard received a letter of commendation from General Richard Arnold, who was General Nathaniel P. Banks' Chief of Artillery, after he had served on shore with a naval battery for several weeks.

Shepard served on the monitor Mahopac during the siege of Charleston, South Carolina, then on the steam sloop Wachusett during the capture of the Confederate privateer Florida on October 7, 1864. He was commissioned as a lieutenant on February 22, 1864.

After the capture of Florida Shepard served on the steamer Vanderbilt and the monitor Dictator before being assigned to the steamer Osceola, part of the North Atlantic Squadron. He then served on the apprentice-ship Saratoga from 1868 to 1869.

Shepard served on several other ships before being promoted to commander on 9 May 1878. From 1878 to 1881 he was at the Naval Academy, and immediately after from 1879 to 1881 commanded the famous frigate USS Constitution, and then, in 1882, USS Enterprise.

From 1882–1886 Shepard was the Superintendent of the New York Nautical School on board the sloop-of-war St. Mary's. He was then assigned to the Philadelphia Naval Asylum. In May 1889, he was given the command of the Kearsarge. From the Kearsarge he went to the Mohican, which was with the Pacific Squadron, remaining there from February 1890 to August 1891. After that service he was made Lighthouse Inspector until his promotion to Captain in May 1893, when he was detailed as equipment officer of the New York Navy Yard for four months. He then commanded Minnesota from August 1893 to November 1894, then San Francisco until July 1897, and finally the receiving ship Richmond through April 1898. Afterwards, he again served as a lighthouse inspector until 1901.

Shepard was promoted to captain on May 15, 1893, and to rear admiral on March 3, 1901. In 1901, Shepard became the first flag officer to become a student at the Naval War College.

He was a companion of the Military Order of the Loyal Legion of the United States.

Shepard retired on June 13, 1902 on his own request. He died on August 17, 1904, of heart disease, and was buried at Arlington National Cemetery. He was married to Alice Stevens Shepard, who died in 1915 and was buried next to her husband.

== Gallery ==
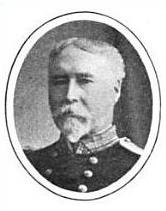
