= VQ-3 =

US Navy communications aircraft squadron

Fleet Air Reconnaissance Squadron 3
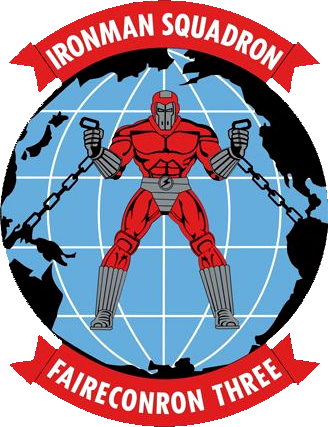
- VQ-3 insignia
- Active: 1 July 1968—present
- Country: United States of America
- Branch: United States Navy
- Type: Fleet air reconnaissance
- Role: TACAMO
- Garrison/HQ: Tinker Air Force Base

Aircraft flown
- Reconnaissance: Lockheed EC-130G/Q Hercules; Boeing E-6 Mercury

Fleet Air Reconnaissance Squadron 3 (VQ-3), nicknamed the Ironmen, is a naval aviation squadron of the United States Navy based at Tinker Air Force Base, Oklahoma (United States). The squadron flies the Boeing E-6B Mercury airborne command post and communications relay aircraft. It is part of the Navy's TACAMO community, whose mission is to enable the president of the United States and the secretary of defense to directly communicate with U.S. submarines, bombers, and missile silos during a nuclear war.

== Operations ==
VQ-3 has a complement of 78 officers and 454 enlisted personnel. Since 1992, it has operated under Navy Strategic Communications Wing 1 at Tinker Air Force Base. It deploys aircraft to fly operational patrols out of Travis Air Force Base, California.

== History ==
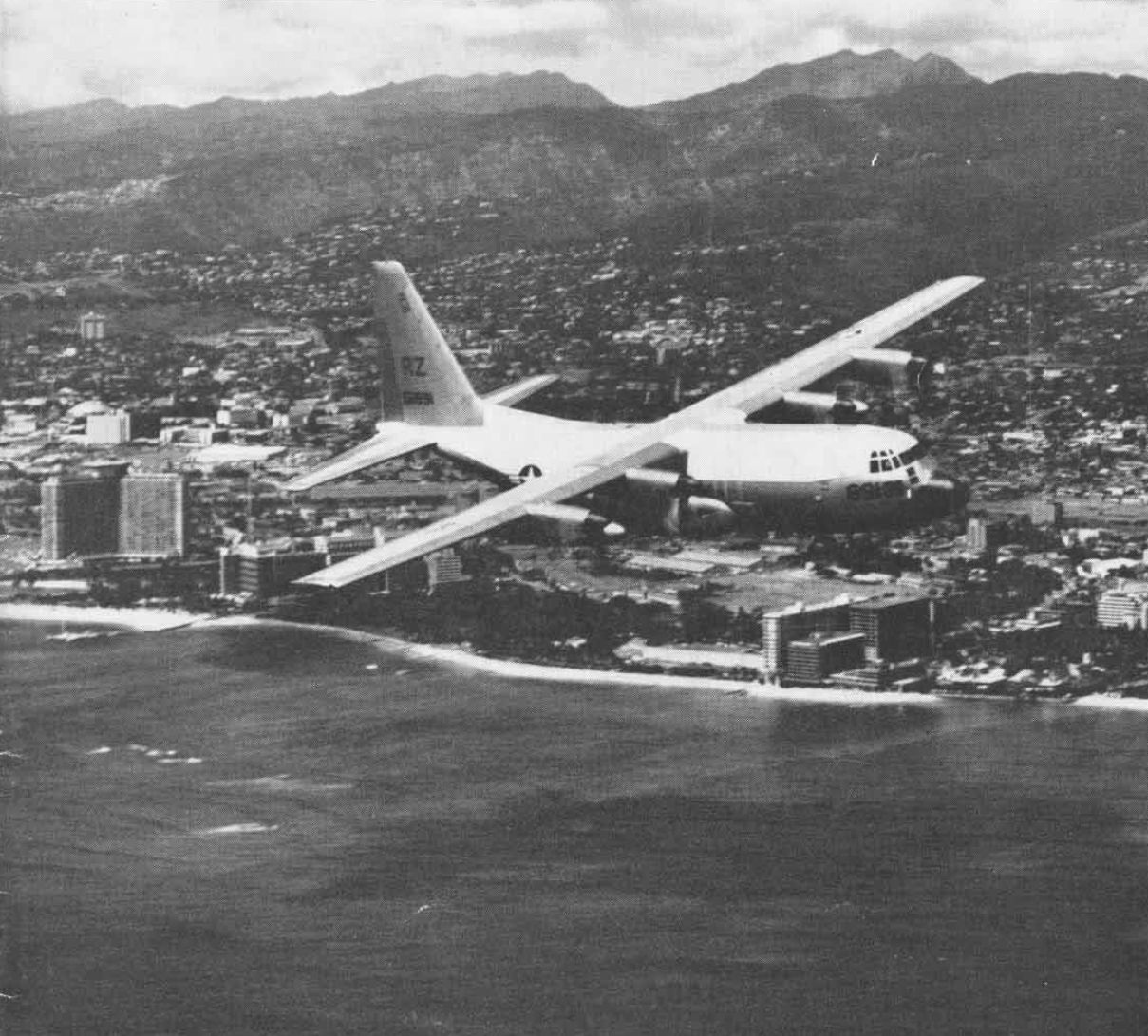
An EC-130Q of VR-21 off Hawaii, circa 1964.

The squadron began on 23 December 1963 as a detachment of Fleet Tactical Support Squadron 21 (VR-21) at Naval Air Station Barbers Point, Hawaii. It operated a specialized version of the Lockheed C-130 Hercules aircraft, the EC-130G. In early 1966, it moved to NAS Agana, Guam, becoming part of Airborne Early Warning Squadron 1 (VW-1). On 1 July 1968, the TACAMO detachment became Fleet Air Reconnaissance Squadron 3 (VQ-3). The EC-130G was replaced by the EC-130Q in 1969 and 1970. VQ-3 returned to Barbers Point in 1980. The squadron transitioned from the EC-130Q to the Boeing E-6A Mercury in 1989-90, and relocated to Tinker Air Force Base in 1992.

The TACAMO Community Veterans Association organization has a museum and history kiosk at Kalaeloa Airport, on the site of the former NAS Barbers Point. It was dedicated 6 September 2016, with former members of VQ-3, VQ-4, and VQ-7 in attendance, chronicling the history of VQ-3.
