= List of United States bomber aircraft =

This is a list of United States bomber aircraft, including those with the capability of bombing, meaning aircraft such as strike aircraft (also known as tactical bombers) and torpedo bombers are included.

== 1915–1935 (First Flight) ==
Name & Role	Year of first flight	Introduction	Status	Number built	Photo
Airco DH.4	1917		retired 1932		
Curtiss Model H patrol flying boat	1917		Retired	478	
Curtiss HS patrol flying boat	1917		Retired	1,178	
Curtiss F5L patrol flying boat	1918		Retired	227	
Martin MBT/MT	1918		Retired	20	
Consolidated P2Y patrol flying boat	1929		retired 1941	78	
Bellanca 77-140 medium bomber	1934		retired 1942	4	
Consolidated PBY Catalina maritime patrol flying boat/amphibian	1935		retired 1980s	4,051 ca.	
Curtiss A-3/A-4 Falcon attack/light bomber	1924		retired 1937	155	
Curtiss A-8 attack/light bomber	1931		retired 1939	13	
Curtiss A-12 Shrike attack/light bomber	1933		retired 1942	46	
Curtiss XA-14 attack/light bomber	1935		retired prototype	1	
Curtiss A-18 Shrike attack/light bomber	1935		retired 1943	13	
Curtiss B-2 Condor heavy bomber	1929		retired 1934	13	
Curtiss BF2C Goshawk fighter-bomber	1933		retired 1949	166	
Curtiss CS torpedo bomber	1923		Retired	83	
Curtiss T-32 Condor II bomber/transport	1933		Retired	45	
Douglas DT torpedo bomber	1921		Retired	90	
Douglas B-18 Bolo heavy bomber	1935		retired 1946	350	
Douglas Y1B-7 bomber	1931		retired prototype	8	
Fokker XB-8 bomber	1929		retired prototype	7	
Great Lakes BG dive bomber	1933		retired 1941	61	
Huff-Daland XB-1 heavy bomber	1927		retired prototype	1	
Keystone B-3 medium bomber, heavy bomber	1929		retired 1940	36	
Keystone B-4 medium bomber, heavy bomber	1930		retired	30	
Keystone B-5 medium bomber, heavy bomber	1929		retired	30	
Keystone B-6 medium bomber, heavy bomber	1931		retired	44	
Martin NBS-1 night bomber	1920		retired 1929	130	
Martin T3M torpedo bomber	1926		retired 1932	124	
Martin T4M torpedo bomber	1927		retired 1938	155	
Martin B-10 & related medium bomber	1932		retired 1949	342	
Curtiss SBC Helldiver dive bomber	1935		retired 1943	257	
Douglas TBD Devastator torpedo bomber	1935		retired 1944	130	
Northrop A-17 attack bomber	1935		retired 1944	411	
Northrop BT dive bomber	1935		retired 1941	55	
Boeing B-17 Flying Fortress Daylight heavy bomber	1935	1938	retired 1959	12,731	

== 1936–1945 (First Flight) ==
Name	Year of first flight	Retired/Status	Number built	Photo
Beechcraft XA-38 Grizzly medium/attack bomber	1944	retired prototype	2	
Boeing B-29 Superfortress/Washington heavy bomber	1942	retired 1960	3,970	
Boeing Model 306 heavy bomber, flying boat	n/a	abandoned 1935 project	0	
Boeing XB-15 heavy bomber	1937	retired prototype 1944	1	
Boeing XB-38 Flying Fortress heavy bomber	1943	Lost 1943 project cancelled	1	
Boeing XB-39 Superfortress heavy bomber	1944	retired prototype	1	
Boeing XF8B fighter bomber	1944	retired prototype	3	
Boeing XPBB Sea Ranger maritime patrol bomber	1942	retired prototype	1	
Brewster SB2A Buccaneer scout bomber	1941	retired 1944	771	
Consolidated B-24 Liberator heavy bomber	1939	retired 1968	18,482 (Note: Production figure includes aircraft used as transports)	
Consolidated B-32 Dominator heavy bomber	1942	retired 1945	118	
Consolidated PB4Y-2 Privateer patrol bomber	1943	retired 1962	739	
Consolidated PB2Y Coronado maritime patrol flying boat	1937	retired 1945	217	
Consolidated XP4Y Corregidor maritime patrol flying boat	1939	retired prototype	1	
Curtiss SB2C Helldiver/A-25 Shrike dive bomber	1940	retired 1959	7,140	
Curtiss XBTC torpedo bomber	1945	retired prototype	2	
Curtiss XSB3C dive bomber	n/a	abandoned 1941 project	0	
Douglas A-1 Skyraider attack aircraft	1945	retired 1985	3,180	
Douglas A-20 Havoc medium bomber	1939	retired 1949	7,478 (Note: Production figure includes fighters or other non-bomber variants)	
Douglas A-26 Invader medium bomber	1942	retired 1980	2,452	
Douglas XB-19 heavy bomber	1941	retired prototype	1	
Douglas XB-22 medium bomber	n/a	abandoned project	0	
Douglas B-23 Dragon medium bomber	1939	retired	38	
Douglas SBD Dauntless dive bomber	1940	retired 1959	5,936	
Douglas BTD Destroyer torpedo bomber/dive bomber	1943	retired 1945	30	
Douglas XTB2D Skypirate torpedo bomber	1945	retired prototype	2	
Grumman Avenger torpedo bomber	1941	retired 1966	9,839	
Grumman AF Guardian anti-submarine aircraft	1945	retired 1955	389 (Note: Production figure includes AEW variant)	
Grumman XTB2F torpedo bomber	n/a	abandoned 1944 project	0	
Hall XPTBH torpedo bomber	1937	retired prototype	1	
Kaiser-Fleetwings XBTK torpedo/dive bomber – prototype	1945	project scrapped 1946	5	
Lockheed Hudson medium bomber/maritime patrol	1938	retired 1948	2,941	
Lockheed P2V Neptune maritime patrol	1945	retired 1984	1,132	
Lockheed Ventura/Harpoon medium bomber/maritime patrol	1941	retired 1974	3,010	
Lockheed XB-30 heavy bomber – project	n/a	abandoned project	0	
Martin B-26 Marauder medium bomber	1940	retired 1946	5,288	
Martin Baltimore medium bomber	1941	retired 1949	1,575	
Martin PBM Mariner maritime patrol	1939	retired 1964	1,285	
Martin Maryland medium bomber/reconnaissance bomber	1939	retired 1945	450	
Martin AM Mauler attack aircraft	1944	retired 1953	151	
Martin XB-27 heavy bomber	n/a	abandoned project	0	
Martin XB-33 Super Marauder heavy bomber	n/a	abandoned project	0	
Naval Aircraft Factory SBN dive bomber	1936	retired 1942	31	
North American A-27 attack	1940	retired 1941	10	
North American T-6 Texan light attack	1940	retired	15,495 (Note: Production figure includes trainers)	
North American XB-21 medium bomber	1936	retired prototype	1	
North American B-25 Mitchell medium bomber	1940	retired 1979	9,984	
North American XB-28 medium bomber	1942	retired prototype	2	
Northrop N-3PB patrol bomber	1940	retired 1943	24	
Republic P-47 Thunderbolt fighter-bomber	1941	retired 1966	15,678	
Vought F4U Corsair fighter-bomber	1940	retired 1979	12,571	
Vought SB2U Vindicator/Chesapeake dive bomber	1936	retired 1945	260	
Vought TBU/Consolidated TBY Sea Wolf torpedo bomber	1941	retired 1948	180	
Vultee A-31/A-35 Vengeance dive bomber	1941	retired 1945	1,528	

== 1946–current ==
Name of Bomber	Year of first flight	Retired/Status	Number built	bombload (kg)	Photo
Boeing B-47 Stratojet strategic bomber	1947	retired 1977	2,032	11,340	
Boeing B-50 Superfortress strategic bomber	1947	retired 1965	370	12,700	
Boeing B-52 Stratofortress strategic bomber	1952	operational	744	31,500	
Boeing XB-54 strategic bomber	n/a	abandoned 1948 project	0	16,400	
Boeing XB-56 strategic bomber	n/a	abandoned 1950 project	0	11,300	
Boeing XB-59 strategic bomber	n/a	abandoned 1952 project	0	4,500	
Cessna A-37 Dragonfly light attack aircraft	1963	retired	577	1,860	
Convair B-36 Peacemaker heavy bomber	1946	retired 1959	384	39,600	
Convair B-58 Hustler strategic bomber	1956	retired 1970	116	8,820	
Convair XB-46 heavy bomber	1947	retired prototype	1	10,000	
Convair YB-60 heavy bomber	1952	retired prototype	2	33,000	
Douglas A2D Skyshark attack aircraft	1950	retired prototype	8	2,500	
Douglas A-3 Skywarrior strategic bomber	1956	retired 1991	282	5,800	
Douglas A-4 Skyhawk attack aircraft	1954	retired	2,960	3,720	
Douglas B-66 Destroyer tactical bomber	1954	retired 1973	72	6,800	
Fairchild Republic A-10 Thunderbolt II attack aircraft	1972	operational	716	7,260	
General Dynamics F-111 Aardvark medium bomber	1967	retired 1998	563	14,300	
Grumman A-6 Intruder attack aircraft	1960	retired 1997	693	8,200	
Grumman F9F Panther fighter-bomber	1947	retired 1969	1,382	910	
Grumman OV-1 Mohawk light attack	1959	retired 1996	380	450	
Grumman S-2 Tracker anti-submarine aircraft	1952	retired 1976	1,284	2,200	
Lockheed F-117 Nighthawk stealth attack aircraft	1981	retired 2008	64	2,300	
Lockheed P-3 Orion/CP-140 Aurora/Arcturus maritime patrol	1959	operational	757	9,100	
Lockheed S-3 Viking anti-submarine aircraft	1972	retired	188	2,200	
Martin B-57 Canberra reconnaissance bomber	1953	retired	403 (Note: Production figure includes reconnaissance variants)	3,300	
Martin P4M Mercator maritime patrol	1946	retired 1960	21	5,400	
Martin P5M Marlin maritime patrol	1948	retired 1967	285	7,200	
Martin P6M SeaMaster strategic bomber	1955	retired 1959	12	14,000	
Martin XB-48 medium bomber	1947	retired prototype	2	9,000	
Martin XB-51 attack bomber	1949	retired prototype	2	4,700	
McDonnell Douglas A-12 Avenger II attack aircraft	n/a	abandoned 1983 project	0	2,300	
McDonnell Douglas AV-8B Harrier II attack aircraft	1978	operational	323	4,200	
McDonnell Douglas F-4 Phantom II fighter-bomber	1958	retired 2016	5,195	8,500	
McDonnell Douglas F/A-18 Hornet fighter/attack aircraft	1978	operational	1,480	6,200	
North American A-5 Vigilante reconnaissance bomber	1958	retired 1980	156	6,200	
North American AJ/A-2 Savage nuclear attack bomber	1948	retired 1964	143	5,400	
North American B-45 Tornado reconnaissance bomber	1947	retired 1959	143	10,000	
North American Rockwell OV-10 Bronco light attack	1965	operational	370	230	
North American T-28 Trojan light attack	1949	retired 1994	1,948	540	
North American XA2J Super Savage bomber	1952	retired prototype	1	4,800	
North American XB-70 Valkyrie strategic bomber prototype	1964	retired prototype	2	22,500	
Northrop Grumman B-2 Spirit stealth bomber	1989	operational	21	18,000	
Northrop YA-9 attack aircraft	1972	retired prototype	2	7,300	
Northrop YB-35 heavy bomber	1946	retired prototype	4	23,200	
Northrop YB-49 heavy bomber	1947	retired prototype	4	7,300	
Piper PA-48 Enforcer counter-insurgency/attack aircraft	1971	retired prototype	4	2,600	
Republic F-84 Thunderjet fighter-bomber	1946	retired 1973	7,524	2,000	
Republic F-84F Thunderstreak fighter-bomber	1954	retired 1991	3,428	2,700	
Republic F-105 Thunderchief fighter-bomber	1955	retired 1984	833	6,400	
Rockwell B-1 Lancer strategic bomber	1974	operational, to be retired by 2036	104	34,000	
Northrop Grumman B-21 Raider stealth bomber	2023	in development	1	18000 (est.)	

== See also ==
- Bomber
- List of bomber aircraft
- List of military aircraft of the United States
- Northrop Grumman B-21 Raider, US heavy bomber under development

== Bibliography ==
- Andrade, John M. (1979). U.S. Military Aircraft Designations and Serials Since 1909. Midland Counties Publications. ISBN 978-0-904597-22-6.
- Fahey, James C. (1946). U.S. Army Aircraft 1908–1946.
- Michael J.H. Taylor, ed. (1991). Jane's American Fighting Aircraft of the 20th Century. New York, NY: Mallard Press. ISBN 978-0-7924-5627-8.
