= B27 =

B27 may refer to:

- Bundesstraße 27, a German road
- HLA-B27, an HLA B serotype
- Mark 27 nuclear bomb
- Martin XB-27, a proposed experimental American aircraft
- Blog 27, a Polish teen pop band
