= List of active United States Air Force aircraft =

Emblem of the USAF

The following is a list of currently active military aircraft in the United States Air Force.

== Aircraft ==
Aircraft	Origin	Type	Variant	In service	Notes
Fighter aircraft (1,794)
McDonnell Douglas F-15 Eagle	United States	air superiority	F-15C Eagle	42	75 F-15C/D total force as of September 2025 42 F-15C - Air National Guard
McDonnell Douglas F-15E Strike Eagle	United States	multirole		203	208 F-15E total force as of March 2026 203 F-15E - Active 5 F-15E - Shot down over Iran/destroyed in the Middle East due to Iranian missile and drone bombardment (203 active aircraft remaining)
Boeing F-15EX Eagle II	United States	multirole		27	13 F-15EX total force as of September 2025 6 F-15EX - Active 21 F-15EX - Air National Guard (267 units planned)
General Dynamics F-16 Fighting Falcon	United States	multirole	F-16C Fighting Falcon	814	814 F-16C total force as of September 2024 400 F-16C - Active 257 F-16C - Air National Guard
Lockheed Martin F-22 Raptor	United States	stealth air superiority	F-22A	183	183 F-22A total force as of September 2024 163 F-22A - Active 20 F-22A - Air National Guard
Lockheed Martin F-35 Lightning II	United States	stealth multirole	F-35A Lightning II	525	525 F-35A total force as of May 2026 (USAF Visual in May 2025 indicates 471 aircraft) 400 F-35A - Active 43 - Air National Guard (program of record of 1,763 aircraft), between 161 and 189 aircraft on order
Attack aircraft (208)
L3Harris OA-1 Skyraider II	United States	CAS / Reconnaissance	OA-1K	8	8 OA-1K total as of 2026 8 OA-1K – SOC support
Fairchild Republic A-10 Thunderbolt II	United States	ground attack / CAS	A-10C Thunderbolt II	170	172 A-10C total force as of September 2024 139 A-10C - Active 31 A-10C - Air National Guard 2 A-10C - Shot down over Iran
Lockheed AC-130	United States	ground attack / CAS	AC-130J	30	30 AC-130J total force as of September 2024 30 AC-130J - Active
Bomber (142)
Rockwell B-1 Lancer	United States	strategic bomber	B-1B	46	46 B-1B total force as of September 2024 46 B-1B - Active
Northrop B-2 Spirit	United States	strategic stealth bomber	B-2A	20	20 B-2A total force as of September 2024 18 B-2A - Active
Northrop Grumman B-21 Raider	United States	strategic stealth bomber	B-21A	2	2 Raiders currently in service, testing at Edwards Air Force Base CA. A minimum of 100 B-21A must be made.
Boeing B-52 Stratofortress	United States	strategic bomber	B-52H	75	75 B-52H total force as of September 2024 57 B-52H - Active 18 B-52H - Reserve
AWACS (25)
Boeing E-3 Sentry	United States	AWACS	E-3G Sentry	13	13 E-3G total force as of September 2026 (USAF Almanac). 19 E-3G operational (WAF 2025). 1 E-3G destroyed at Prince Sultan Air Base, Saudi Arabia due to an Iranian ballistic missile strike.
Boeing E-4	United States	command and control	E-4B	4	4 E-4B as of September 2023 (USAF Almanac). 4 E-4B operational (WAF 2025).
De Havilland Canada E-9A Widget	Canada	SIGINT / ELINT	E-9A	2	2 E-9A as of September 2023 (USAF Almanac).
Bombardier E-11A	Canada	command and control / BACN	E-11A	5	5 E-11A as of September 2023 (USAF Almanac). 6 E-11A operational, 4 on order (WAF 2025).
Electronic Warfare (14)
L3Harris EA-37B Compass Call	United States	SIGINT / PSYOP / attack	EA-37B	3	3 EC-37B operational, 7 on order (WAF 2025).
EC-130H Compass Call	United States	radar jamming / PSYOP		4	4 EC-130H as of September 204 (USAF Almanac) 4 EC-130H operational (WAF 2025).
EC-130 Commando Solo	United States	radar jamming / PSYOP	EC-130J	5	5 EC-130J as of September 2024 (USAF Almanac). 0 EC-130J - Air National Guard as of September 20, 2024
Reconnaissance
CASA/IPTN CN-235	Spain/Indonesia	SIGINT / ELINT		5	
L3Harris OA-1K Skyraider II	United States	armed reconnaissance		3	
De Havilland Canada P-9 Pale Ale	Canada	Maritime patrol	P-9A	~4	Approx. 4 P-9A total force as of February 2023 (Air Combat Command).
Boeing RC-135	United States	ELINT / surveillance	S/U/V/W	22	The breakdown is as follows: 1 RC-135S Cobra Ball, 2 RC-135U Combat Sent, 1 RC-135V Rivet Joint, 18 RC-135W Rivet Joint.
Lockheed U-2	United States	high altitude reconnaissance	U-2S	27	27 U-2S as of September 2023 (USAF Almanac). 24 U-2S operational (WAF 2025). Trainer aircraft listed separately.
Pilatus U-28 Draco	Switzerland	ISR / SIGINT	U-28A	26	Special Operations Surveillance aircraft.
Tanker
Boeing KC-46 Pegasus	United States	aerial refueling	KC-46A	107	107 KC-46A total force as of September 2026 58 KC-46A - Active 19 KC-46A - Air National Guard
Boeing KC-135 Stratotanker	United States	aerial refueling	KC-135R/T	314	325 KC-135R / 51 KC-135T total force as of September 2024 123 KC-135R / 28 KC-135T - Active 140 KC-135R / 23 KC-135T - Air National Guard
Lockheed HC-130J Super Hercules	United States	SAR / transport / tanker		39	39 total force as of September 2024 21 HC-130J - Active 12 HC-130J - Air National Guard 6 HC-130J - Reserve
Lockheed MC-130J Commando II	United States	EW / transport / tanker		62	62 MC-130J total force as of September 2024 60 MC-130J - Active 2 MC-130J - Air National Guard
Transport
Lockheed C-5 Galaxy	United States	strategic airlifter	C-5M	52	
Beechcraft C-12 Huron	United States	utility / transport		23	
Beechcraft C-12J	United States	transport	C-12J	3	
Boeing C-17 Globemaster III	United States	strategic airlifter		196	222 C-17A total force as of September 2023 (USAF Almanac). 146 C-17A - Active 50 C-17A - Air National Guard 196 C-17A operational (WAF 2025).
Learjet C-21A	United States	VIP transport	C-21A	19	
Boeing C-32	United States	VIP transport		4	
Gulfstream C-37A/B	United States	VIP transport	C-37A; C-37B	13	The breakdown is 12 C-37As and one C-37B (based on the Gulfstream G550).
Boeing C-40 Clipper	United States	VIP transport	C-40B/C	12	The breakdown is four C-40Bs (USAF) and seven C-40Cs (4-USAFR, 3-DC ANG).
Lockheed C-130 Hercules	United States	transport	C-130H	91	91 C-130H total force as of September 2024 0 C-130H - Active 91 C-130H - Air National Guard
Lockheed C-130J Super Hercules	United States	tactical airlifter	C-130J	142	142 C-130J total force as of September 2024 102 C-130J - Active 40 C-130J - Air National Guard (program of record for 198 aircraft)
Dornier C-146 Wolfhound	Germany	transport	C-146A	20	
Cessna U-27A Caravan	United States	transport / utility		2	
de Havilland Canada UV-18B Twin Otter	Canada	utility transport		3	STOL capable aircraft. Supports parachute training for USAFA and AFROTC Cadets.
Boeing VC-25A	United States	Presidential transport		2	
Boeing VC-25B Bridge	United States	Presidential transport		1	Currently less equipped for safety compared to the VC-25A, but based on more modern Boeing 747-8 airframe. Shares responsibility with the VC-25A, primarily used for low-threat domestic flights.
Helicopter
Sikorsky HH-60 Pave Hawk	United States	CSAR	HH-60GW	47	47 HH-60W total force as of September 2024 32 HH-60W - Active 15 HH-60W - Air National Guard
Boeing MH-139A Grey Wolf	Italy	utility	MH-139	8	8 MH-139 total force as of September 2024 8 MH-139 - Active (Maximum order volume of 79 aircraft)
Bell UH-1N Twin Huey	United States	utility		63	63 UH-1N total force as of September 2024
Bell Boeing V-22 Osprey	United States	CSAR	CV-22B	52	52 CV-22B total force as of September 2024 52 CV-22B - Active
Trainers
Embraer A-29 Super Tucano	Brazil	assessment trainer	A-29C	3	
Lockheed F-117 Nighthawk	United States	trainer		4	stealth OPFOR trainer
General Dynamics F-16 Fighting Falcon	United States	trainer	F-16D	134	136 F-16D total force as of September 2024 98 F-16D - Active 36 F-16D - Air National Guard
McDonnell Douglas F-15 Eagle	United States	trainer	F-15D	24	12 F-15D total force as of September 2023 (USAF Almanac). 1 F-15D - Active 11 F-15D - Air National Guard 17 F-15D operational (WAF 2025).
Grob G 120TP	Germany	basic trainer		2	contracted by JPAG Aviation
Raytheon T-1 Jayhawk	United States	multi-engine trainer	T-1A	127	127 T-1A total force as of September 2023 (USAF Almanac). 98 T-6A operational (WAF 2025).
Beechcraft T-6 Texan II	United States	advanced trainer	T-6A	442	442 T-6A total force as of September 2023 (USAF Almanac). 442 T-6A operational (WAF 2025).
Boeing–Saab T-7 Red Hawk	United States	advanced trainer	T-7A	351 units (maximum number of units planned for deployment)	Of these, one unit is deployed and the remaining 350 units are on order.
Game Composites T-19 Kestrel	United Kingdom	aerobatic trainer	T-19A	4	Dedicated aerobatic trainer for the USAFA
Northrop T-38 Talon	United States	jet trainer	T-38A/C AT-38B	495	495 T-38A / T-38C / AT-38B total force as of September 2023 (USAF Almanac). 52 T-38A / 6 AT-38B / 437 T-38C - Active 485 C-17A operational (WAF 2025).
Cessna T-41 Mescalero	United States	basic trainer	T-41D	4	4 total force as of September 2023 (USAF Almanac).
Cessna T-51	United States	basic trainer	T-51A	3	3 total force as of September 2023 (USAF Almanac).
Cirrus T-53A Kadet II	United States	basic trainer	T-53A	24	24 T-53A total force as of September 2023 (USAF Almanac). 25 T-53A operational (WAF 2025).
TG-16	Germany	basic trainer	TG-16A	18	17 TG-16A total force as of November 2025.
Boeing TC-135	United States	multi-engine trainer	TC-135W	3	3 TC-135W total force as of September 2023 (USAF Almanac). 3 TC-135W operational (WAF 2025).
Bell TH-1 Iroquois	United States	rotorcraft trainer	UH-1H	28	28 UH-1H total force as of September 2023 (USAF Almanac). 39 T-53A operational (WAF 2025).
Lockheed TU-2	United States	high altitude reconnaissance trainer	TU-2S	4	4 TU-2S total force as of September 2023 (USAF Almanac). 3 TU-2S operational (WAF 2025).
UAV
General Atomics MQ-9 Reaper	United States	multi-mission	MQ-9A	135	135 MQ-9A total force as of May 2026 114 MQ-9A - Active 21 MQ-9A - Air National Guard
General Atomics MQ-1C Gray Eagle	United States	multi-mission	MQ-1C	204	
Northrop Grumman RQ-4 Global Hawk	United States	ISTAR / SIGINT	RQ-4B	9	9 RQ-4B total force as of September 2023 (USAF Almanac).
AeroVironment RQ-11 Raven	United States	ISR	RQ-11B	3,000	
AeroVironment RQ-20 Puma	United States	ISR	RQ-20B	60	Puma 3 AE variant is on order
Lockheed Martin RQ-170 Sentinel	United States	ISTAR / SIGINT		20	

== Images ==
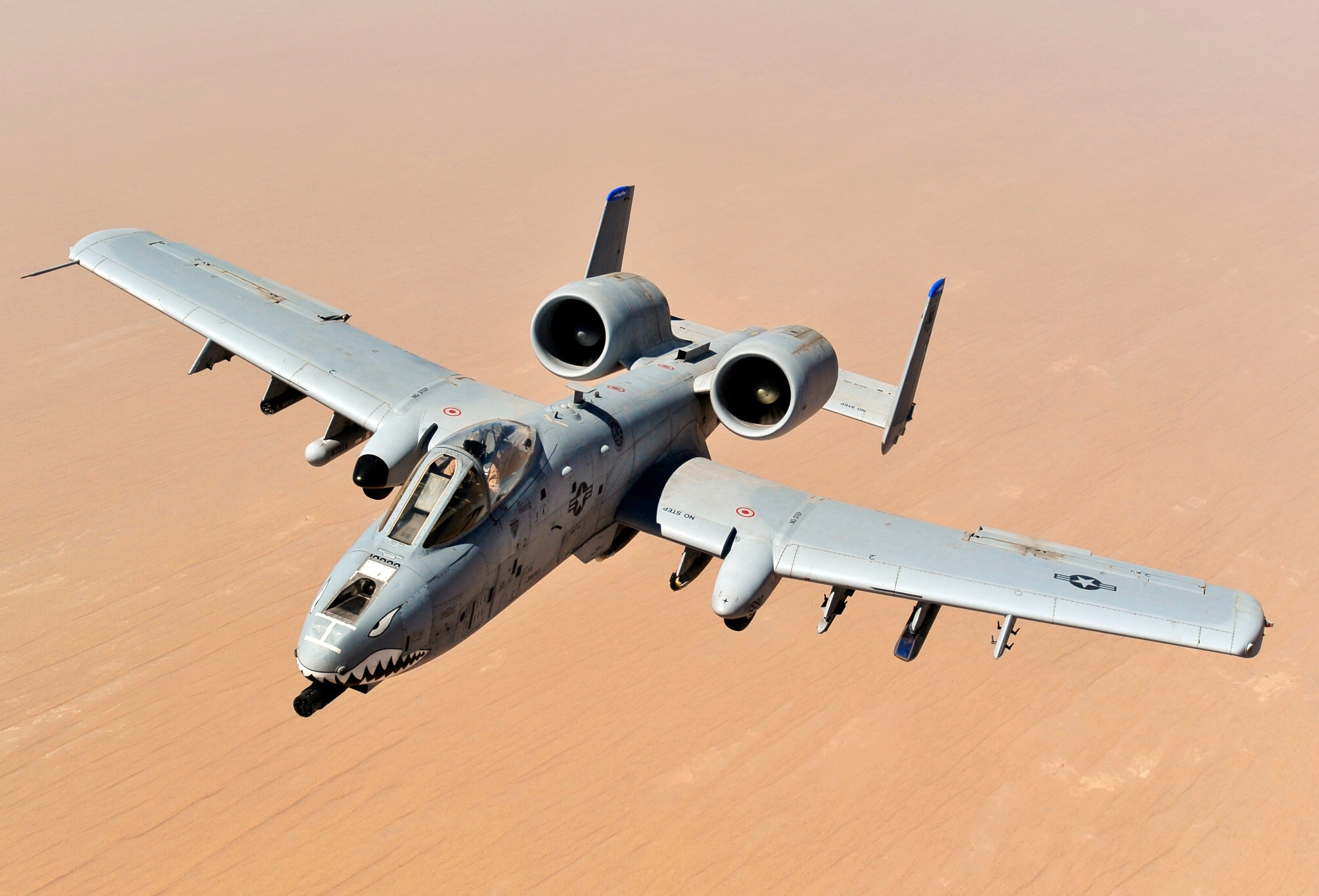
An A-10 Thunderbolt II in 2011. The attack aircraft is used for close air support

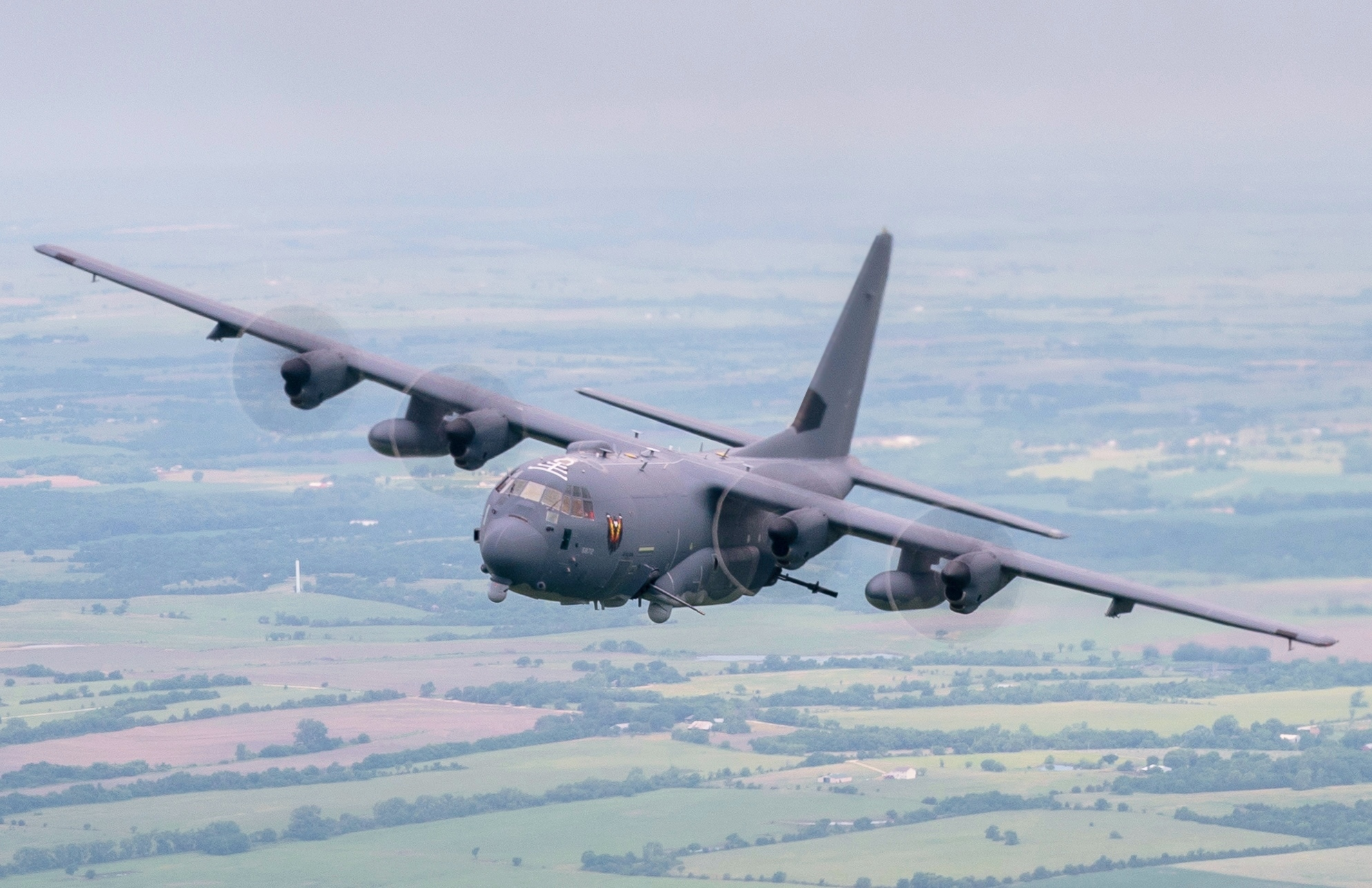
An AC-130J of the 4th Special Operations Squadron flies over Kansas in 2023.

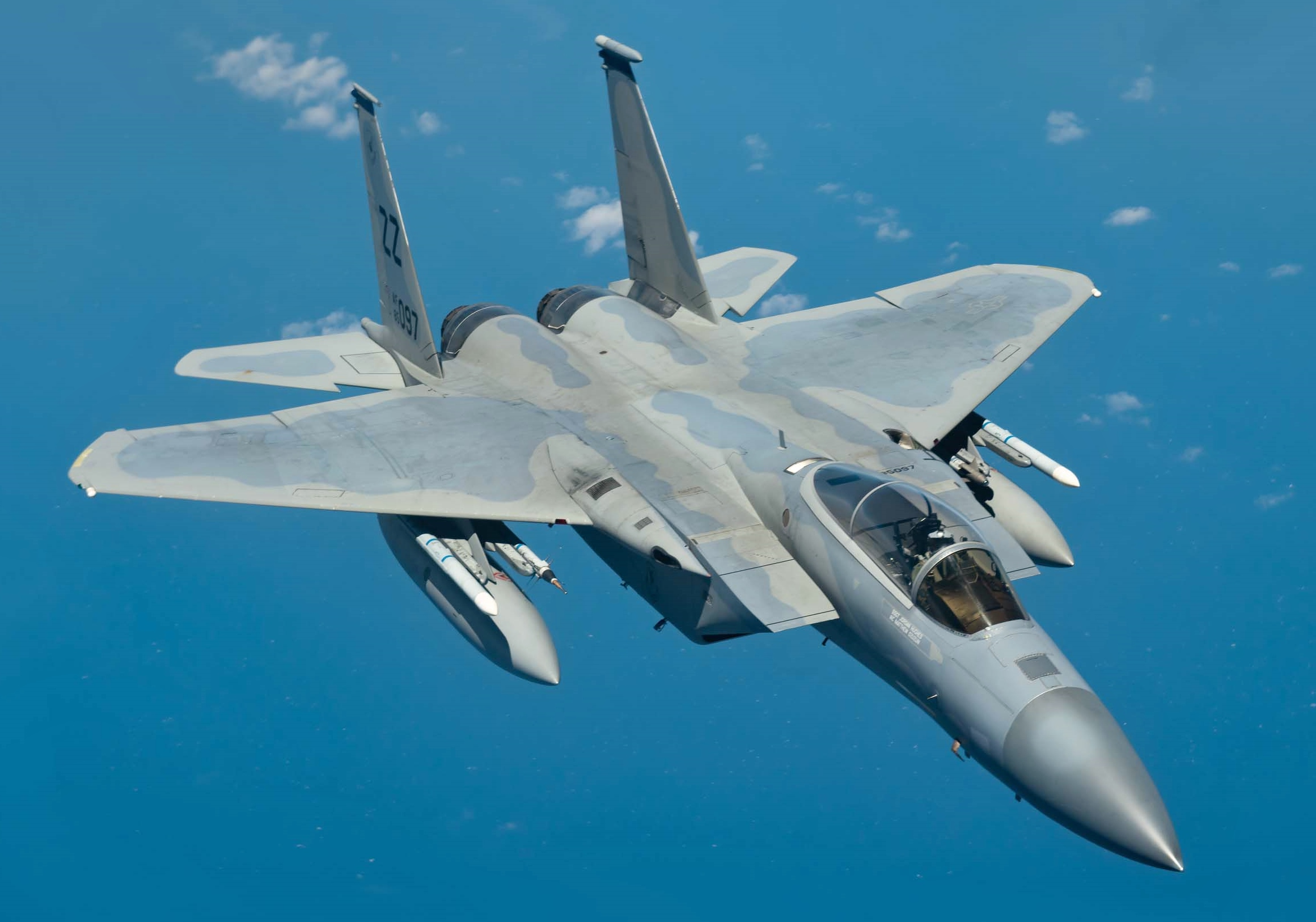
An F-15C Eagle flies over Japan in 2019

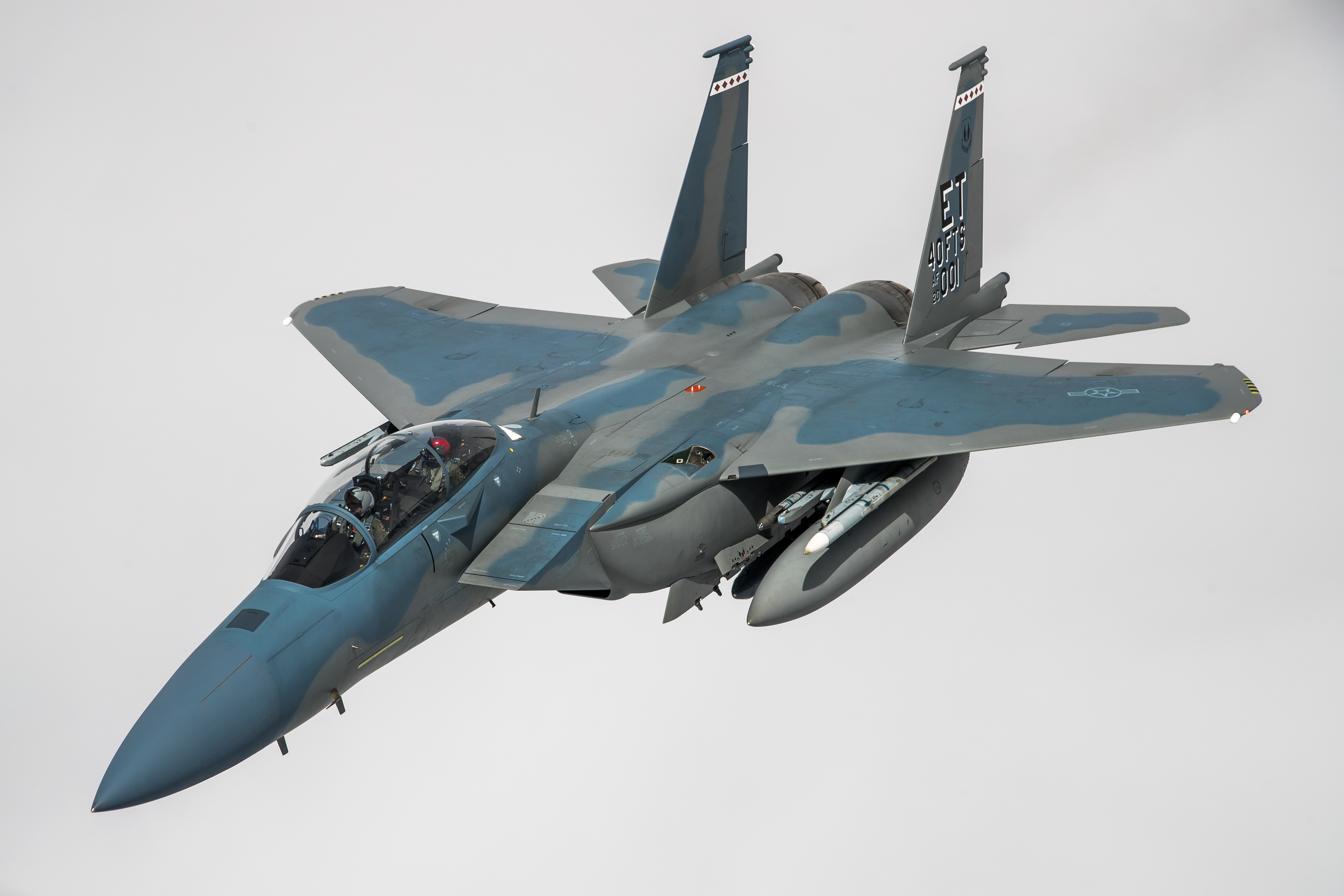
An F-15EX from the 40th Test Flight Squadron flies over Florida in 2023

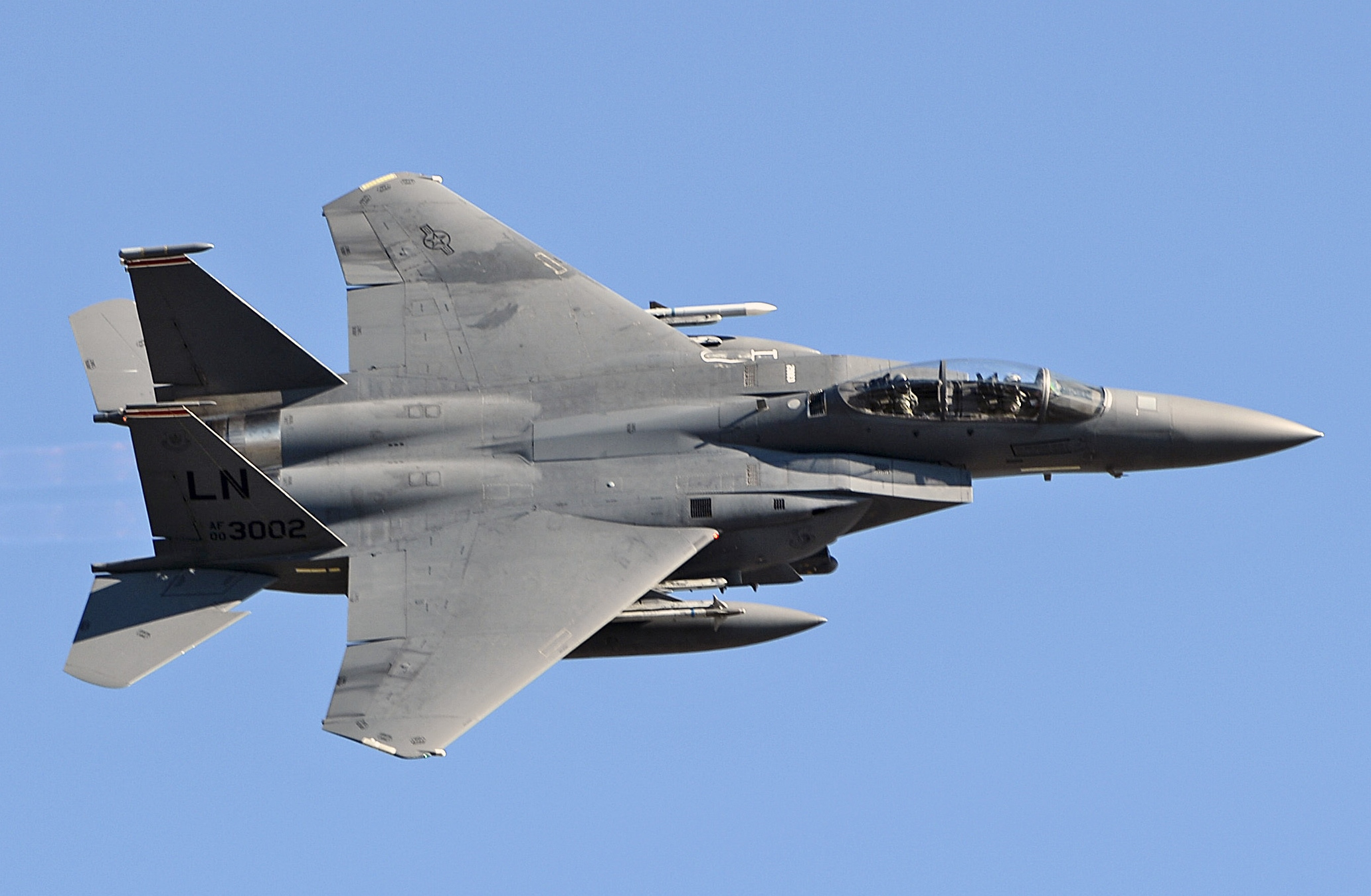
An F-15E Strike Eagle from the 494th Fighter Squadron

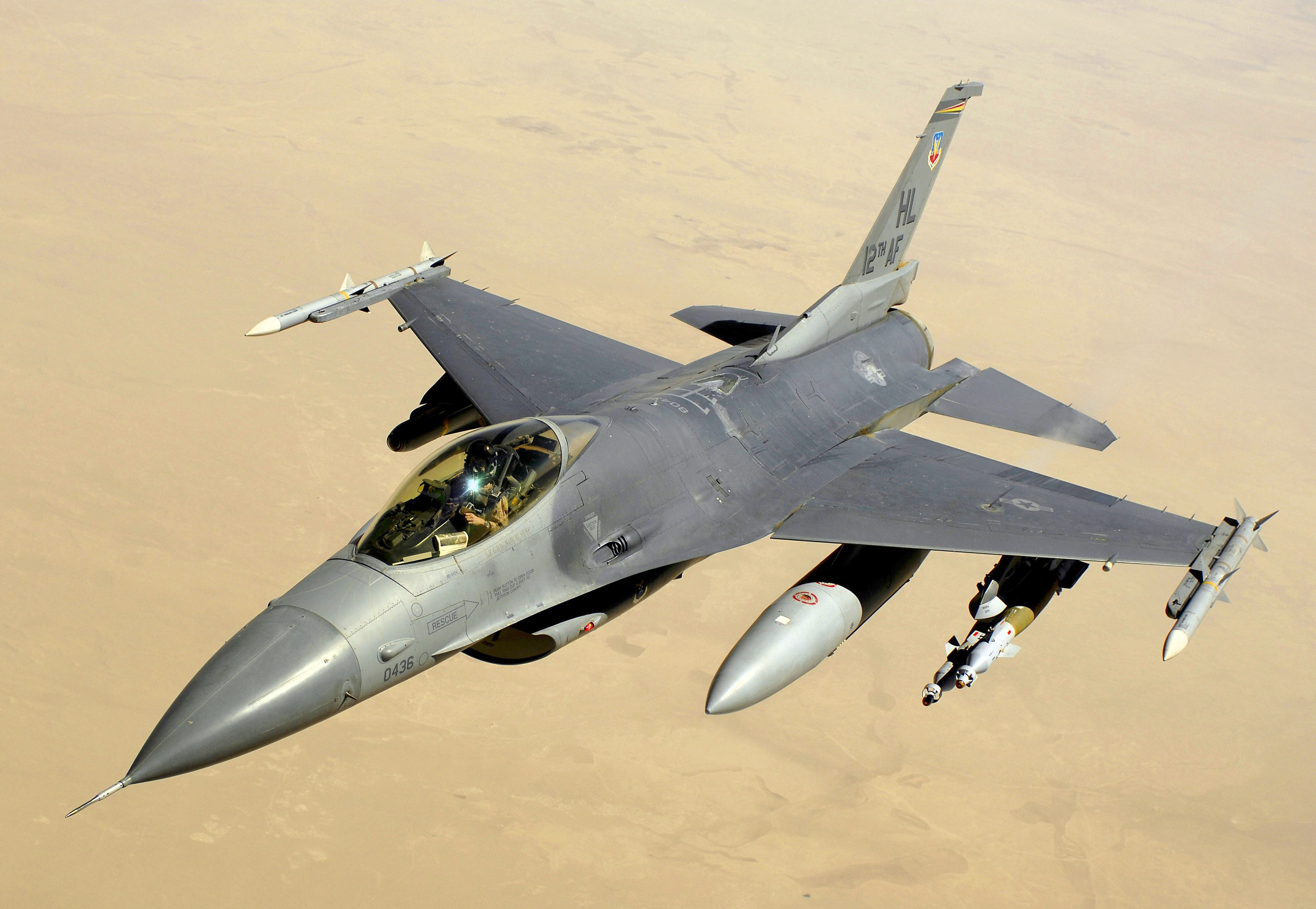
An F-16C over Iraq in 2008

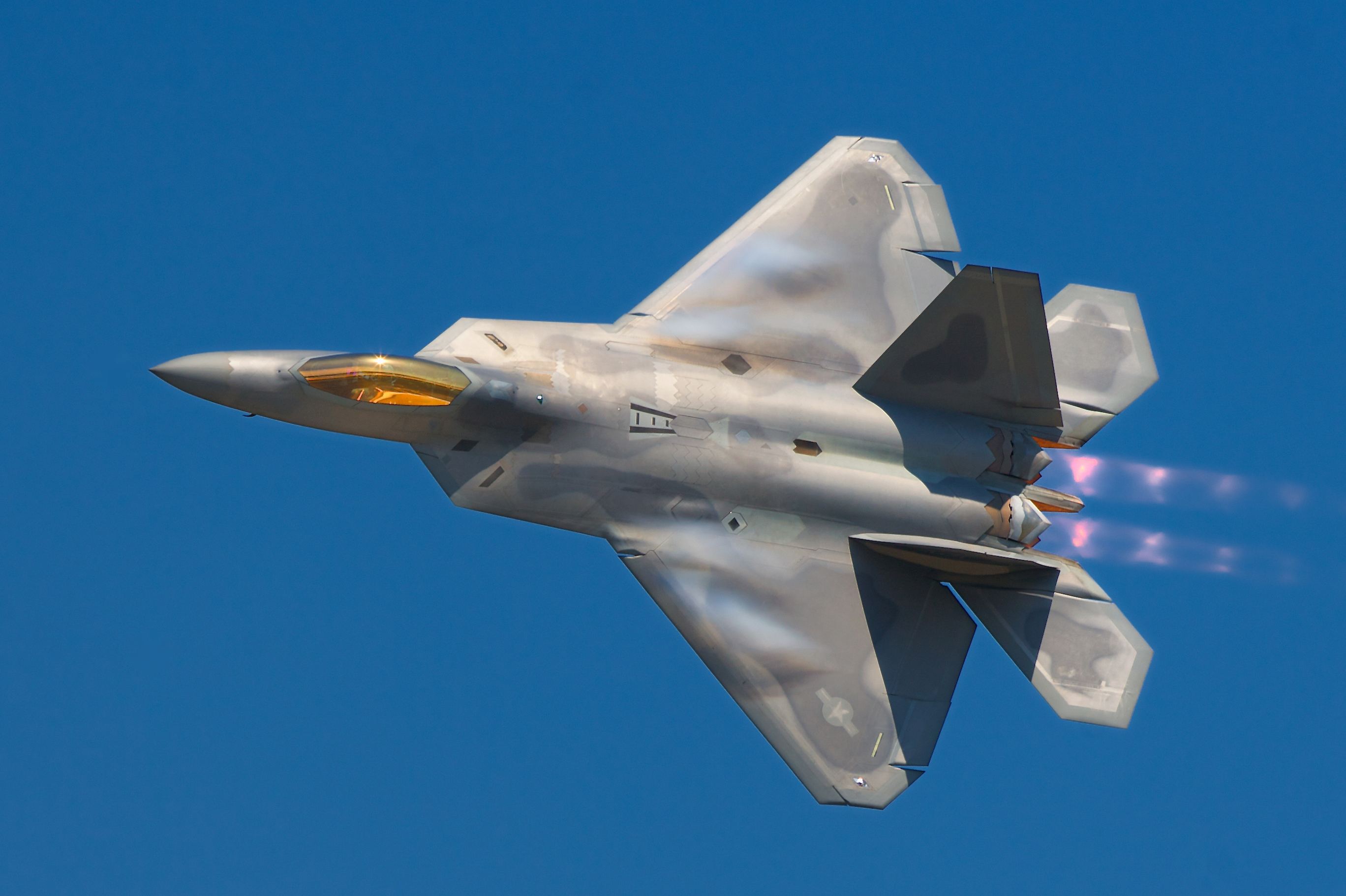
An F-22A Raptor flies over Andrews Air Force Base during an airshow in 2008

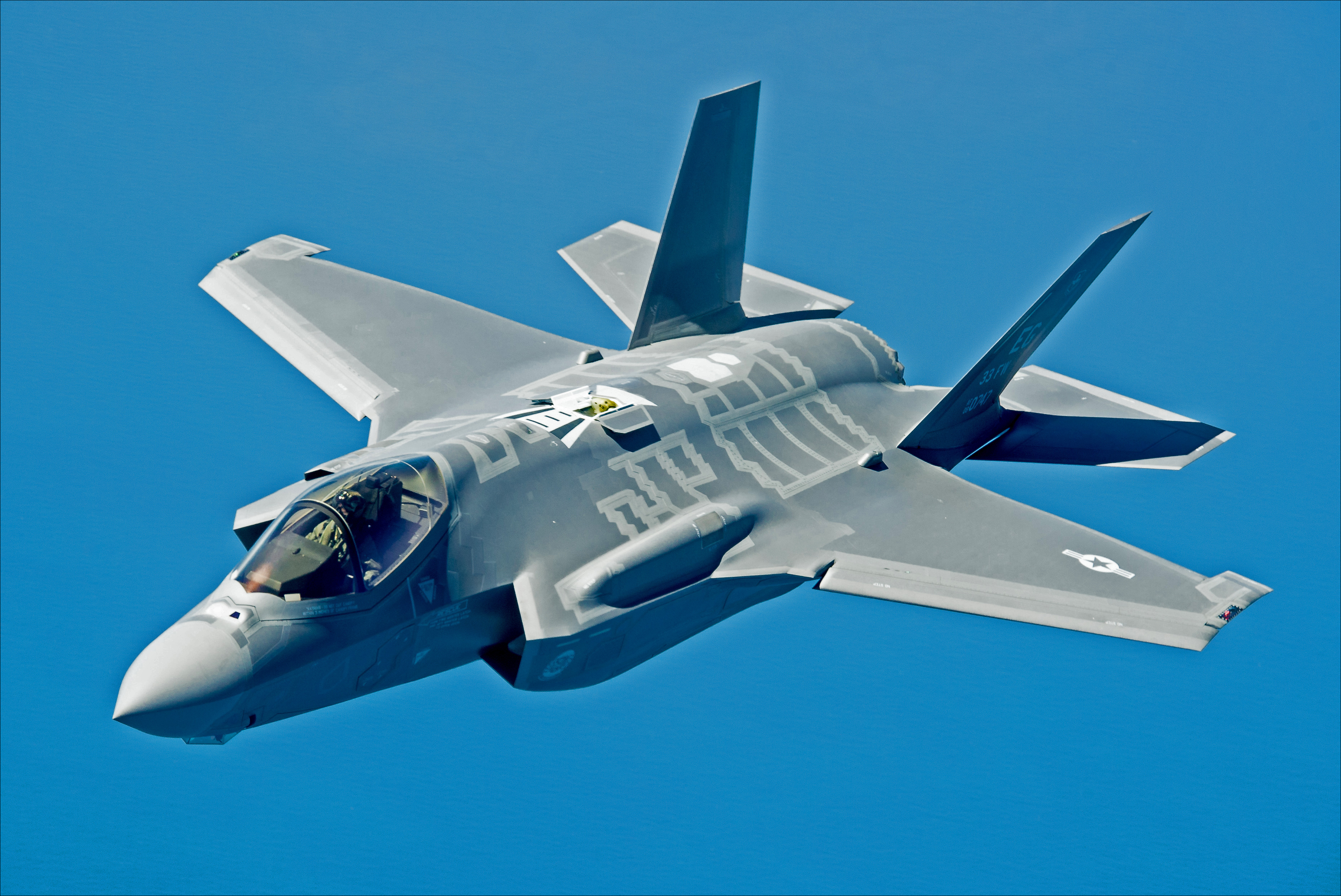
An F-35A in flight

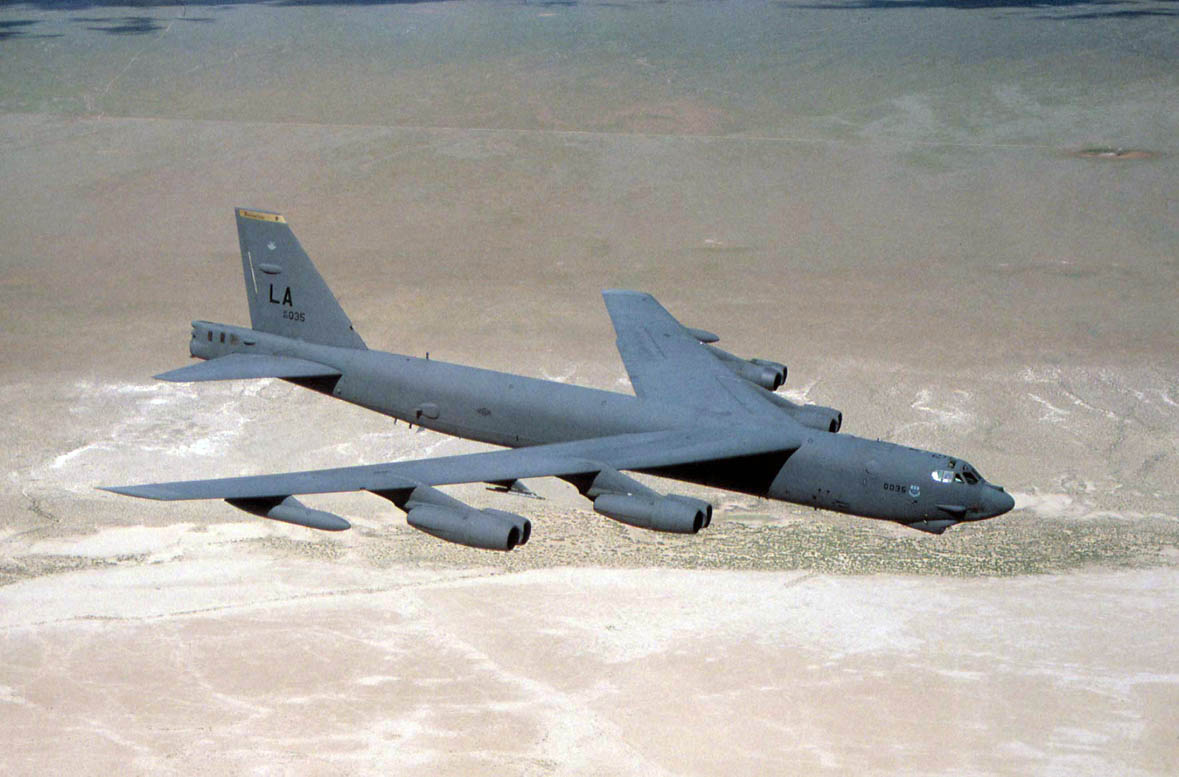
A USAF B-52 bomber

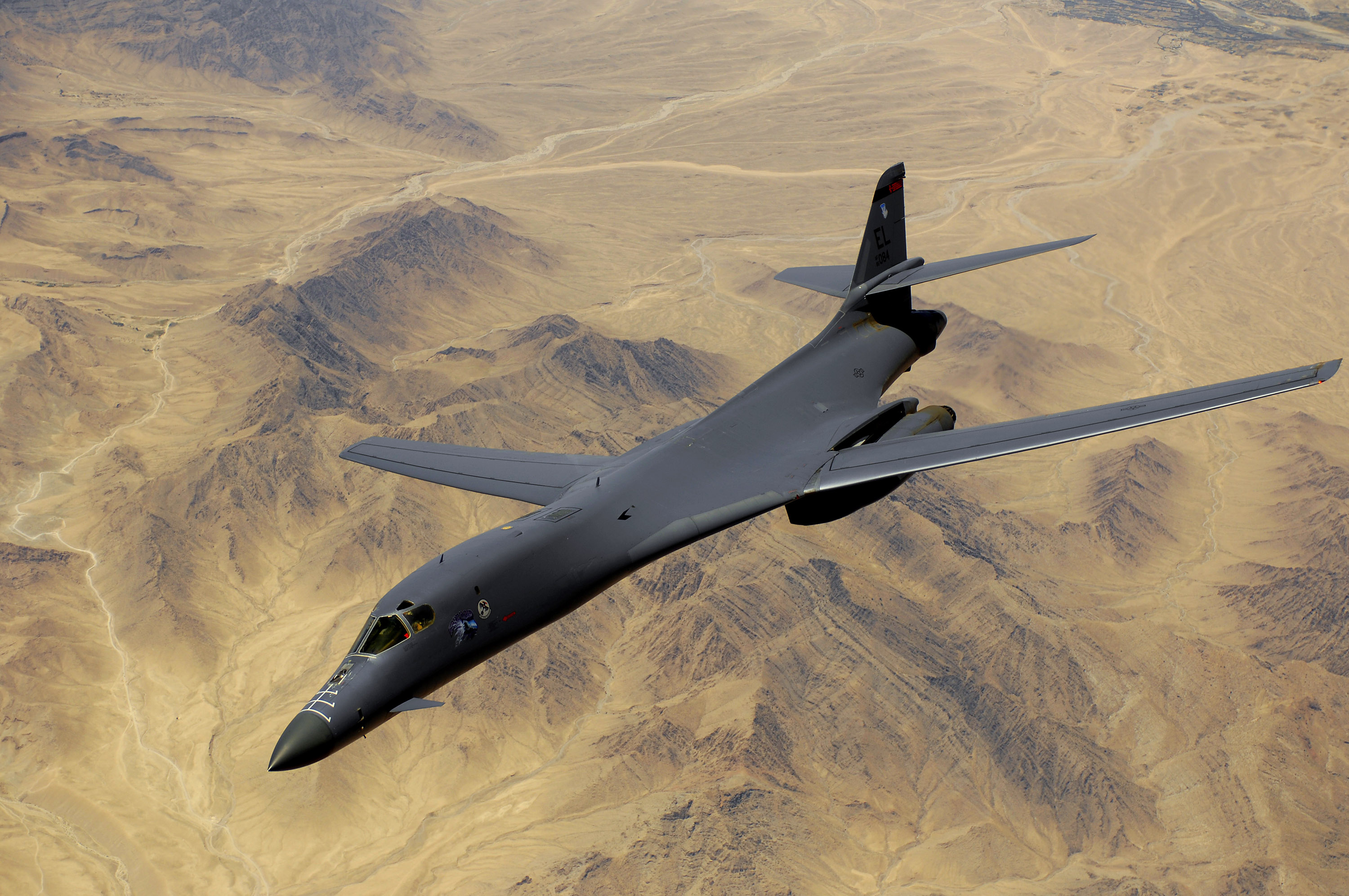
A B-1B in flight over Afghanistan

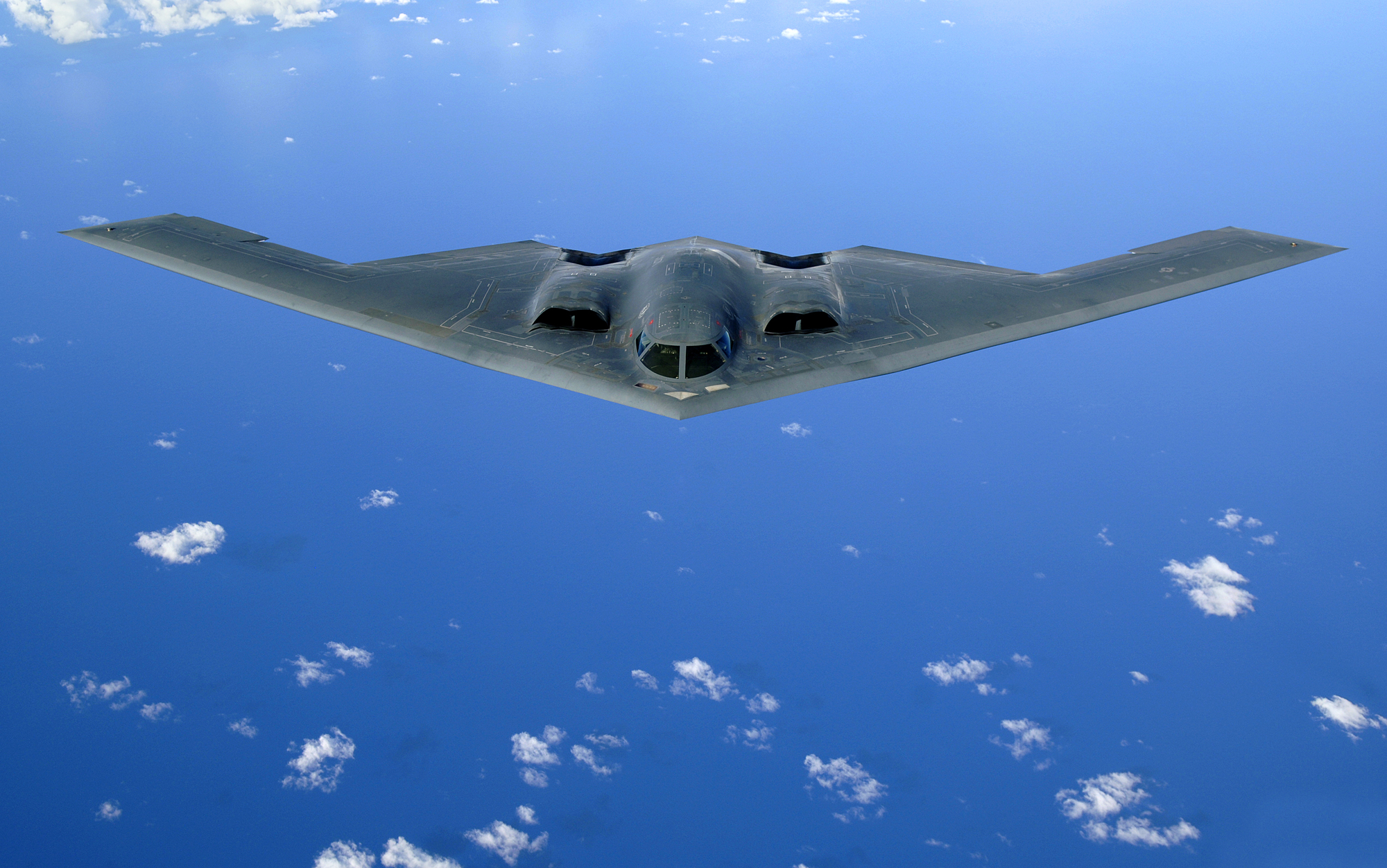
A B-2 Spirit stealth bomber flies over the Pacific Ocean

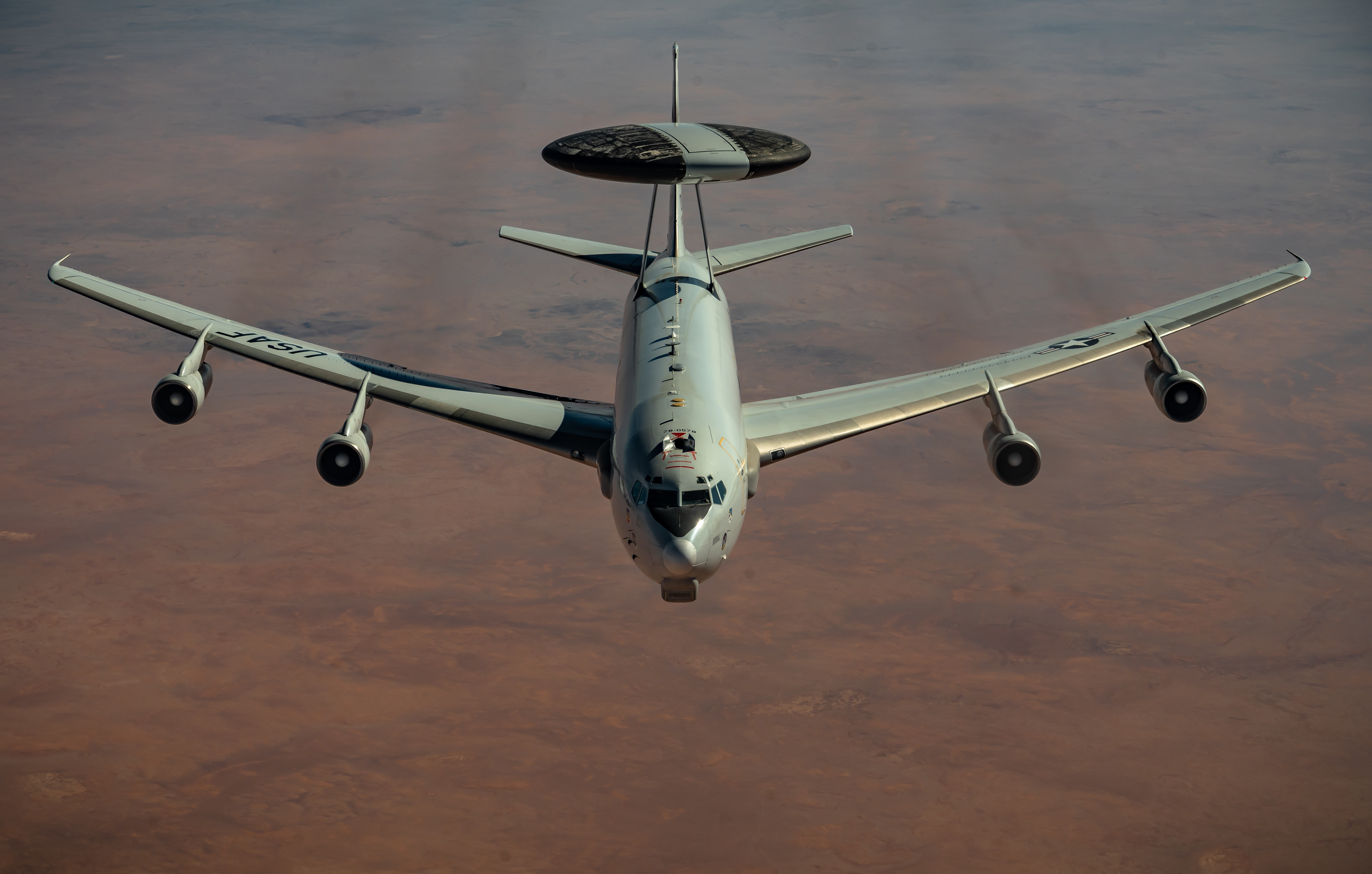
An E-3 Sentry AWACS aircraft

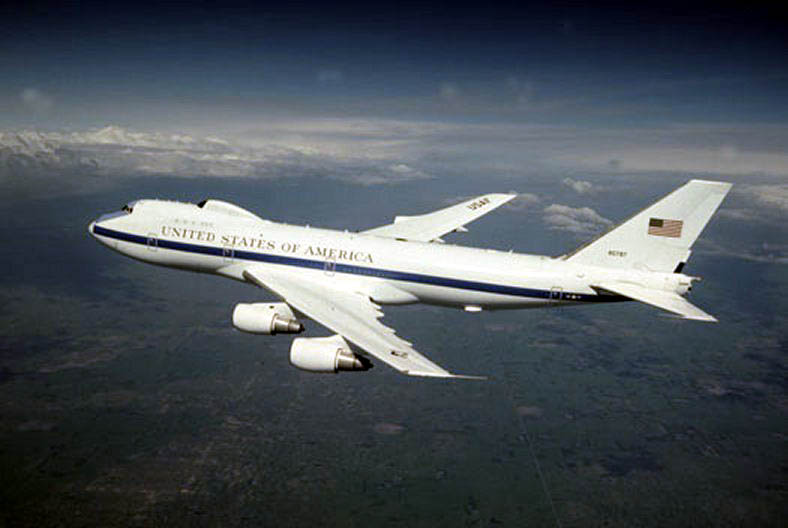
One of 4 E-4B Nightwatch airborne command posts

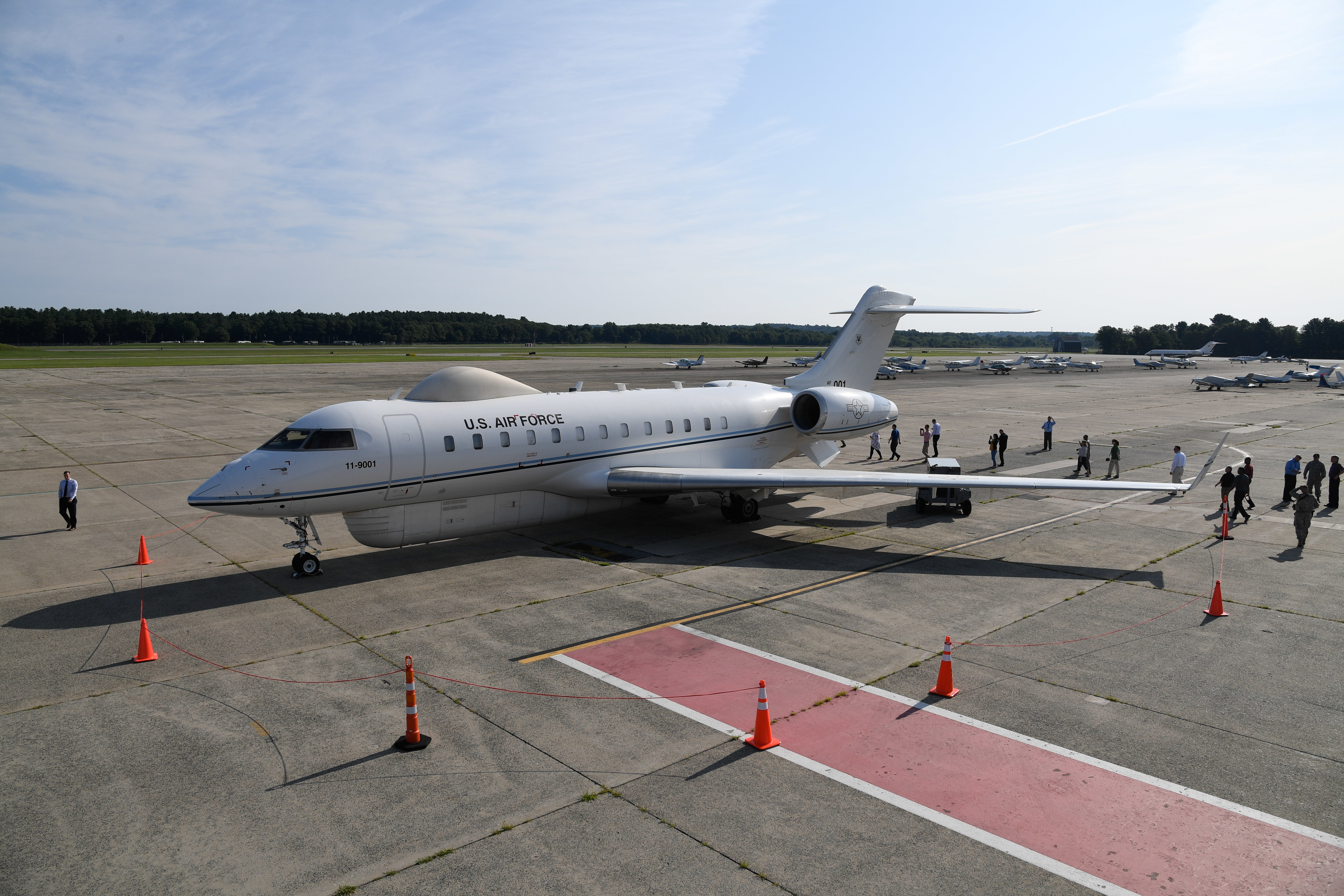
A new E-11 aircraft being rolled out in 2018

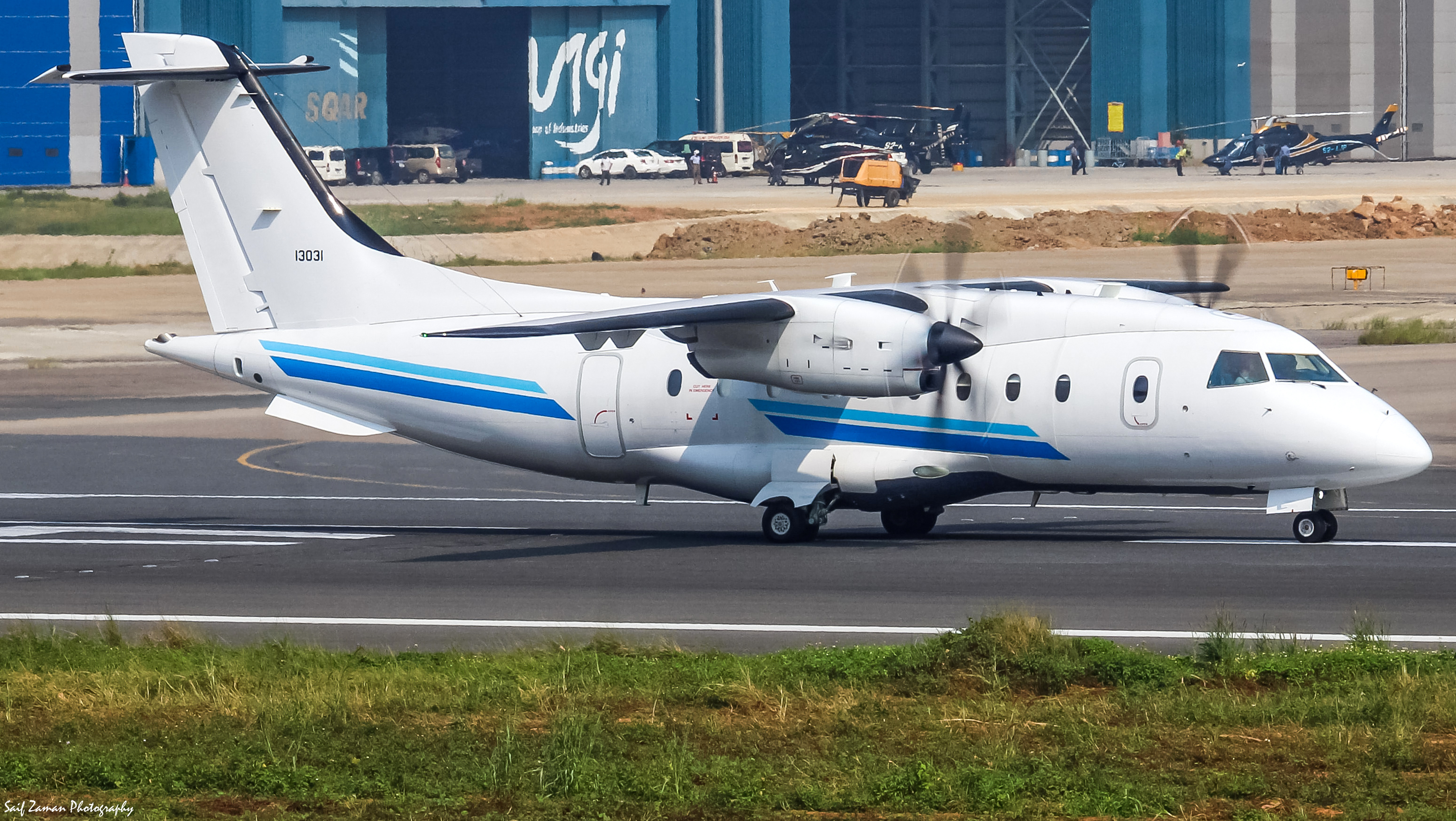
A C-146A Wolfhound taking off

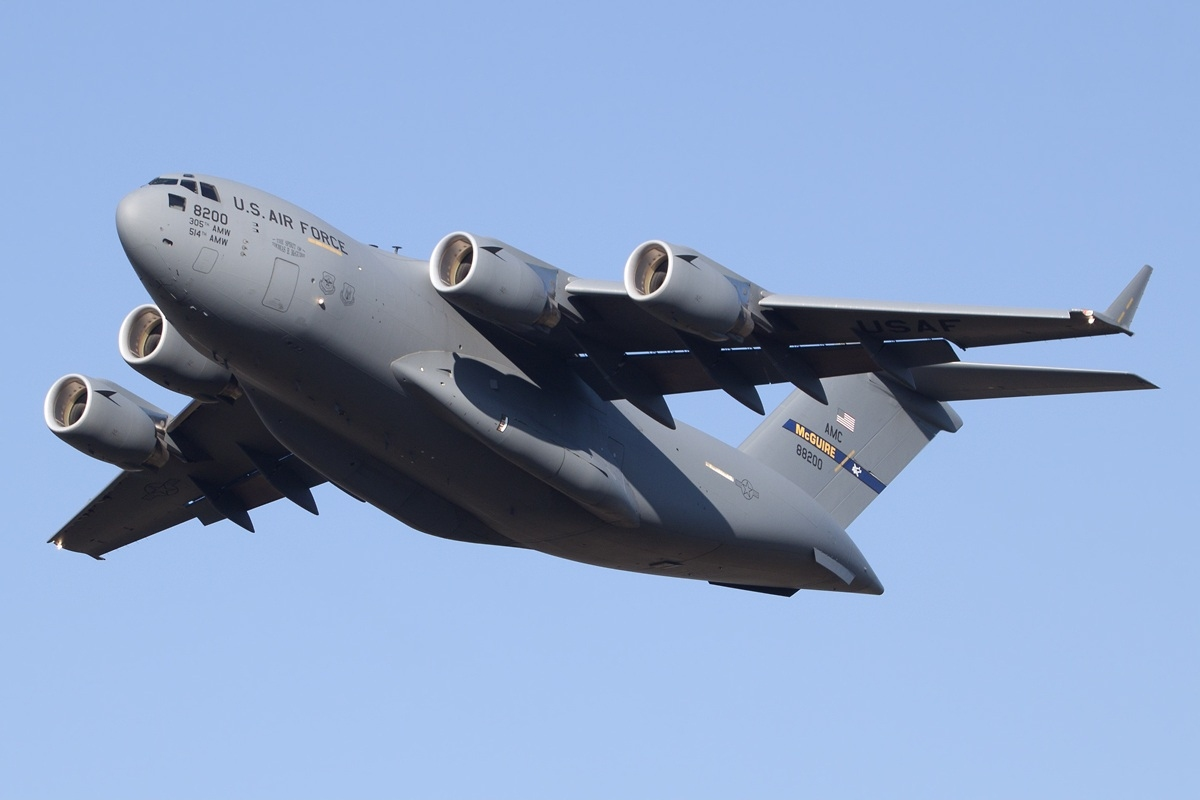
A C-17A Globemaster III taking off from Ramstein Air Base

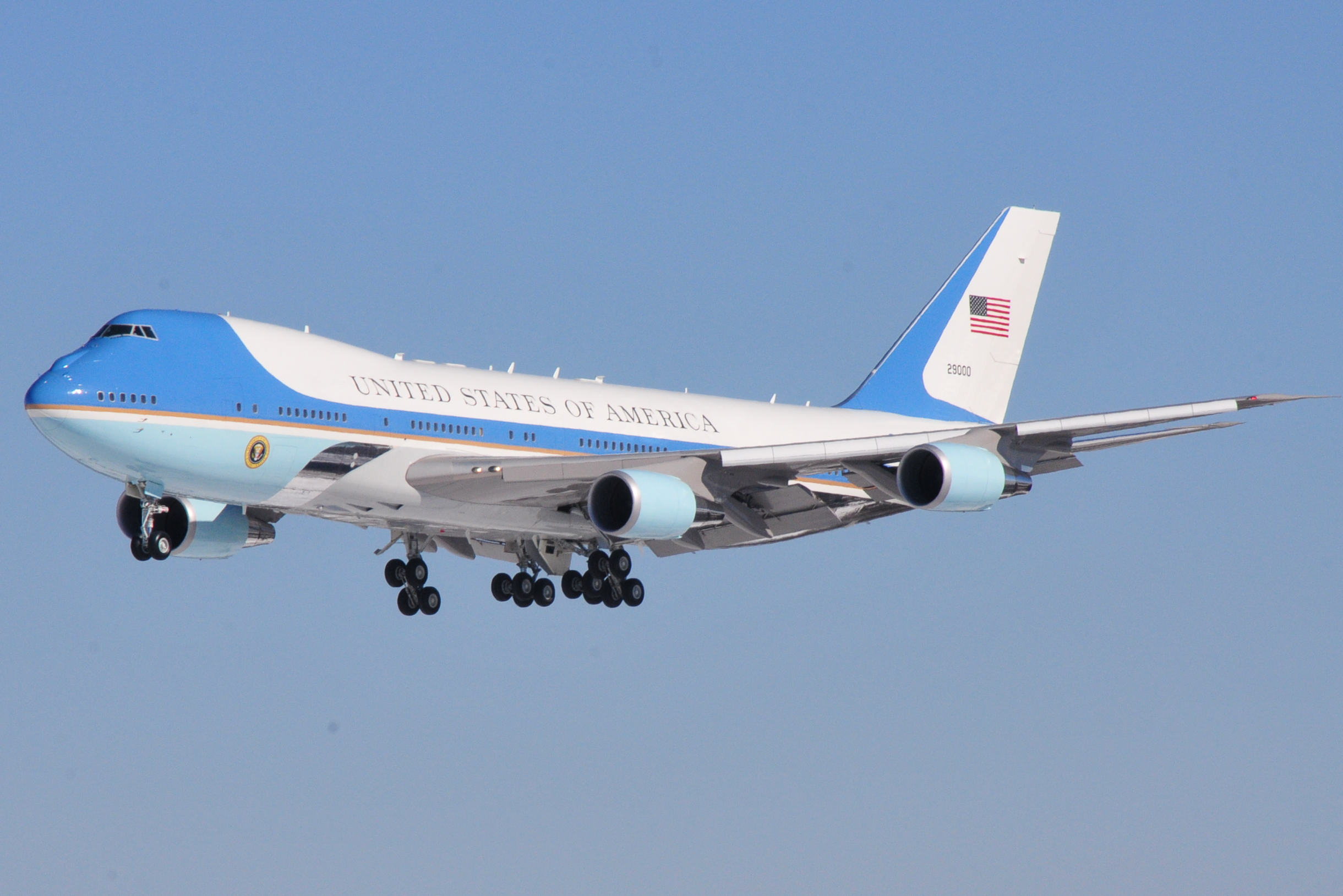
A VC-25 Air Force One with landing gear down

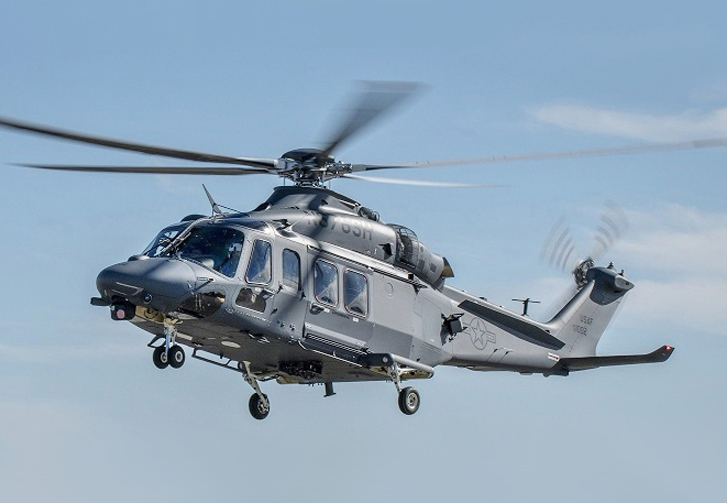
The MH-139A Grey Wolf replacement for the Bell UH-1N

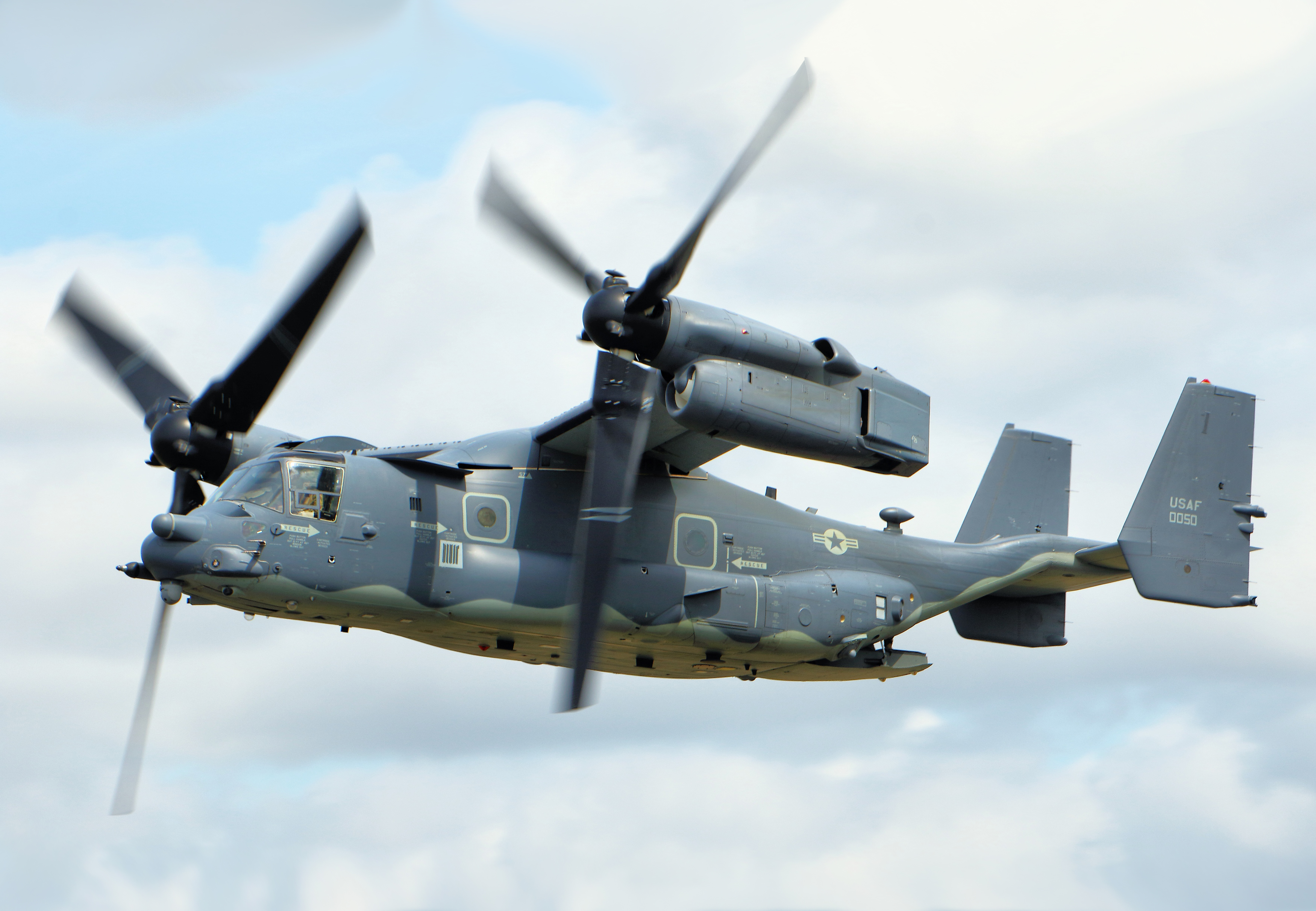
A CV-22 Osprey over RIAT in 2015

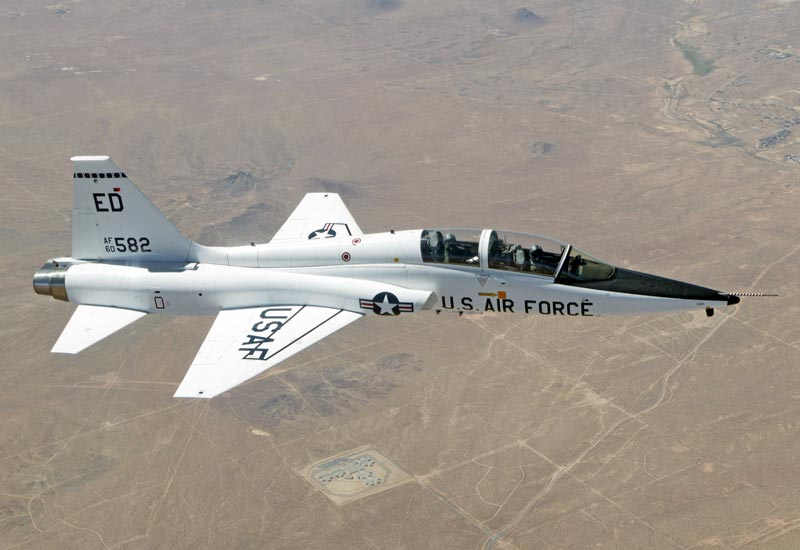
A T-38 Talon over Edwards AFB

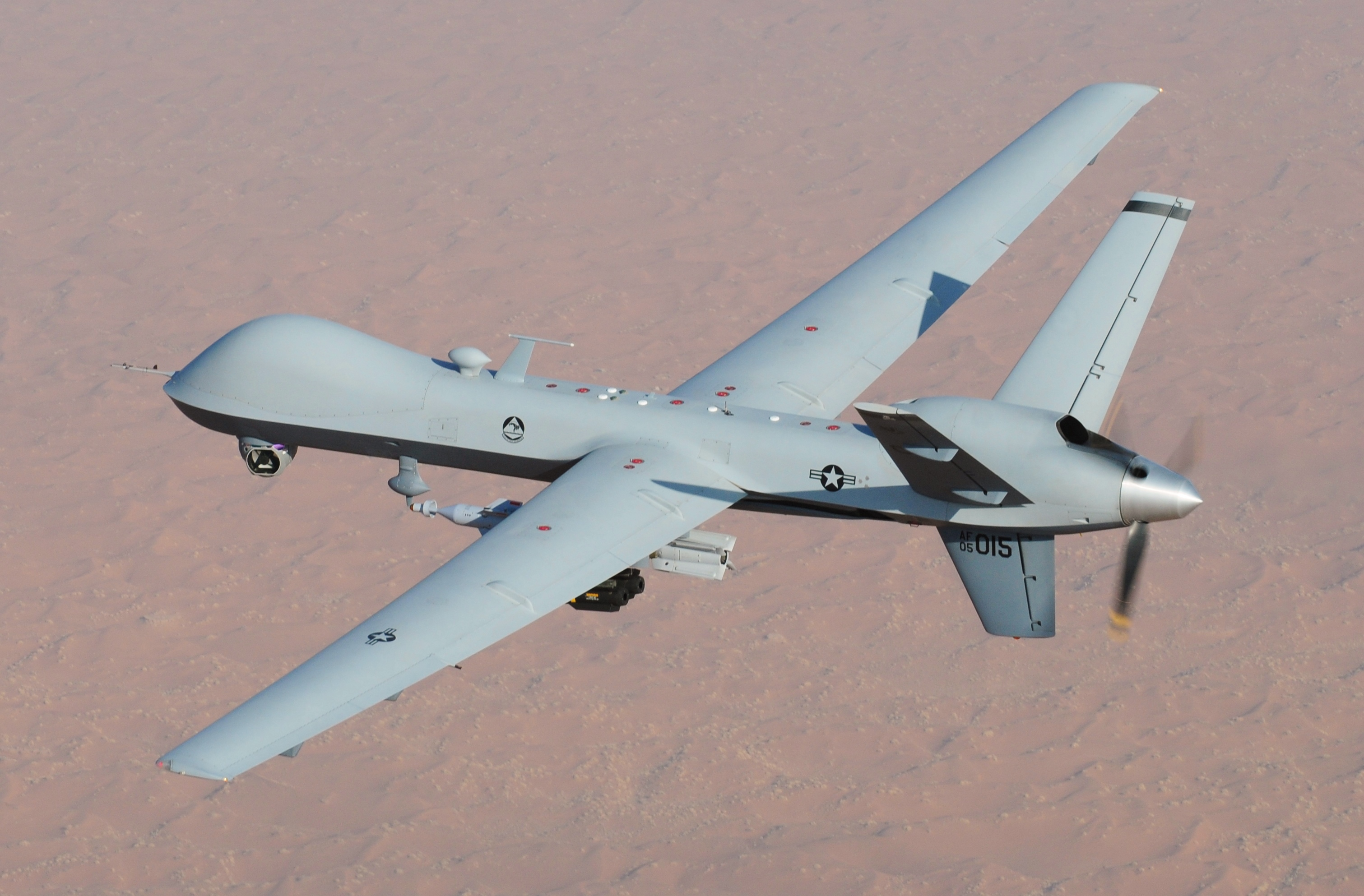
An MQ-9 Reaper flies over Southern Afghanistan, 2008

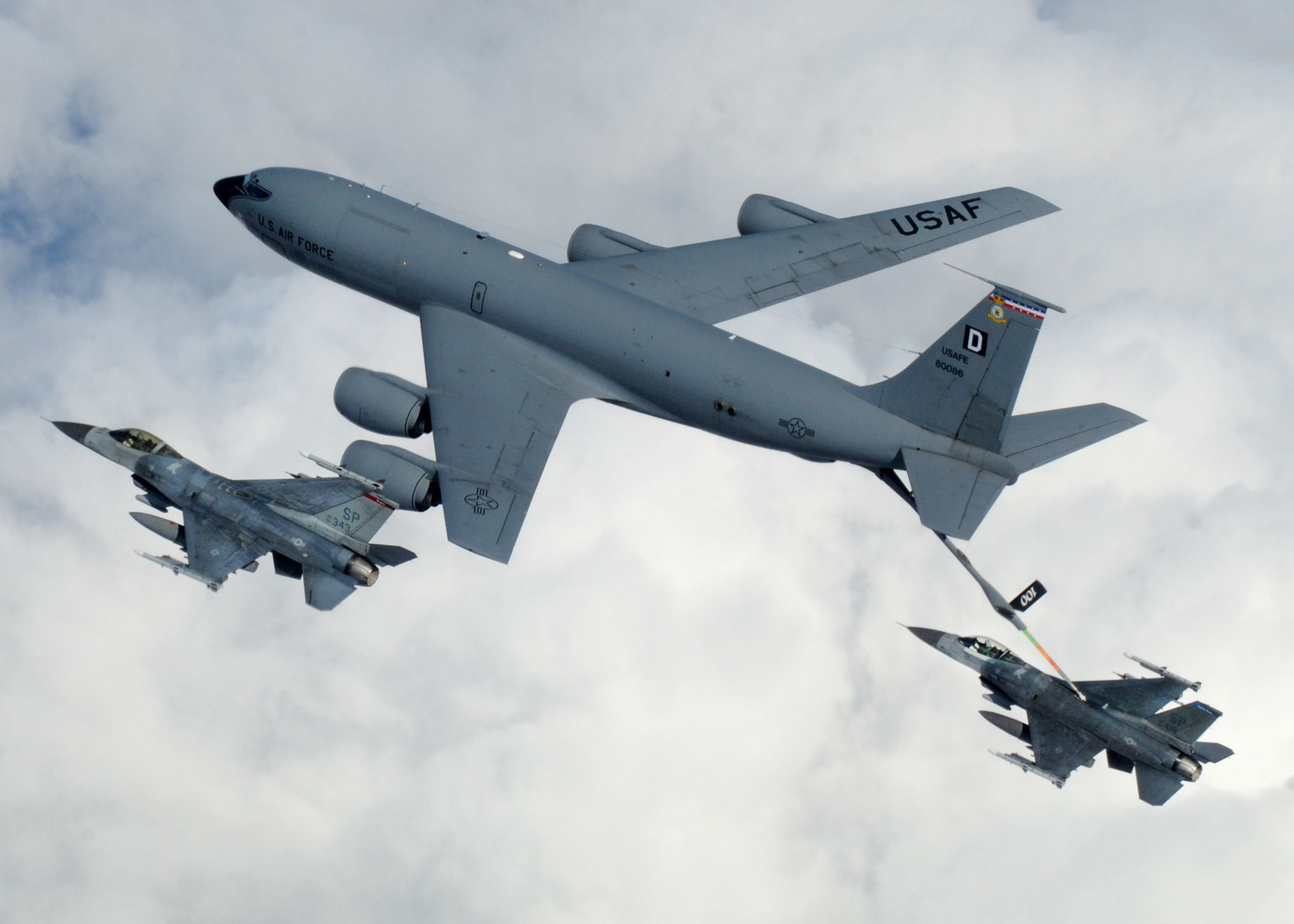
KC-135 Refueling F-16s

== See also ==
- Future military aircraft of the United States
- List of military aircraft of the United States
- List of U.S. DoD aircraft designations
- List of currently active United States naval aircraft
- List of United States Air Force squadrons
- List of active U.S. Air Force aircraft squadrons
- UAVs in the U.S. military

== Bibliography ==
- 2024 World Air Forces (Report). Flight Global. 2023.
