= North American XB-28 Dragon =

American bomber prototype

XB-28
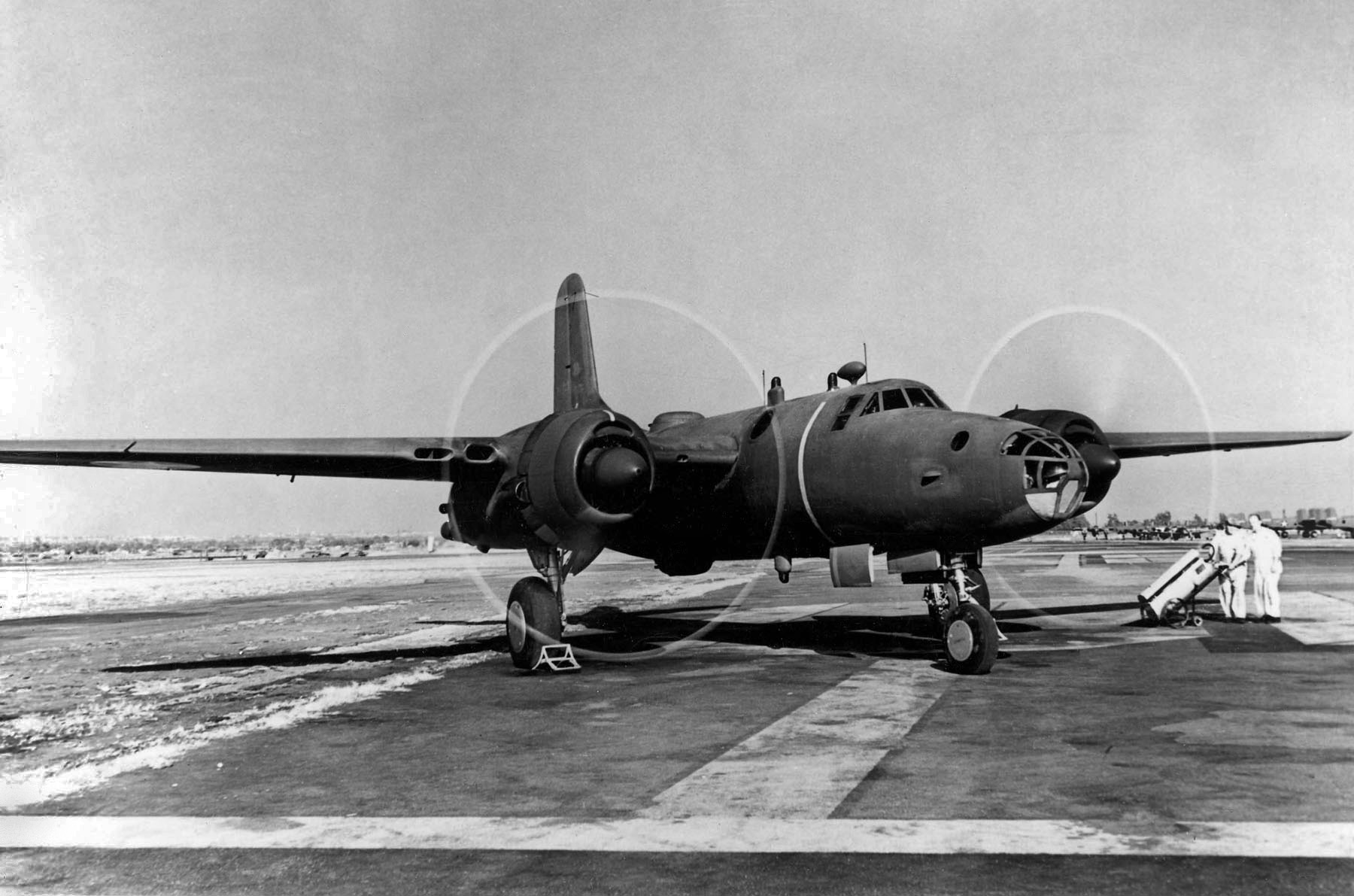
- North American XB-28 with engines running

General information
- Type: High-altitude medium bomber
- Manufacturer: North American Aviation
- Status: Prototype
- Primary user: United States Army Air Forces
- Number built: 2

History
- First flight: 26 April 1942
- Developed from: North American B-25 Mitchell

The North American XB-28 (NA-63) was an aircraft proposed by North American Aviation to fill a strong need in the United States Army Air Corps for a high-altitude medium bomber. It never entered production, with only two prototypes being built.

== Design and development ==
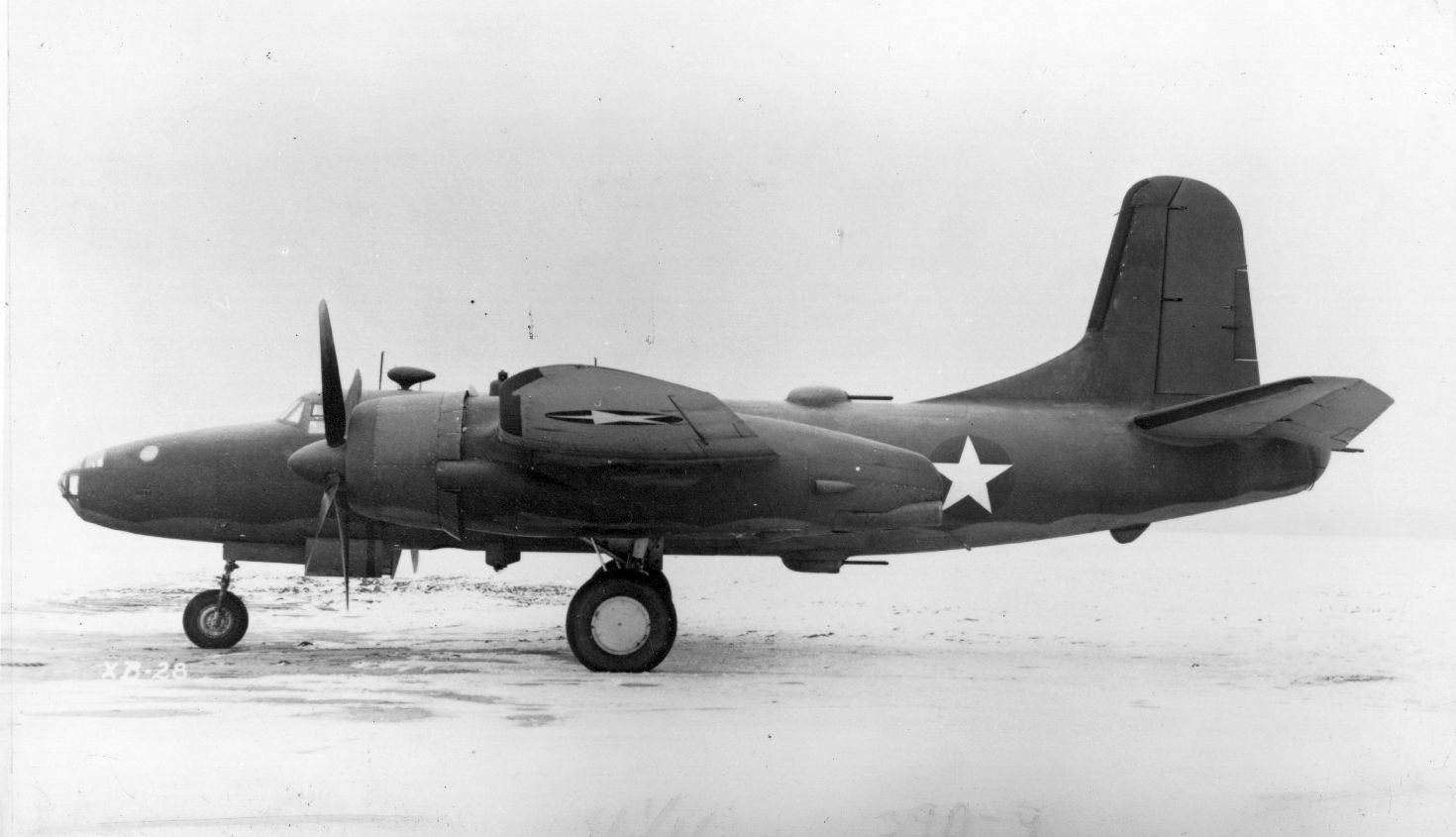
Side view of the North American XB-28.

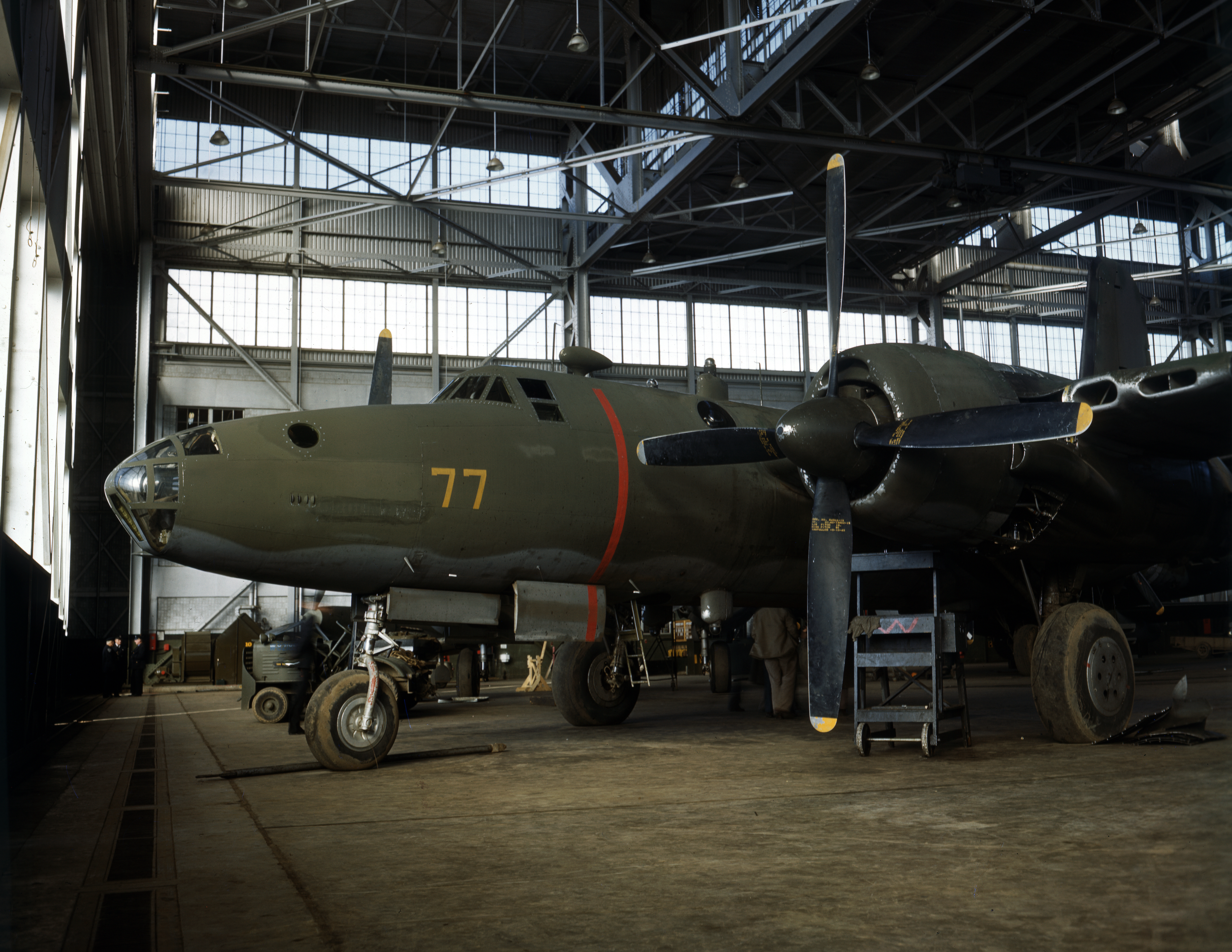
North American XB-28 in hangar.

The order for a high-altitude medium bomber was put out on 13 February 1940; the XB-28 first flew on 26 April 1942. The XB-28 was based on North American Aviation's highly successful B-25 Mitchell, but as it evolved it became a completely new design, much more reminiscent of the Martin B-26 Marauder. The overall configuration of the B-25 and XB-28 were fairly similar; the most important distinction was that the twin tail of the B-25 was changed to a single tail on the XB-28. It was among the first combat aircraft with a pressurized cabin.

The XB-28 proved an excellent design, with significantly better performance than that of the B-25, but it was never put into production. High-altitude bombing was hampered significantly by factors such as clouds and wind, which were frequent occurrences in the Pacific. At the same time, medium bombers were becoming much more effective at lower altitudes. The gains in aircraft performance that came with high-altitude flight were not considered sufficient to justify switching from low-altitude bombing.

In recent years, the name "Dragon" has been attributed to the XB-28. However, this name is not used in any contemporary accounts, or by the U.S. Air Force Museum site; it was almost unheard of, in that era, for an aircraft to receive an official nickname before a production order was placed, and the Douglas B-23 Dragon was already in service with the same name.

== Testing and evaluation ==
Even though the Army Air Forces rejected the XB-28 as a bomber, they ordered another prototype. Designated XB-28A, it was meant to explore the possibility of use as a reconnaissance aircraft. The XB-28A crashed into the Pacific Ocean off Southern California after the crew bailed out on 4 August 1943.

== Specifications (XB-28A) ==
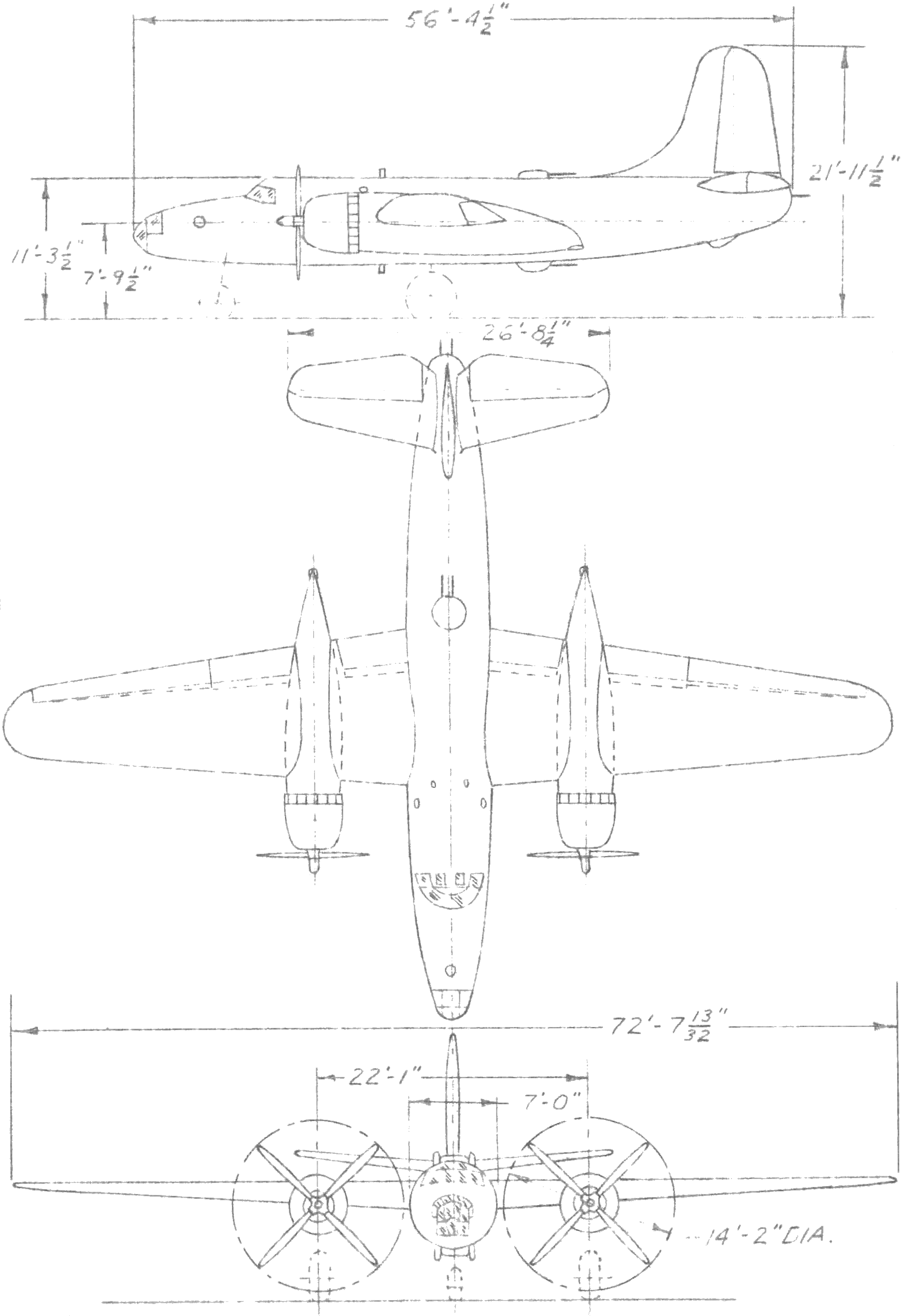
3-view line drawing of the North American XB-28 Dragon

Data from

General characteristics

- Crew: Five
- Length: 56 ft 4 in (17.17 m)
- Wingspan: 72 ft 6 in (22.10 m)
- Height: 22 ft 0 in (6.71 m)
- Wing area: 675.9 sq ft (62.79 m^{2})
- Empty weight: 25,575 lb (11,601 kg)
- Gross weight: 35,763 lb (16,222 kg)
- Max takeoff weight: 39,135 lb (17,751 kg)
- Powerplant: 2 × Pratt & Whitney R-2800-27 18 cyl. air-cooled radial turbosupercharged piston engines, 2,000 hp (1,500 kW) each

Performance

- Maximum speed: 372 mph (599 km/h, 323 kn) at 25,000 ft (7,600 m)
- Cruise speed: 255 mph (410 km/h, 222 kn)
- Range: 2,040 mi (3,280 km, 1,770 nmi)
- Service ceiling: 34,800 ft (10,600 m)
- Rate of climb: 1,111 ft/min (5.64 m/s)
- Wing loading: 52.87 lb/sq ft (258.1 kg/m^{2})
- Power/mass: 0.112 hp/lb (184 W/kg)

Armament

- Guns: 6 × .50 caliber (12.7mm) M2 machine guns in remote-sighted turrets
- Bombs: Normal 2,000 lb (910 kg), Maximum 4,000 lb (1,800 kg)

== See also ==
Related development

- North American B-25 Mitchell

Aircraft of comparable role, configuration, and era

- Douglas A-26 Invader
- Focke-Wulf Fw 191
- Junkers Ju 288
- Martin B-26 Marauder
- Martin XB-27
- Martin XB-33 Super Marauder

Related lists

- List of bomber aircraft
- List of military aircraft of the United States
