= Martin XB-27 =

American bomber project

XB-27
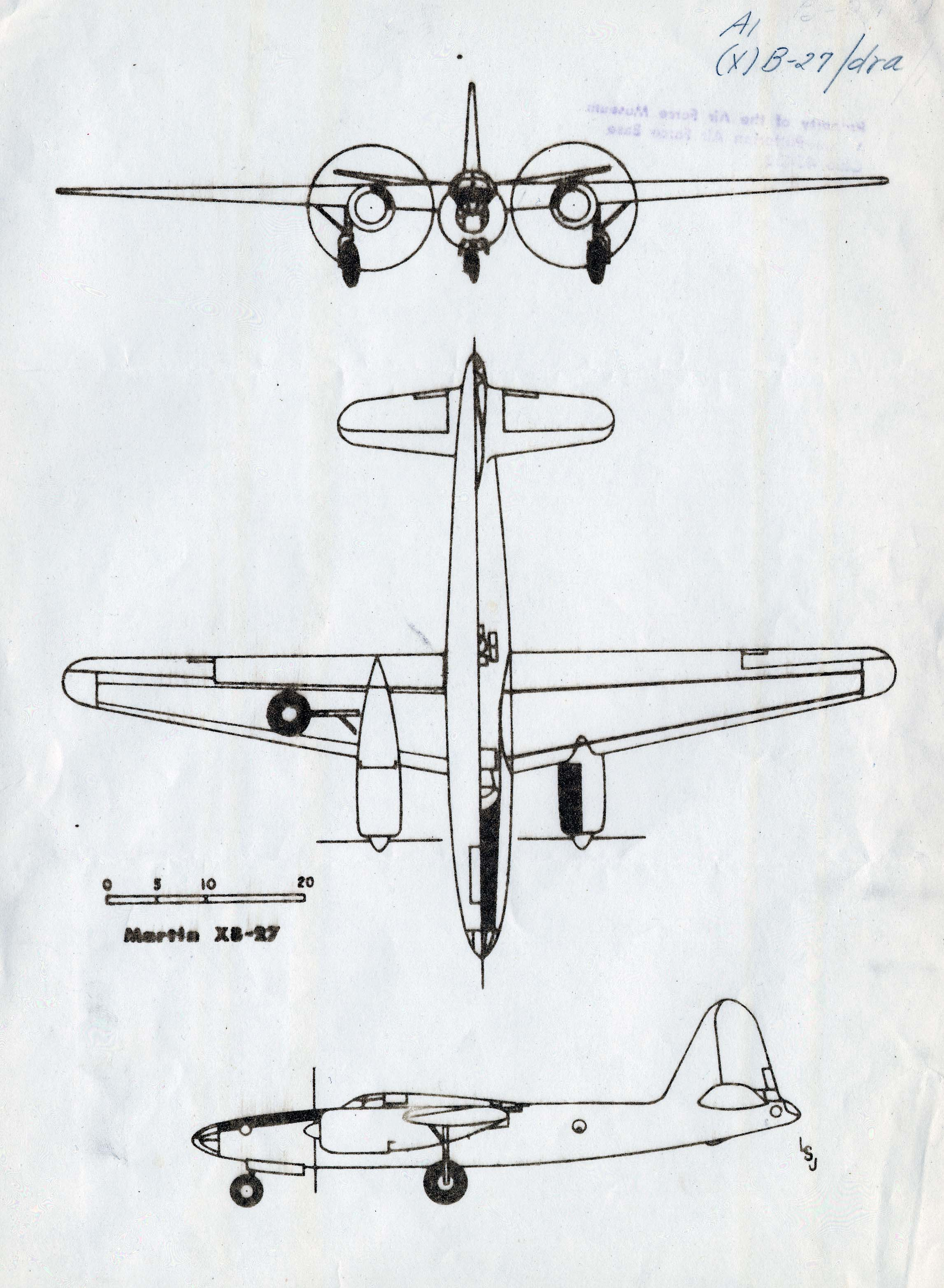

General information
- Type: High-altitude medium bomber
- National origin: United States
- Manufacturer: Glenn L. Martin Company

History
- Developed from: Martin B-26 Marauder

The Martin XB-27 (Martin Model 182) was an aircraft proposed by the Glenn L. Martin Company to fill a need in the United States Army Air Corps for a high-altitude medium bomber. Its design was based on that of Martin's B-26 Marauder. The XB-27 remained on paper, and no prototypes were built.

== Specifications (as designed) ==
Data from

General characteristics

- Crew: 7
- Length: 60 ft 9 in (18.52 m)
- Wingspan: 84 ft 0 in (25.60 m)
- Height: 20 ft 0 in (6.10 m)
- Powerplant: 2 × Pratt & Whitney R-2800-9 , 2,000 shp (1,500 kW) each
- Propellers: 4-bladed constant-speed propellers

Performance

- Maximum speed: 280 mph (450 km/h, 240 kn)
- Range: 2,900 mi (4,700 km, 2,500 nmi)
- Service ceiling: 33,500 ft (10,200 m)
- Power/mass: 0.12 hp/lb (0.20 kW/kg)

Armament

- Guns:
  - 3 × .30 in (7.6 mm) machine guns
  - 1 × .30 in (7.6 mm) machine gun
- Bombs: >4,000 lb (1,800 kg)

== See also ==
Related development

- Martin B-26 Marauder
- Martin XB-33 Super Marauder

Aircraft of comparable role, configuration, and era

- North American XB-28 Dragon

Related lists

- List of military aircraft of the United States
- List of bomber aircraft
