= Lists of military aircraft of the United States =

Lists of military aircraft of the United States cover current and former military aircraft of the United States Armed Forces.

== By designation ==
- List of United States Air Force aircraft designations (1919–1962)
- List of United States Navy aircraft designations (pre-1962)
- List of United States Army aircraft designations (1956–1962)
- List of United States Tri-Service aircraft designations
- List of U.S. DoD aircraft designations
- List of undesignated military aircraft of the United States

== Other lists ==
- List of United States bomber aircraft
- List of United States military helicopters
- List of United States fighter aircraft
- List of United States attack aircraft
- List of active United States Air Force aircraft
- List of active United States military aircraft
- List of active United States naval aircraft
- List of aircraft of the United States during World War II
- List of future military aircraft of the United States
- UAVs in the U.S. military
- List of U.S. military equipment named for Native Americana
